= Navizence =

River in Valais, Switzerland

Navizence Navisence, Navizance
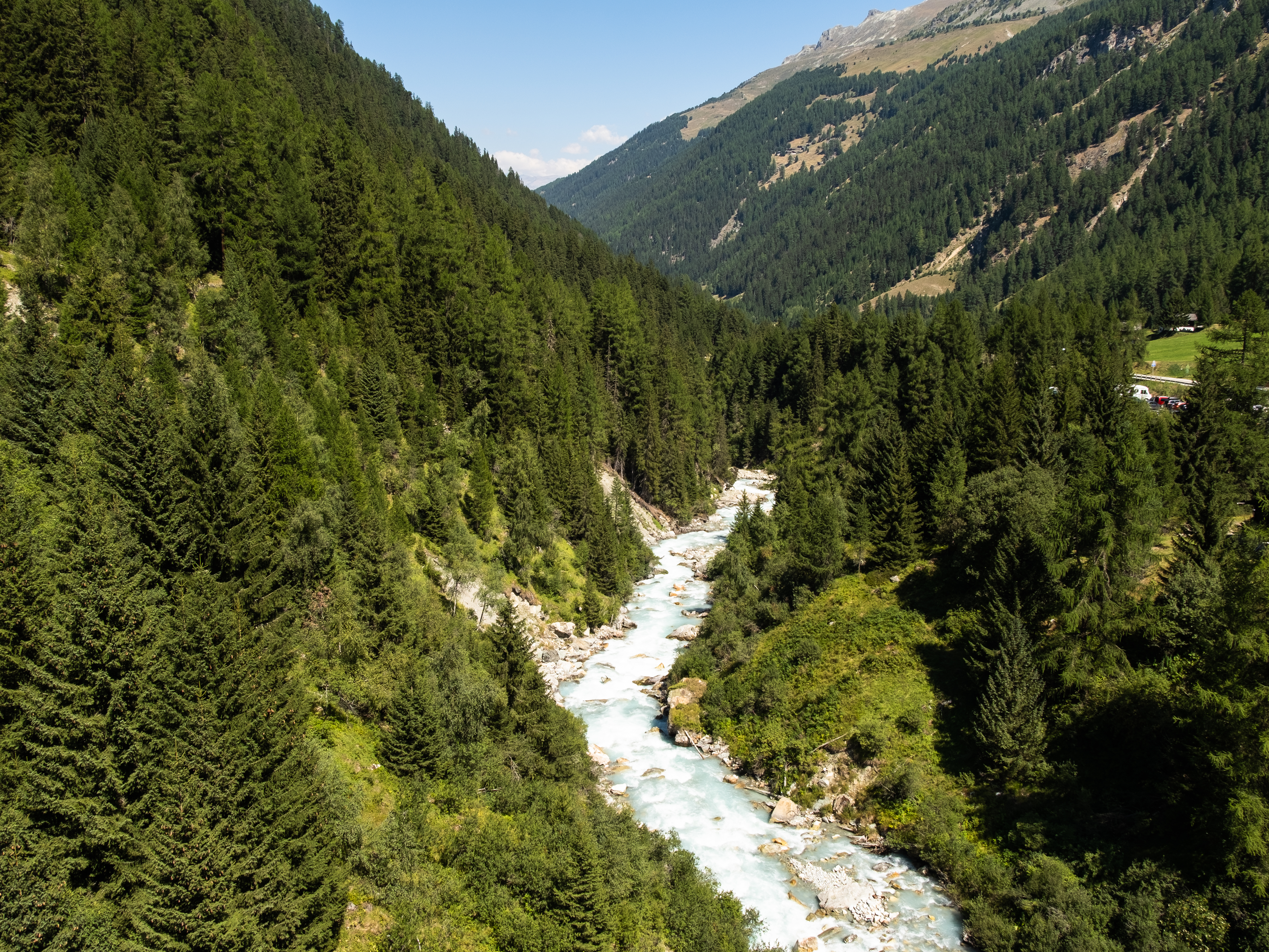
- Navizence in Zinal.

Location
- Country: Switzerland
- Region: Valais

Physical characteristics
- Source: Zinal Glacier
  - location: Anniviers
  - coordinates: 46°04′53″N 7°38′02″E
  - elevation: 2,100 m
- Source confluence: Rhône
  - location: Chippis
  - coordinates: 46°16′57″N 7°32′30″E
  - elevation: 522 m
- Length: 23 km (14 mi)
- Basin size: 255,5 km^{2}

Basin features
- Landmarks: Rhône
- Tributaries
  - left: Gougra
  - right: Torrent des Moulins

The Navizence is a 23-kilometer-long Swiss river located in the Anniviers Valley, in the canton of Valais. It is a left-bank tributary of the Rhône River, joining it at Chippis.

The river originates from the Zinal Glacier and flows northward and then north-northwest. It passes through several streams, particularly from Vissoie, where its bed lies at the bottom of a crevasse. Its main tributary is the Gougra.

The water from the Navizence is utilized by multiple hydroelectric plants and can be pumped to the Moiry Dam via a system of galleries. The Navizence has encountered major floods in 1834 and 2018, resulting in extensive destruction in the Anniviers Valley and Chippis. The river is home to various benthic macroinvertebrates and brown trout.

== Hydronymy ==
In 1267, the river was referred to as aquam de la Navisenchy. Its name could have originated from an early "Anniviers" form, with the suffix -entia, forming Anavisentia. Another possibility is that the name derives from the Gaulish "nava," which means "deep valley, ravine" in Latin, with the suffix -ence. Philologist Paul Aebischer suggests a Gaulish root anavo-, conveying ideas of inspiration and wealth.

The river has multiple spellings: "Navizance", "Navizence", "Navisance", or "Navisence". Its German name is Uzenz. In the local Arpitan dialect, it is referred to as Navijèïngtse.

== Geography ==
=== Location ===
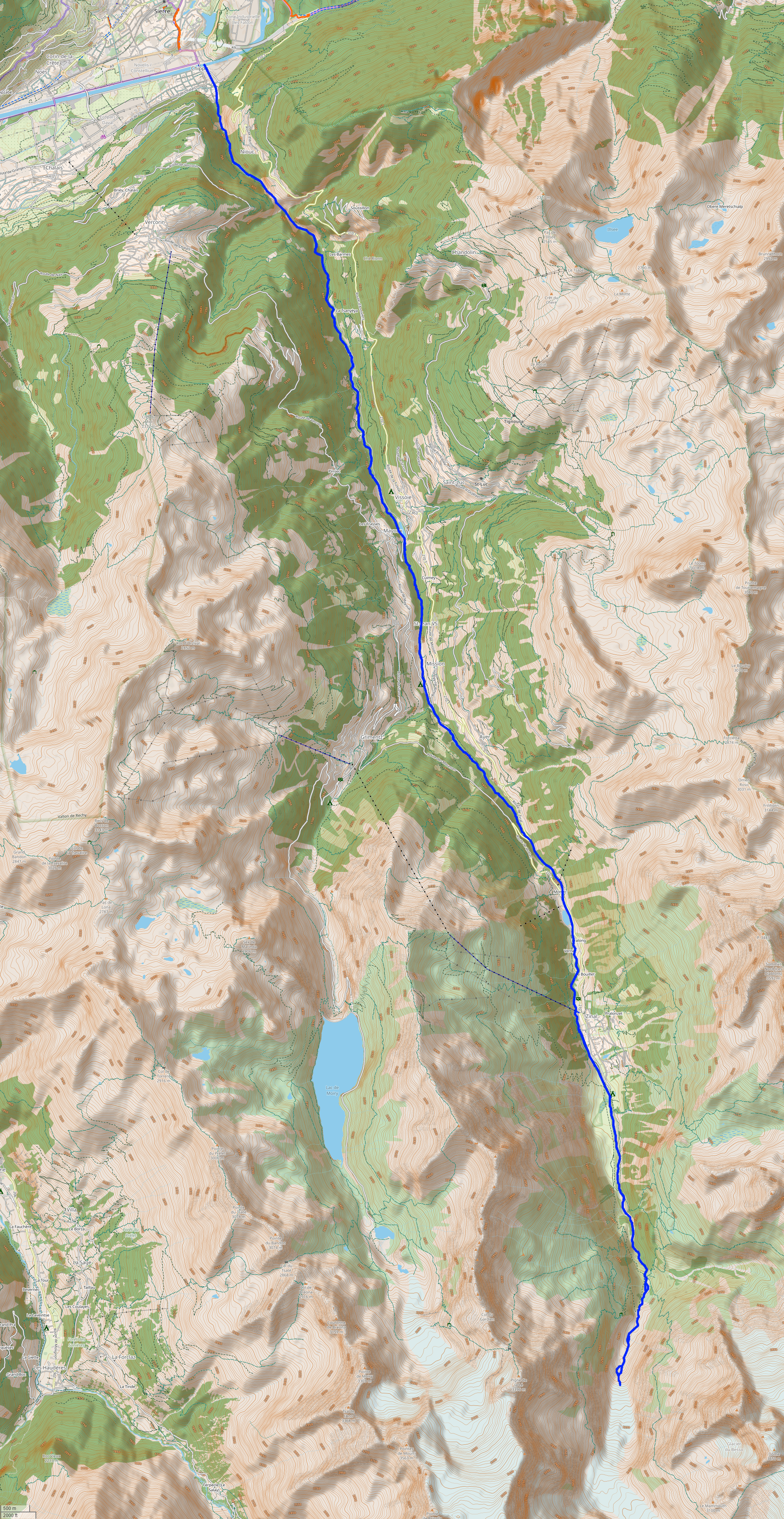
Navizence route map.

The Navizence flows through three municipalities in the canton of Valais: Anniviers, Chalais, and Chippis. The drainage basins of the Rèche surround it to the northwest, the Borgne to the west, the Viège from Zermatt to the south and southeast, the Turtmänna to the east, the Illgraben to the northeast, and the Rhône to the north.

=== Courses ===
The Navizence originates at 2,100 meters, at the exit of the Zinal Glacier, at the bottom of the western branch of the Anniviers Valley. At this point, the river also collects water from other glaciers, such as the Moming Glacier and the Lée Glacier. It then flows through a narrow gorge about 600 meters long. At its exit, it passes through the Plat de la Lée where several small streams join it from the Roc de la Vache, the Tracuit Glacier, Les Diablons, or the Garde de Bordon. The Navizence then flows through the village of Zinal.

About 2 km after Zinal, in Mottec, the watercourse descends sharply into a new stream with a direct and consistent slope. At this point, the river changes its direction from northward to north-northwest. Along its right bank, it is fed by water from the small Diablons Glacier, and further downstream in Ayer, it receives water from the Forcletta Pass. At an elevation of 1,287 meters above sea level, the river merges with its main tributary, the Gougra, which carries water from the Moiry Glacier and the Zozanne, Lona, and Marais lakes.

Considerably swollen by the Gougra, the Navizence flows northward and then turns north-northwest after Saint-Jean. It merges with the Moulins stream at Vissoie, which originates from the snowfields of Pointe de Nava, Toûno, and Bella Tola. As the valley narrows from Vissoie, the Navizence disappears into a canyon, receiving water from two tributaries: one from the Orzival Valley under Pinsec and the other from Schwarzhorn at Fang.

At the site known as "des Balmes," the rocky spur of Pontis, located at the base of Illhorn, alters the river course once more, this time flowing northwestward. The Navizence, reaching an elevation of 535 meters east of Chippis, spans a distance of 23 km before merging with the Rhône.

The Navizence course

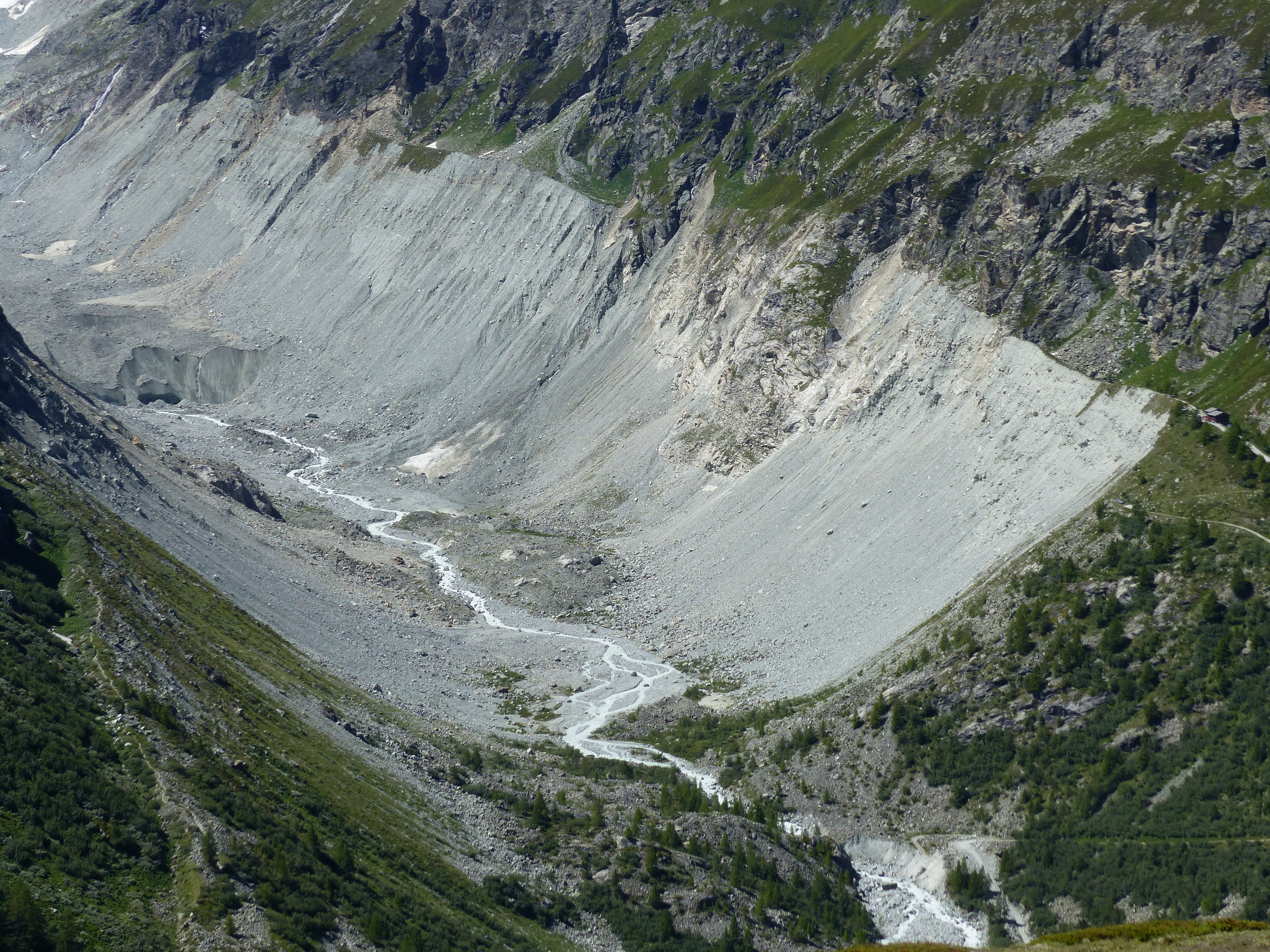
Exit from the Zinal Glacier.

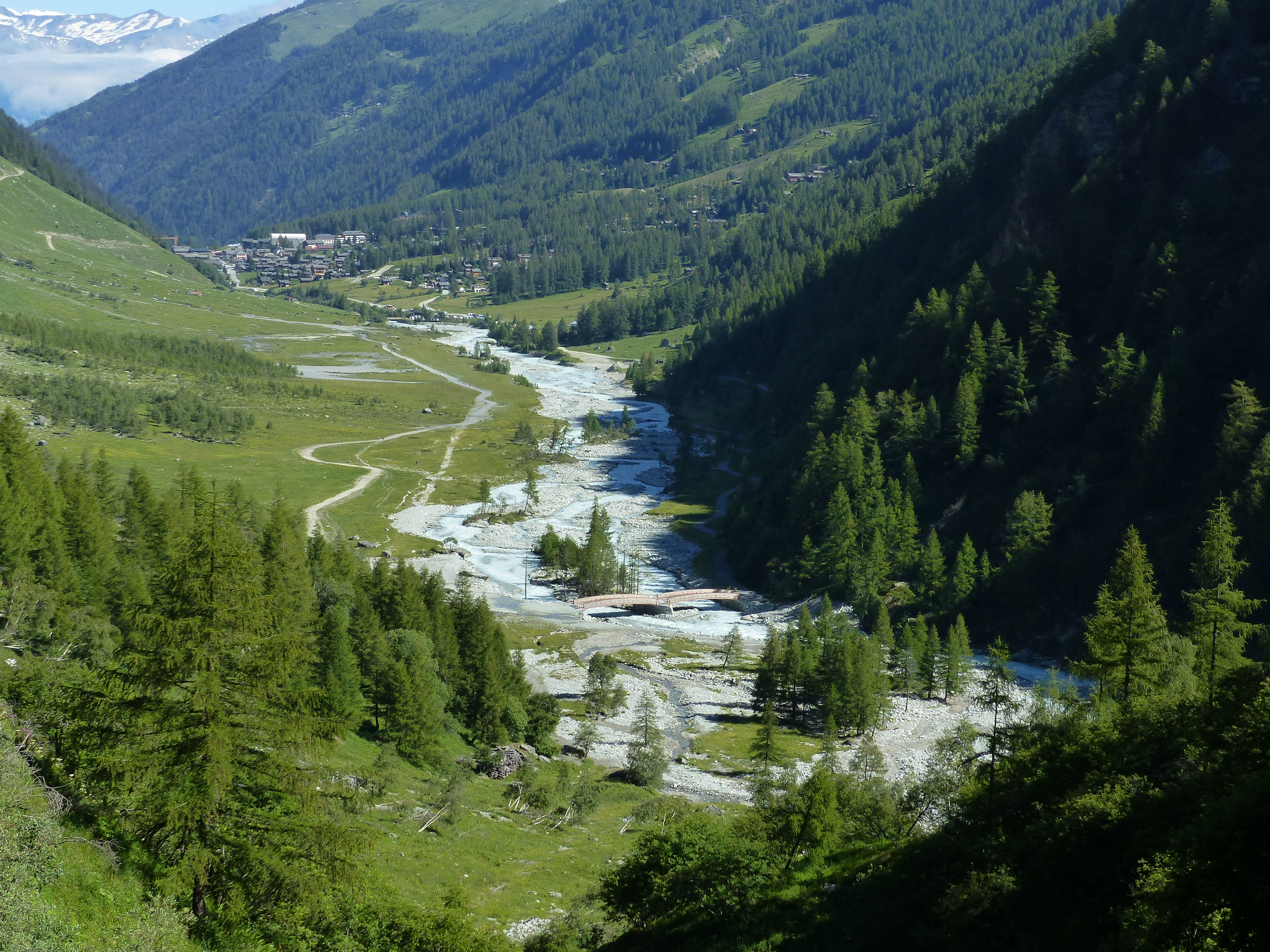
The Plat de la Lée.

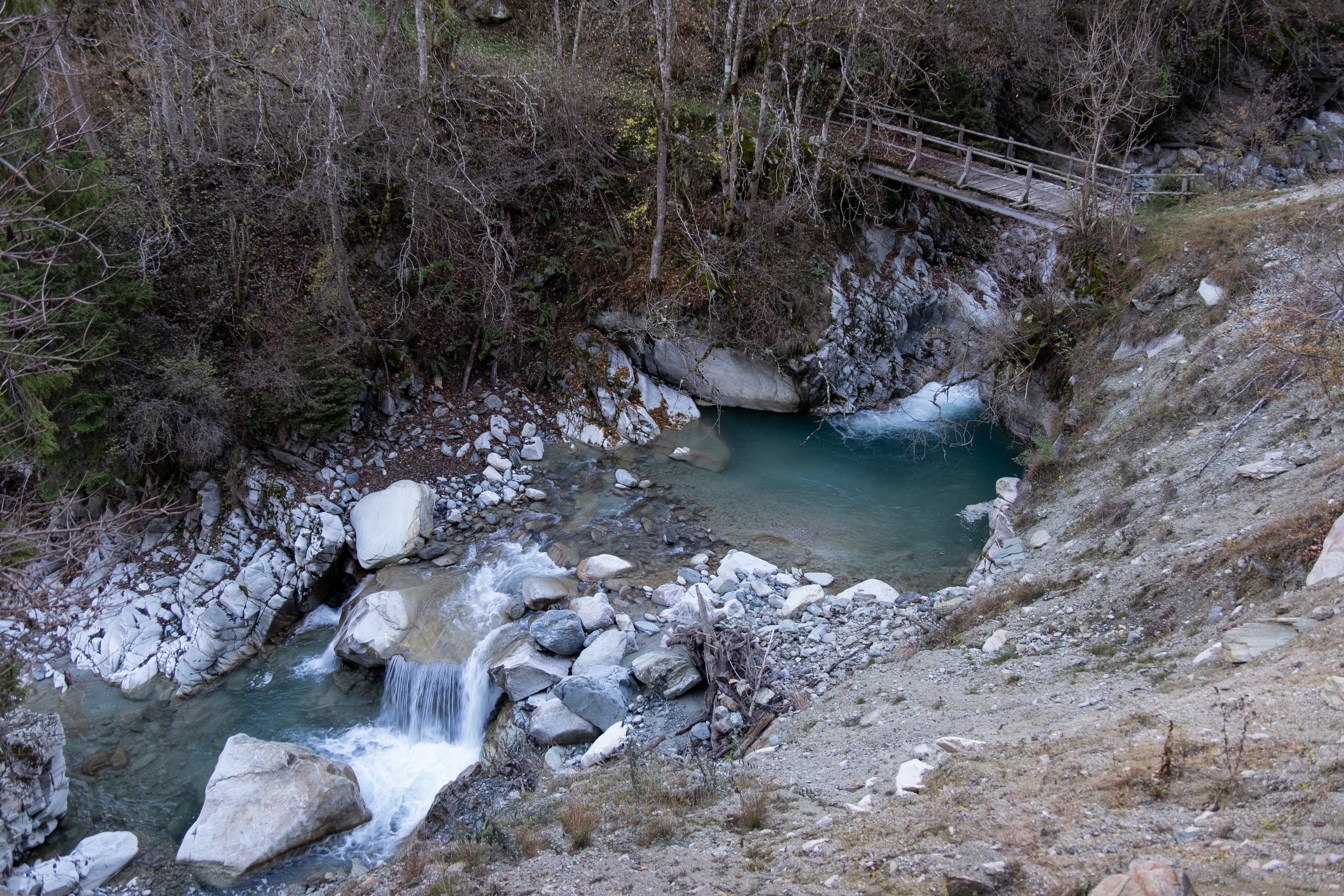
Under Fang.

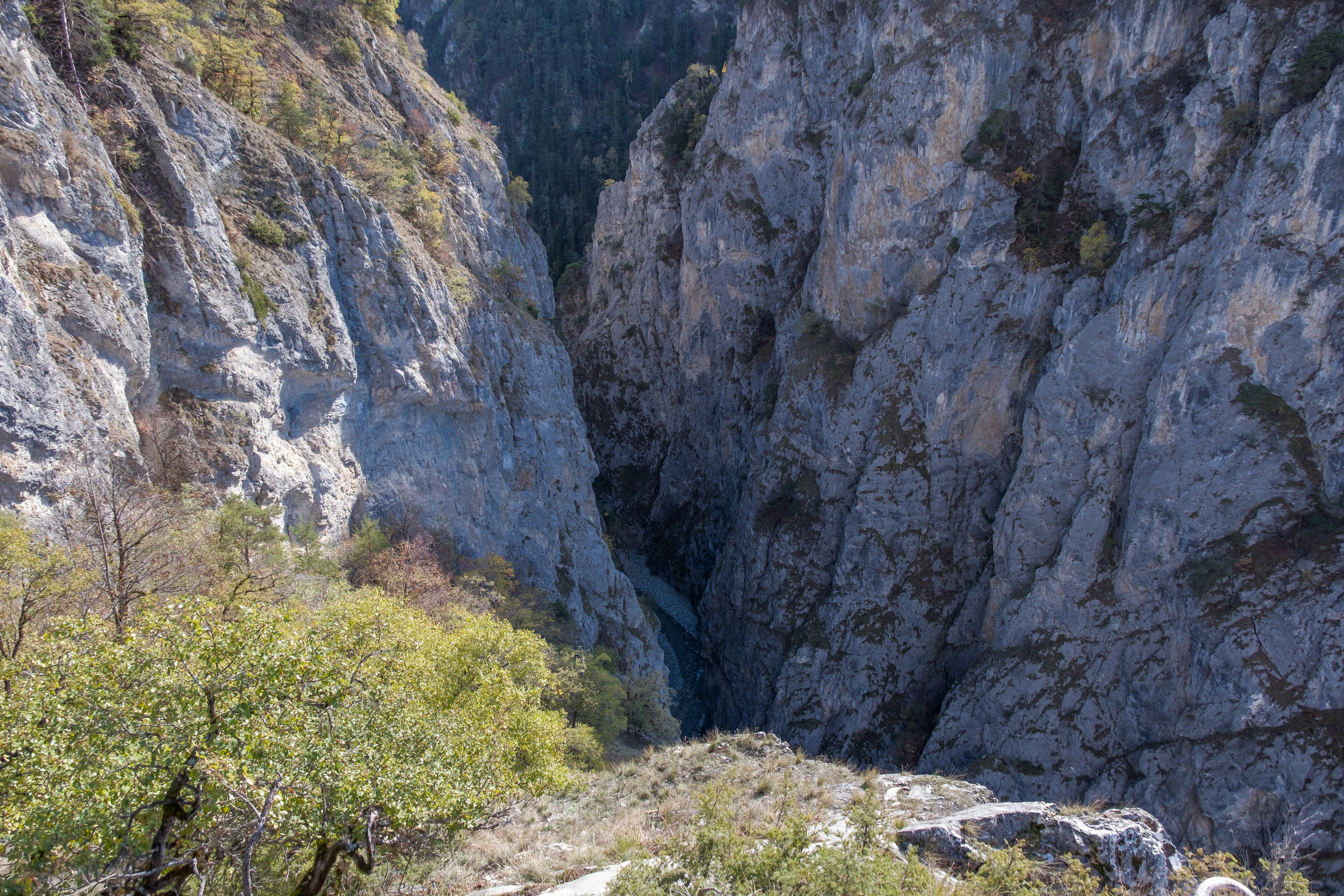
Precipices towards the Niouc suspension bridge.

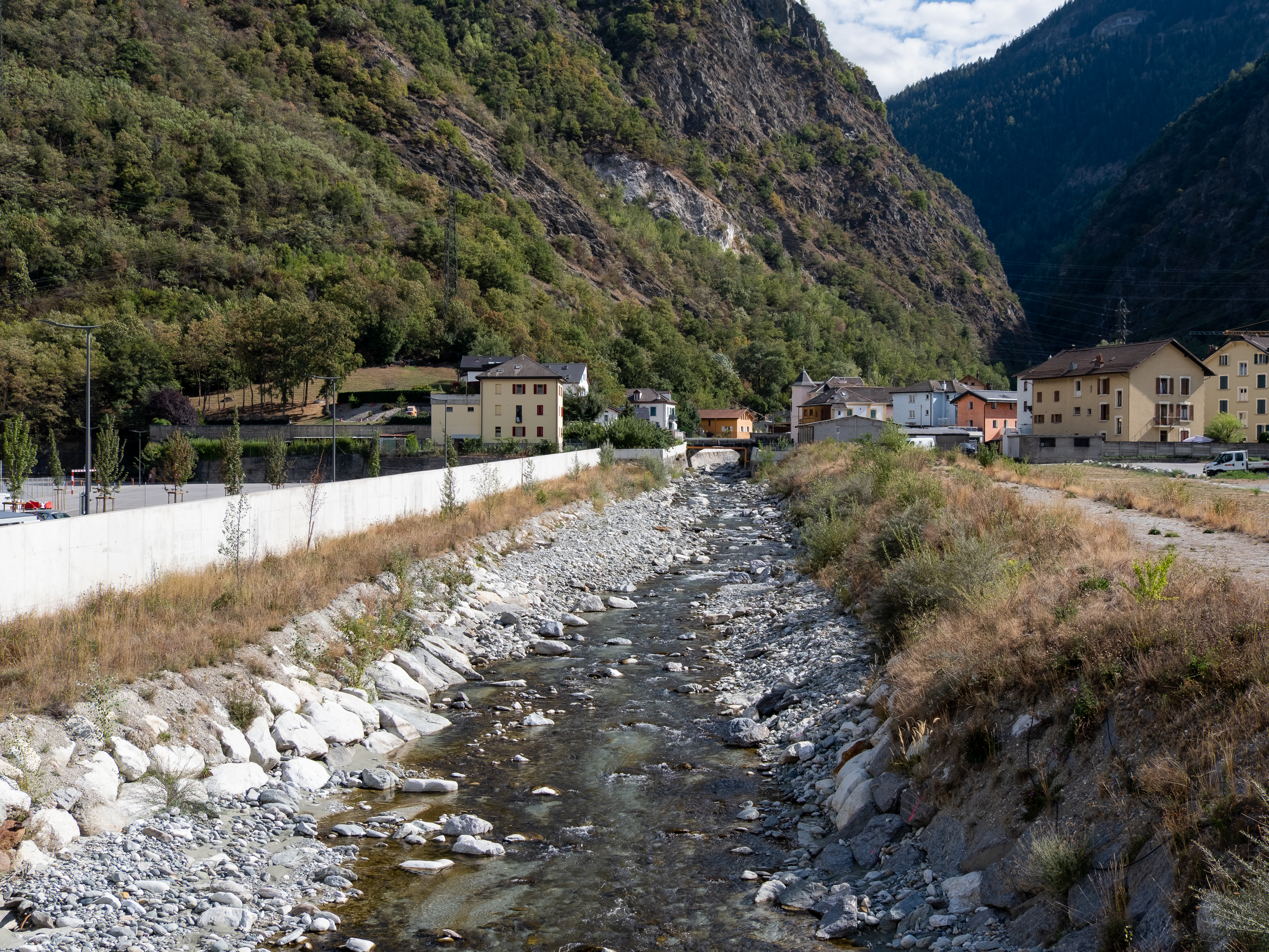
Chippis.

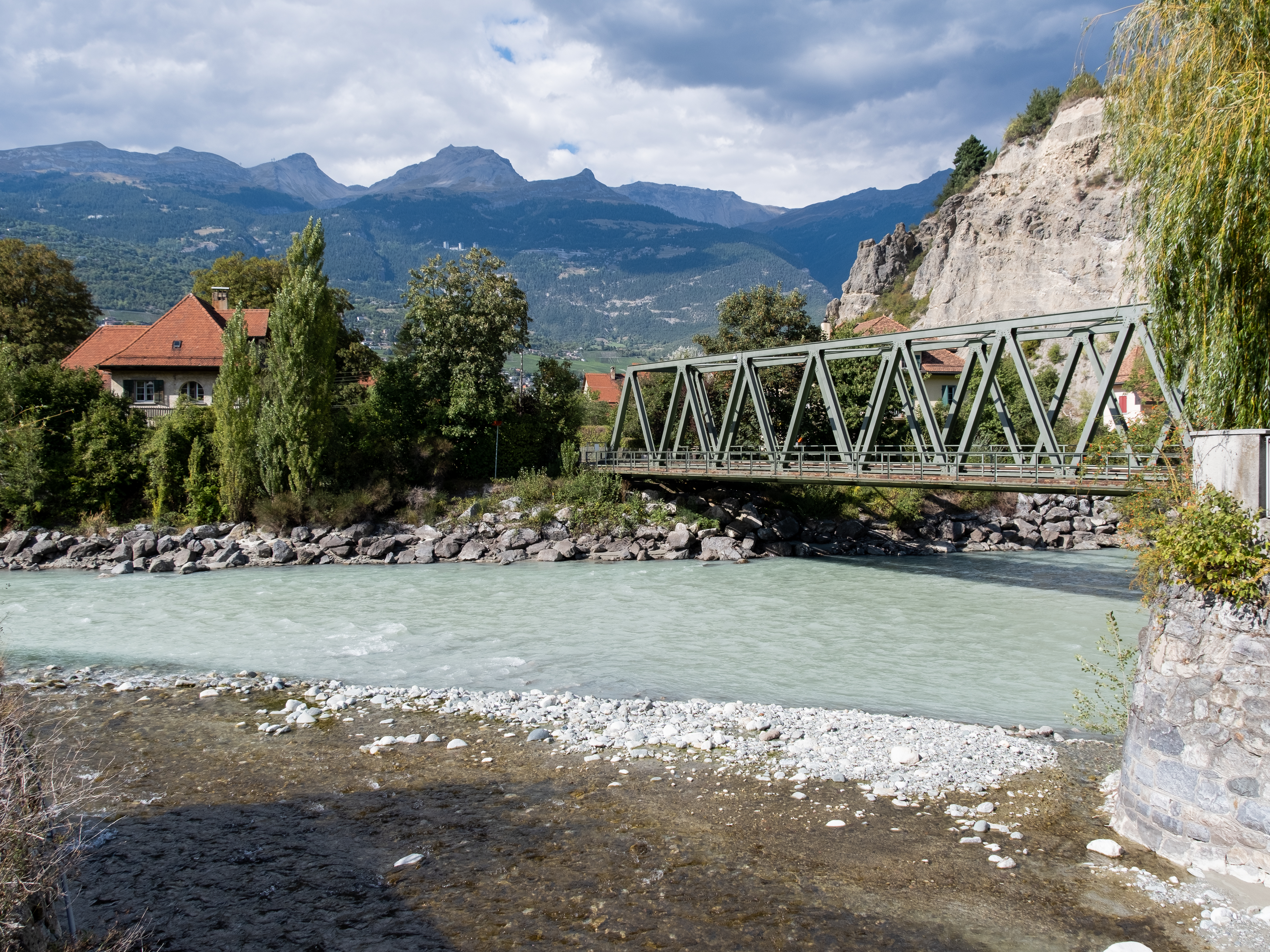
Confluence with the Rhône.

=== Hydrology ===
The Navizence basin covers an area of 255.5 km^{2}, with the Zinal valley accounting for 114.7 km^{2} and the Gougra basin covering 57.1 km^{2}. The watershed altitude ranges from 447 to 516 m, with an average altitude of 2,387 m. The surface composition of the watershed includes 27% rocks, 24% herbaceous vegetation, 21% forests (20% conifers and 1% mixed forests), 13% glaciers, and 9% loose rocks. The remaining area is divided among shrubby vegetation (3%), wetlands (2%), watercourses (1%), and urban areas (1%).

From 1981 to 2010, the average annual rainfall in the watershed was 1,020 mm/year, with precipitation increasing with altitude. May receives the highest precipitation, averaging 125 mm, and has the highest snow water equivalent at 310 mm.

The Navizence has different river regimes. It has a glacial regime from the Zinal Glacier to its confluence with the Gougra. From that point until it meets the Rhône, it is a snow-fed regime. The Strahler number of the Navizence is 5 until Vissoie, where the addition of the Moulins stream increases it to 6.

Two flow measurement discharges were established on the Navizence. The first station was located 250 m downstream of the Gougra mouth and operated from September 1928 to June 1935. The second station was situated 450 m downstream of the Vissoie road bridge and operated from January 1956 to December 1962. The average flow recorded during this period was 7.82 m3/s, with the lowest daily average of 0.89 m^{3}/s recorded in 1959. From 1961 to 1980, the average annual flow of the Navizence was 6.19 m^{3}/s at Vissoie and 7.21 m^{3}/s at Chippis.

Navizence discharge graphs

Monthly average discharges, instantaneous discharge peaks, and daily minimum discharges were measured at Vissoie between 1956 and 1962.

Monthly average flows measured from the Zinal Glacier to Chippis. (Note: The junction with the Gougra is located between Ayer and Mission, while the junction with the Torrent des Moulins is between Mission and Vissoie, and the junction with the Torrent de Fang is between Vissoie and Fang.)

=== Weather ===
Meteorological data from weather stations near the Anniviers Valley during 1991–2020.
Data	Station	Jan.	Feb.	Mar.	Apr.	May.	Jun.	Jul.	Aug.	Sep.	Oct.	Nov.	Dec.	Year
Mean maximum temperatures (°C)	Evolène/Villa (1,825 m)	0.7	0.9	4.4	8	11.8	15.7	18	17.5	13.7	10.1	4.7	1.8	8.9
Mean maximum temperatures (°C)	Grächen (1,605 m)	0.9	1.5	5.4	9.3	14	18.3	20.4	19.8	15.5	10.8	4.7	1.4	10.2
Mean maximum temperatures (°C)	Zermatt (1,638 m)	0.8	1.7	5.7	9.8	13.9	17.8	20	19.6	15.4	11.2	5.1	1.5	10.2
Mean minimum temperatures (°C)	Evolène/Villa (1,825 m)	-5.5	-6.0	-3.5	-0.8	2.9	6.3	8.2	8.6	5.3	2.3	-2.1	-4.6	0.9
Mean minimum temperatures (°C)	Grächen (1,605 m)	-5.4	-5.6	-2.7	0.4	4.3	7.9	9.8	9.9	6.5	3.2	-1.4	-4.4	1.9
Mean minimum temperatures (°C)	Zermatt (1,638 m)	-7.4	-7.3	-4.0	-0.7	3.2	6.6	8.3	8.3	5	1.4	-3.1	-6.3	0.3
Precipitation (mm)	Evolène/Villa (1,825 m)	49	40	41	50	81	81	88	85	55	54	55	55	734
Precipitation (mm)	Grächen (1,605 m)	42	31	37	47	69	58	56	62	43	57	56	50	607
Precipitation (mm)	Zermatt (1,638 m)	42	30	33	40	77	70	59	68	51	57	65	47	640
Sunshine (hours)	Evolène/Villa (1,825 m)	110	119	159	164	178	192	212	194	169	143	104	96	1,840
Sunshine (hours)	Grächen (1,605 m)	-	-	-	-	-	-	-	-	-	-	-	-	-
Sunshine (hours)	Zermatt (1,638 m)	94	109	151	147	155	171	185	176	156	133	89	83	1,648
Source: MeteoSwiss.

=== Developments ===
The major developments along the Navizence are located from the Chippis mill to its confluence with the Rhône. In this section, the river has been straightened with rock blocks on the left bank and a stone wall on the right bank. The remaining part of the river has been preserved in its natural state, except for stabilizations around Mottec and near certain structures.

Two compensation basins are situated along the Navizence, at Mottec and Vissoie. The first basin is utilized to regulate the flow towards Vissoie during the summer and can also pump water towards the Moiry Dam during off-peak hours. The Vissoie basin is designed to supply water to the Vissoie-Chippis open-flowing gallery.

=== Fauna ===
In samplings conducted in the 1980s, 32 taxa of benthic macroinvertebrates were recorded in the Navizence. These taxa mainly consist of insect larvae, including species of Tricladida, one of Hydrachnidia, and two of Oligochaeta. Phyla involved are Platyhelminthes (Crenobia alpina), Annelida (Lumbricidae and Tubificidae), and arthropods from the orders Ephemeroptera, Plecoptera, Coleoptera, Trichoptera, and Diptera.

The rapids at the entrance of the Anniviers Valley pose a challenge for fish migration. In the 1930s, brown trout (Salmo trutta fario) populations were introduced by catching them in the Rhône Valley and releasing them in various locations in the Anniviers Valley. From 2012 to 2014, 15,000 brown trout were released annually into the Navizence River from the Sierre fish farm.

== Flooding history ==
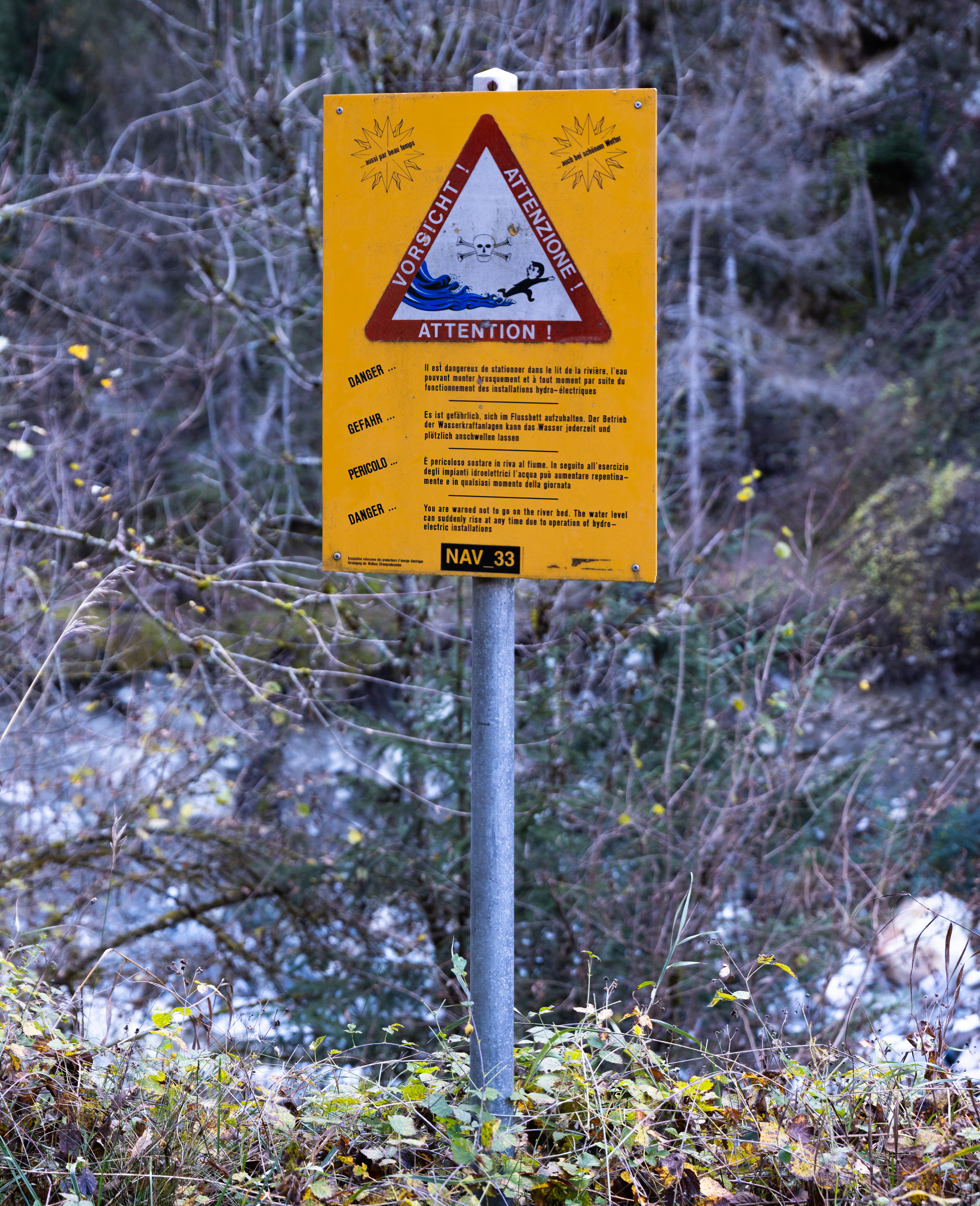
Navizence flood warning sign.

The Navizence experienced two floods that resulted in a significant overflow. The first flood occurred in August 1834, caused by the obstruction of the river's flow at the Zinal Glacier by a proglacial lake. This obstruction was a result of an exceptionally dry summer, heavy rainfall, and a south wind. When the lake suddenly burst, it swept away several bridges, barns, stables, and mills in Ayer. In Chippis, the river deposited a layer of sand and silt measuring between 1 and 2 meters.

In July 2018, a new overflow occurred due to a violent thunderstorm covering 35 km^{2} and the melting of large amounts of snow. The Navizence reached a 120 m^{3}/s flow, which is half the Rhône nominal flow. The overflow impacted various areas between Zinal and Chippis: the FC Anniviers football stadium was submerged, and a bridge in Chippis had to be urgently demolished by rescuers. The sewage treatment plant in Anniviers at Fang suffered significant damage, leading to the direct discharge of wastewater from Zinal and Grimentz into the Navizence. The estimated damage from the event was between 30 and 40 million Swiss francs.

== Activities ==
=== Water use ===
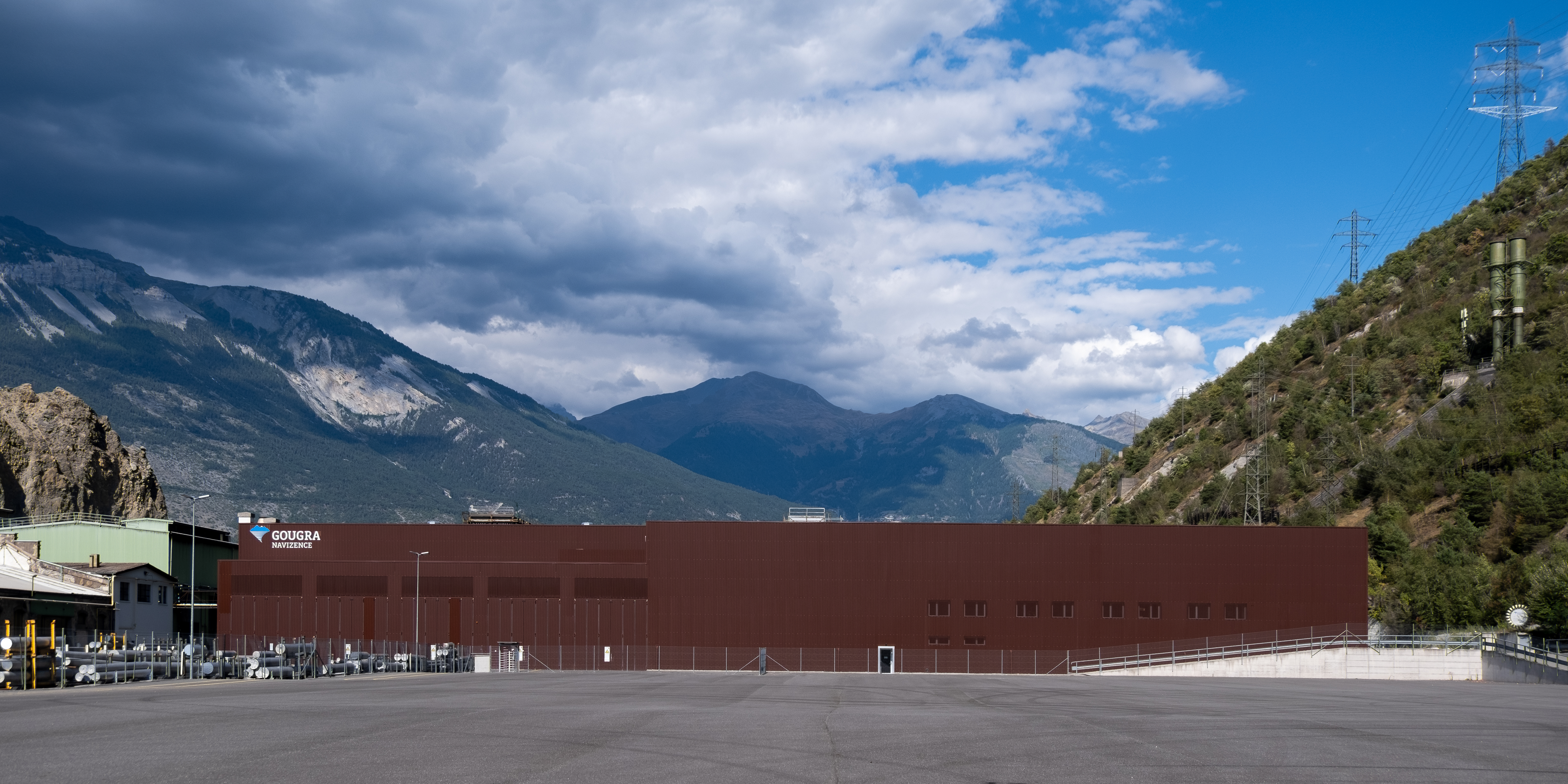
The "Navizence" power plant in Chippis.

Water from the Navizence has been utilized for hydroelectric power generation since 1908 in Chippis by the "Navizence" hydroelectric plant. This plant initially supplied electricity to the Alusuisse factory in Chippis from a water intake in Vissoie. A new plant harnessing the Navizence was constructed in Vissoie in 1909, and the "Navizence" plant underwent renovation in the 1950s. The Moiry Dam was constructed between 1954 and 1958 on the Gougra River, along with a network of galleries in the Anniviers Valley, enabling water to be pumped from the Navizence from Mottec to the dam. Local hydroelectric operators have a total of nine intakes in the Navizence basins. The maintenance of a minimum discharge at each intake is regulated by the Federal Law on Water Protection of January 24, 1991. At the Vissoie intake, the Navizence flow must be at least 470 l/s before abstraction.

There are ten groundwater drinking water intakes in the Navizence watershed. Additionally, water is extracted at eight locations along the banks of the Navizence to supply irrigation channels (bisses): the Gillou alp, the Sarrasin channel in Saint-Jean and Chalais, the Briey channel in Saint-Luc and Chalais, the Chararogne and Ricard channel in Chalais and Chippis, as well as the Lacher, Tinda, and Neuf Bénou channel. Furthermore, a sewage treatment plant releases treated water into the Navizence at Fang.

Graphs of Navizence withdrawal rates

Average monthly water withdrawal rates from the Navizence River for the Navizence power station.

Average monthly water withdrawal rates from the Navizence River for the Vissoie power station.

=== Tourism ===
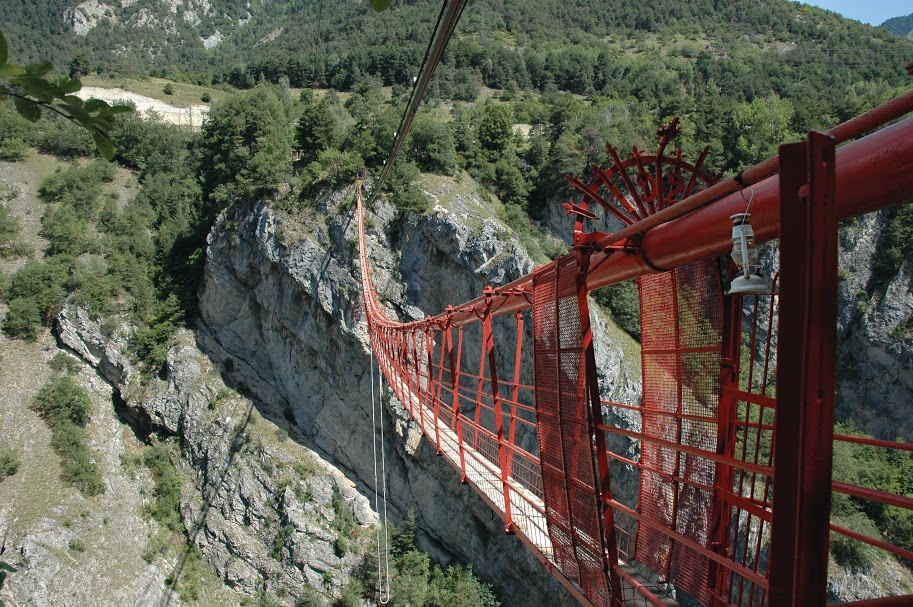
The Niouc suspension bridge.

Since 1922, the Niouc suspension bridge has spanned the Navizence River at a height of nearly 200 meters. Visitors can cross the bridge and participate in activities such as bungee jumping or pendulum jumping. In 2021, a via ferrata route was made accessible either by crossing the suspension bridge or starting from Chippis.

=== Environmental protection ===
Two sectors of the Navizence watershed are classified in the federal inventory of alluvial areas of national importance: the Plat de la Lée (30.85 ha) and the Zinal Glacier (186.09 ha). Additionally, the downstream part of the watershed intersects the Pfynwald-Illgraben area, which is included in the Federal Inventory of Landscapes and Natural Monuments.

Among the aquifers in the watershed, 34% are highly vulnerable to pollution penetration, while 24% have a high vulnerability. This indicates that these aquifers lack adequate protection from low-permeability layers.

Fishing is prohibited in the section of the Navizence between the mouth of the Pinsec stream and the Vissoie accumulation basin, as it is designated as a reserve. However, fishing is permitted downstream of the Gougra mouth with a cantonal permit.

== In culture ==
The theater troupe in Vissoie is called "Les Compagnons de la Navizence." In 1993, an exhibition titled Oh! Navizence, conceptualized by Jean-Jacques Le Joncour, was held in Sierre. The exhibition depicted the banks of the Navizence in a post-apocalyptic future scenario set in 2009.

== Bibliography ==
- Un aménagement aux confins des vallées d'Anniviers et de Tourtemagne (PDF) (in French). Sierre: Forces Motrices de la Gougra SA. 2014.
- ETEC; PhycoEco (December 2010). Navizence : Observation de la qualité des eaux de surface (in French). Sion and La Chaux-de-Fonds: Service de la protection de l’environnement.
- Knapp, Charles; Borel, Maurice; Attinger, V (1902). "Navizance, Navizence ou Navisance". Dictionnaire géographique de la Suisse : Langenberg – Pyramides (in French). Vol. 3. Société neuchâteloise de géographie. pp. 457–458.
