= Mettelhorn =

Mountain of the Swiss Pennine Alps

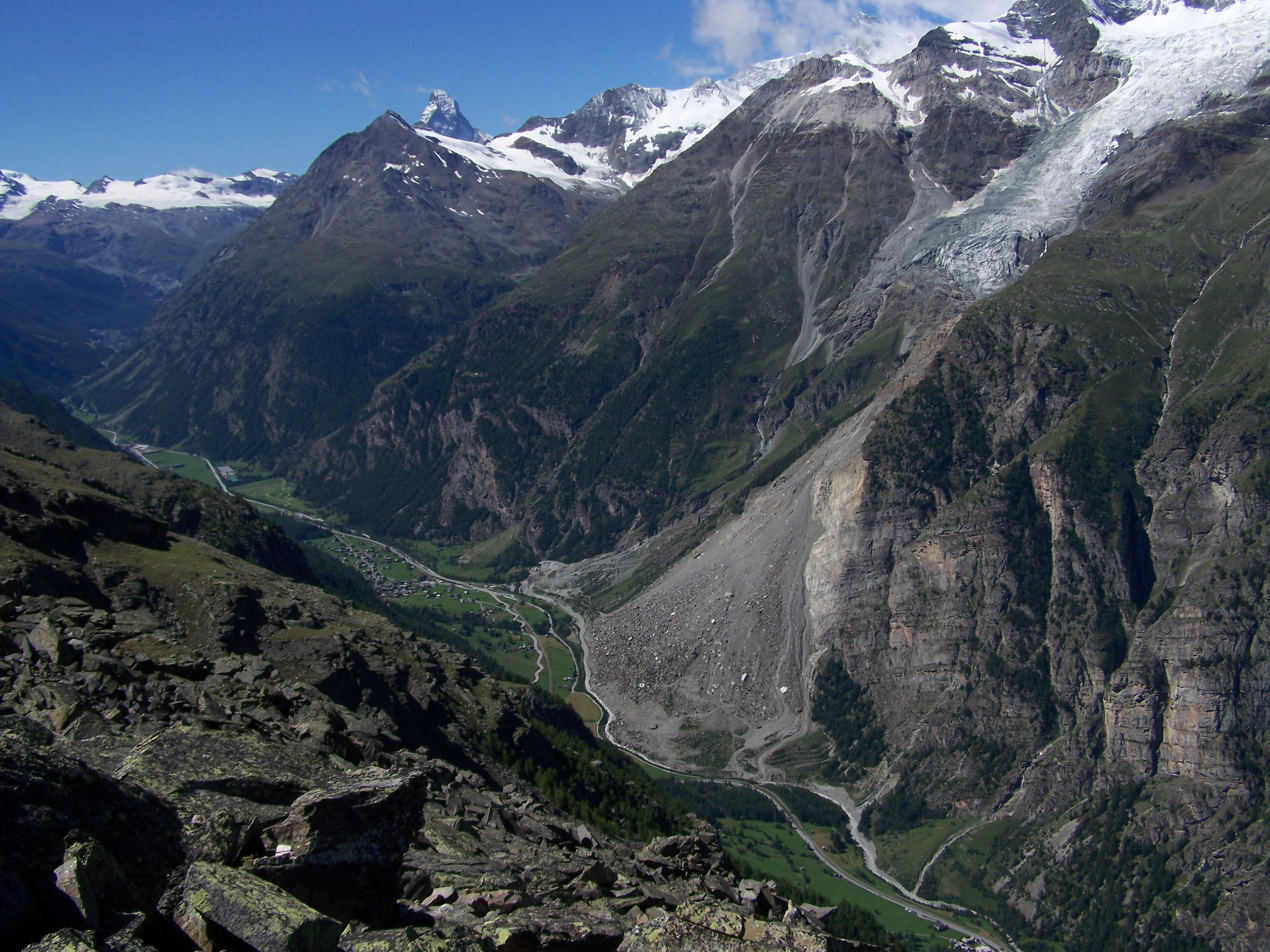
- The Mettelhorn above the Mattertal (center left)

Highest point
- Elevation: 3,406 m (11,175 ft)
- Prominence: 240 m (790 ft)
- Parent peak: Monte Rosa
- Coordinates: 46°03′26″N 7°44′33″E

Geography
- Location within Switzerland
- Location: Valais, Switzerland
- Parent range: Pennine Alps

The Mettelhorn is a mountain of the Swiss Pennine Alps, located near Zermatt in the canton of Valais.

The Mettelhorn provides excellent acclimatization opportunities, especially if one climbs its sister peaks Platthorn and Wisshorn on the same day. Hiking from Zermatt to the Mettelhorn takes about six hours uphill and four hours downwards. The summit can be reached by almost any active hiker with some mountain experience.

The climb to the Mettelhorn begins from Zermatt; hikers start on the Edelweiss path, the path goes through a forest before coming to the Edelweiss Restaurant; this section takes about one hour. The forest section ends here and a wider gorge opens as the path runs past the Triftbach river. There are also plenty of signs with photos about the wildflowers growing on the paths' surroundings. After the Edelweiss, another 90 minutes of hiking leads to the Hotel Trift; the path is easy to follow and scenery rich with a few mountain views. One can see the Unter Gabelhorn mountain on the left side with several smaller peaks. After the Hotel Trift the path veers left towards north east going towards Zinal Rothorn, Platthorn and Mettelhorn mountains. The path going on the Rothornhütte (the SAC hut at the foot of the Zinal Rothorn) turns soon towards off the main path north westwards (all turnings are well signed), and an additional path leads south east towards the Wisshorn. After one hour of ascent from the Hotel Trift the Triftchumme meadow appears, where occasionally sheep graze. At the other side of meadow is the Platthorn. Eventually one comes on the saddle called Furggi pass. From here one can see the Mettelhorn and decide if to climb the Platthorn or to go over the Hohlicht Gletscher glacier first. Going up on the Platthorn takes about 30 minutes. On the north side is the Unter Äschorn and also the Weisshorn can be seen. The Glacier is steep and crampons are recommended, even through the glacier does not provide major difficulties to walk over; the Glacier section takes about 30 minutes. The Mettelhorn has a steep face but can be walked up; scree can give some trouble on the way up. The views from the summit are spectacular. On the top of the mountain one can see more famous mountains like; Weisshorn, Dom, Monte Rosa, the North Face of the Matterhorn, Ober Gabelhorn and Zinal Rothorn.

== Photo gallery ==
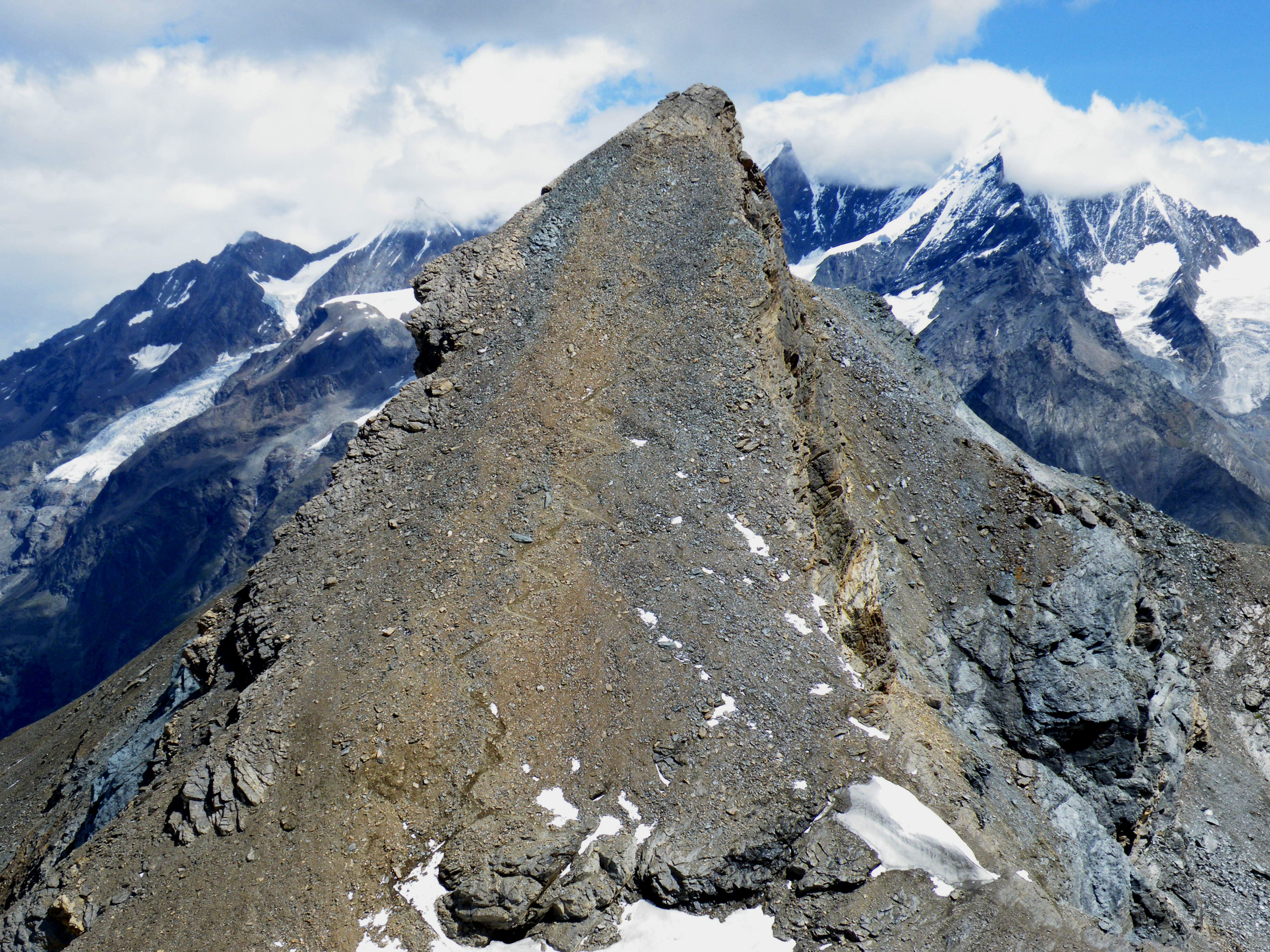
Mettelhorn as seen from the west side

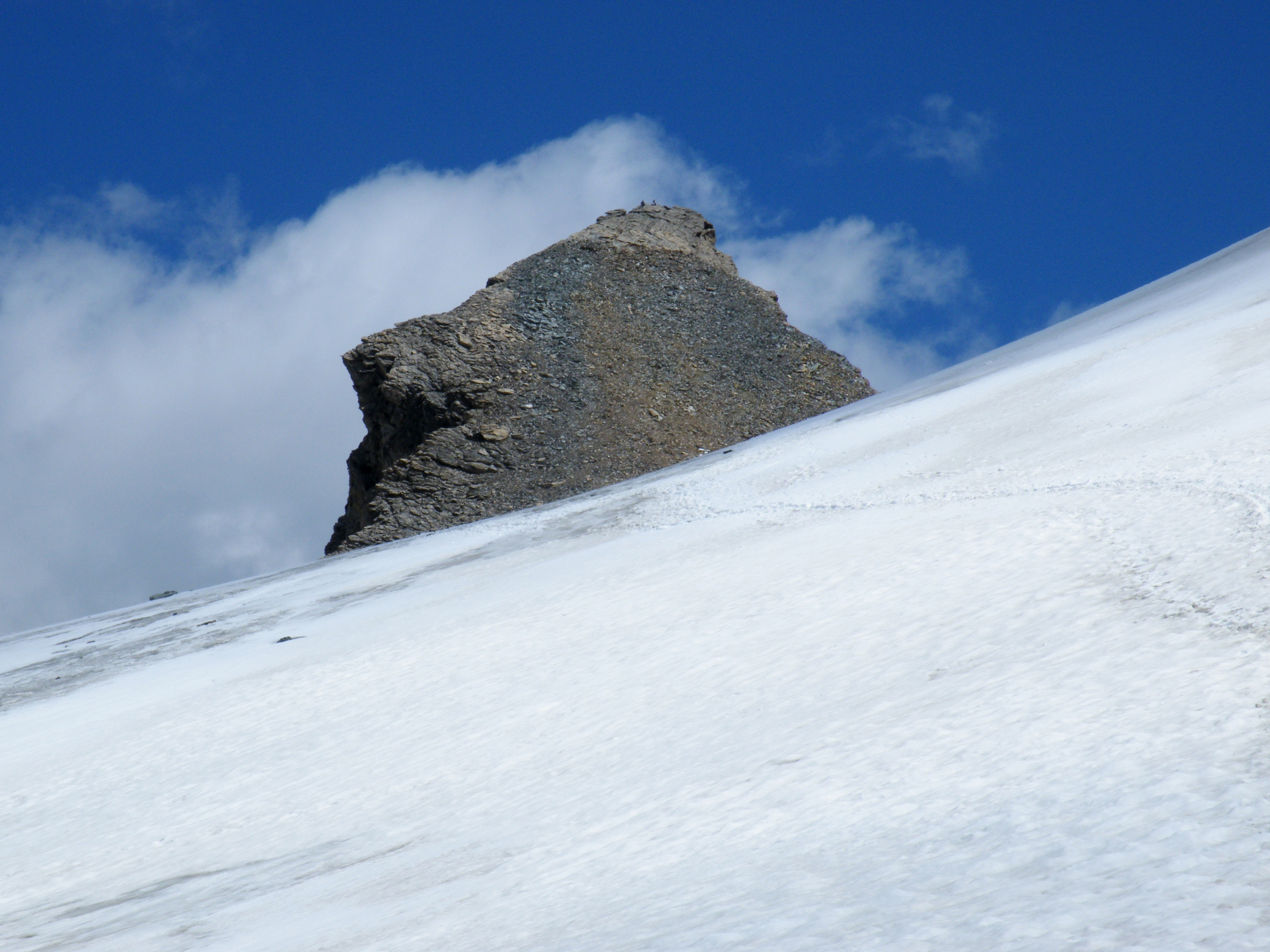
Glacier between the Mettelhorn and Platthorn mountains

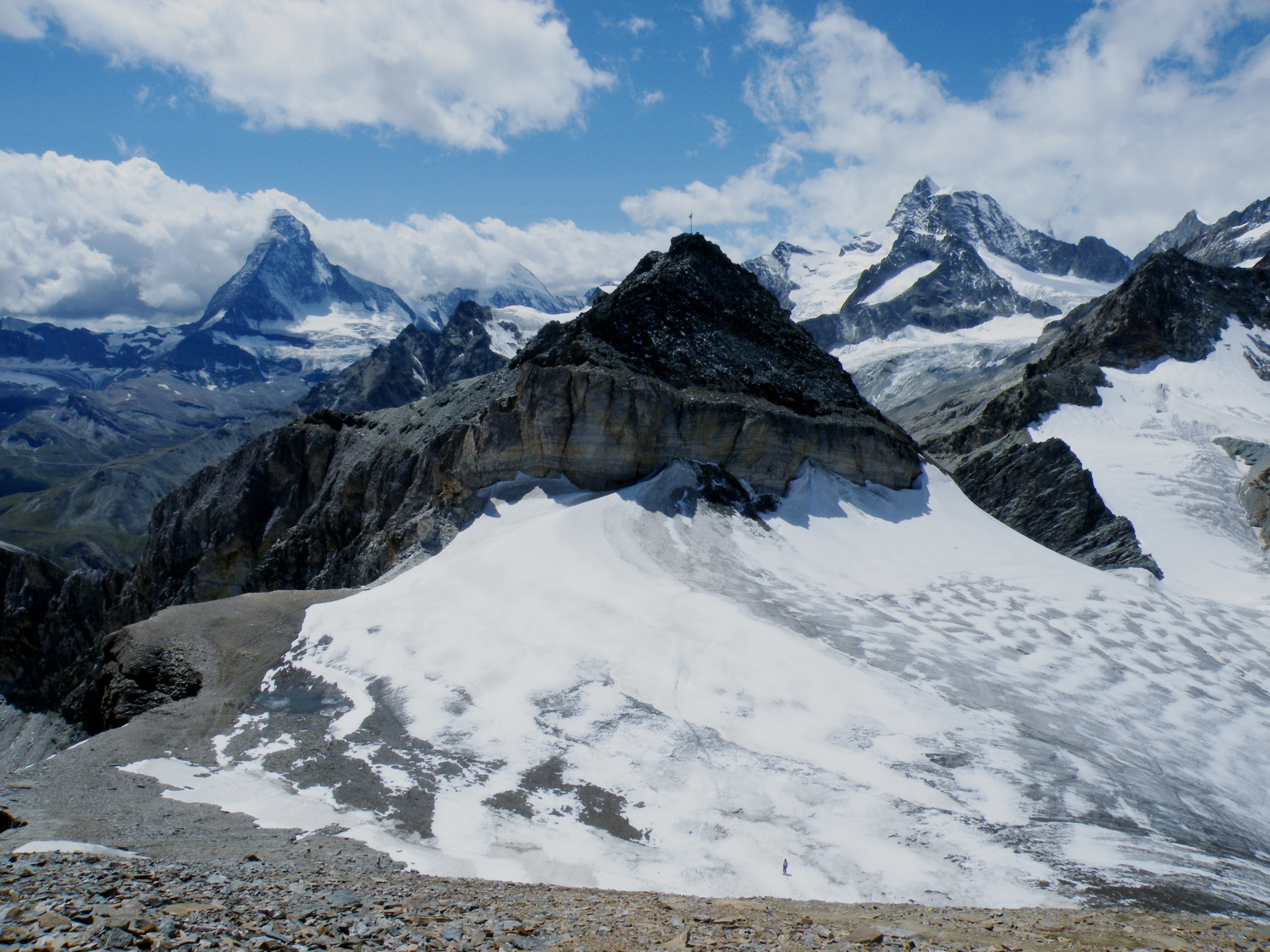
View on the Platthorn mountain

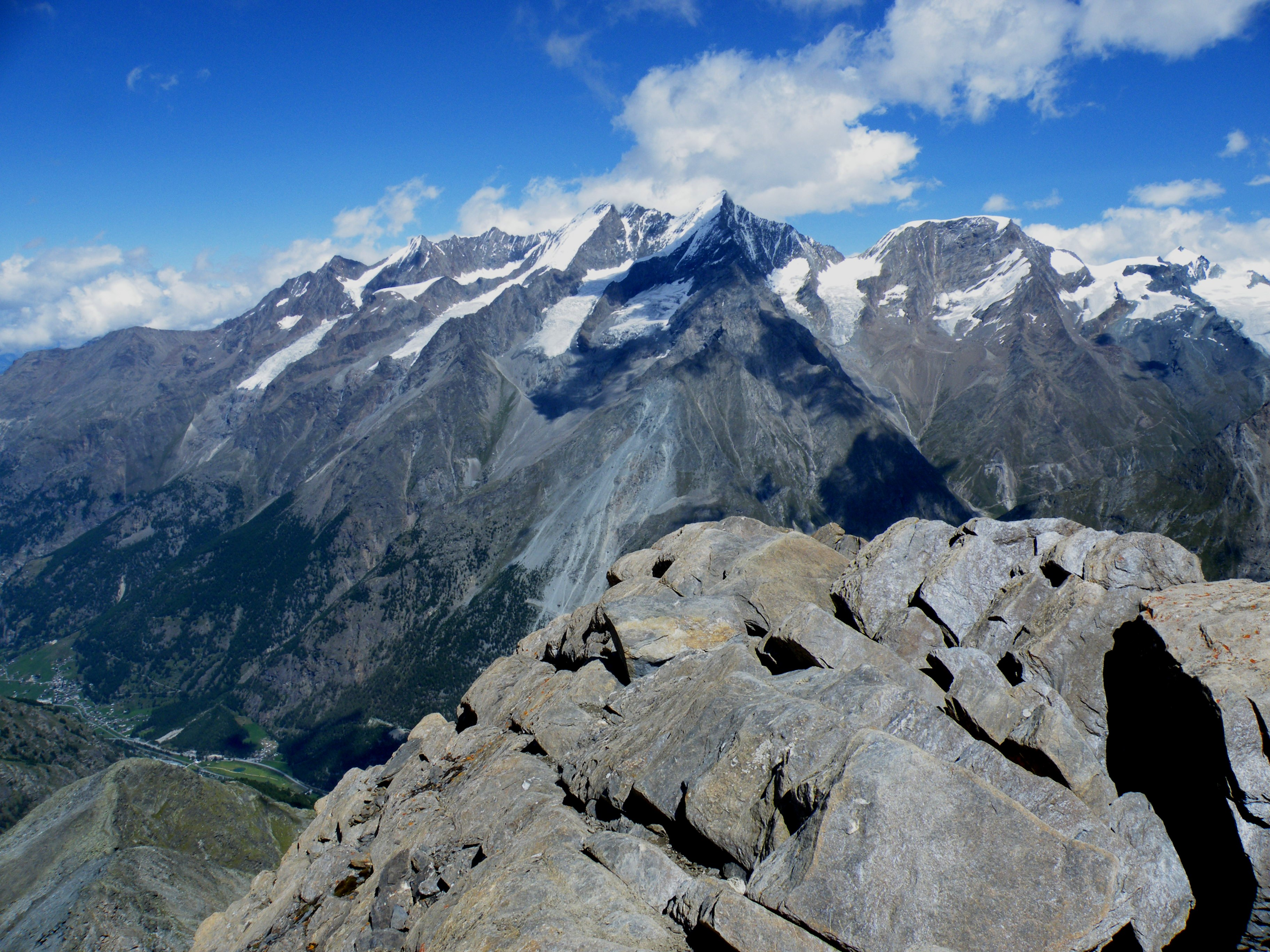
View towards Randa and the Dom mountain

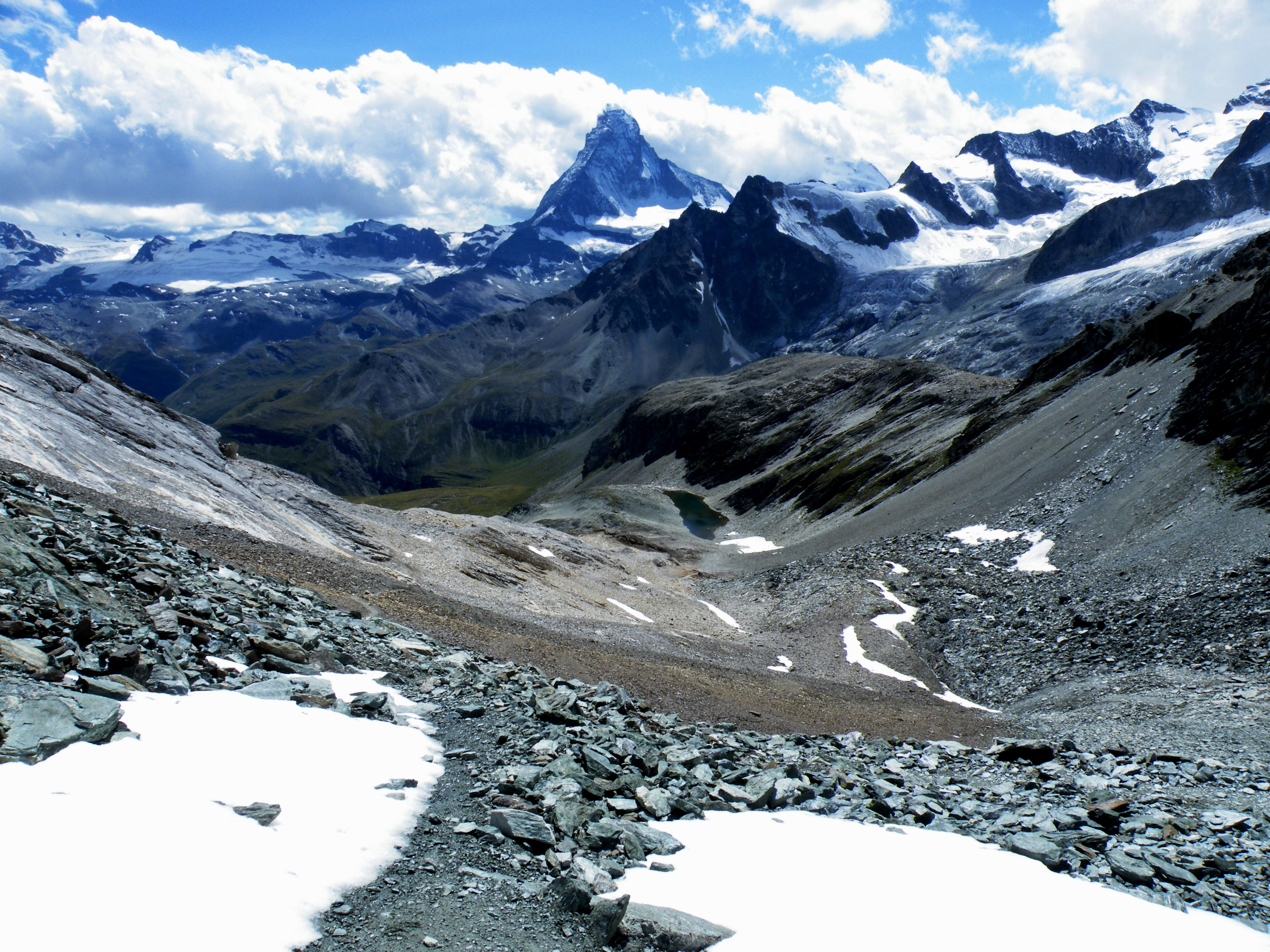
On the Furggi Pass, Matterhorn at the background

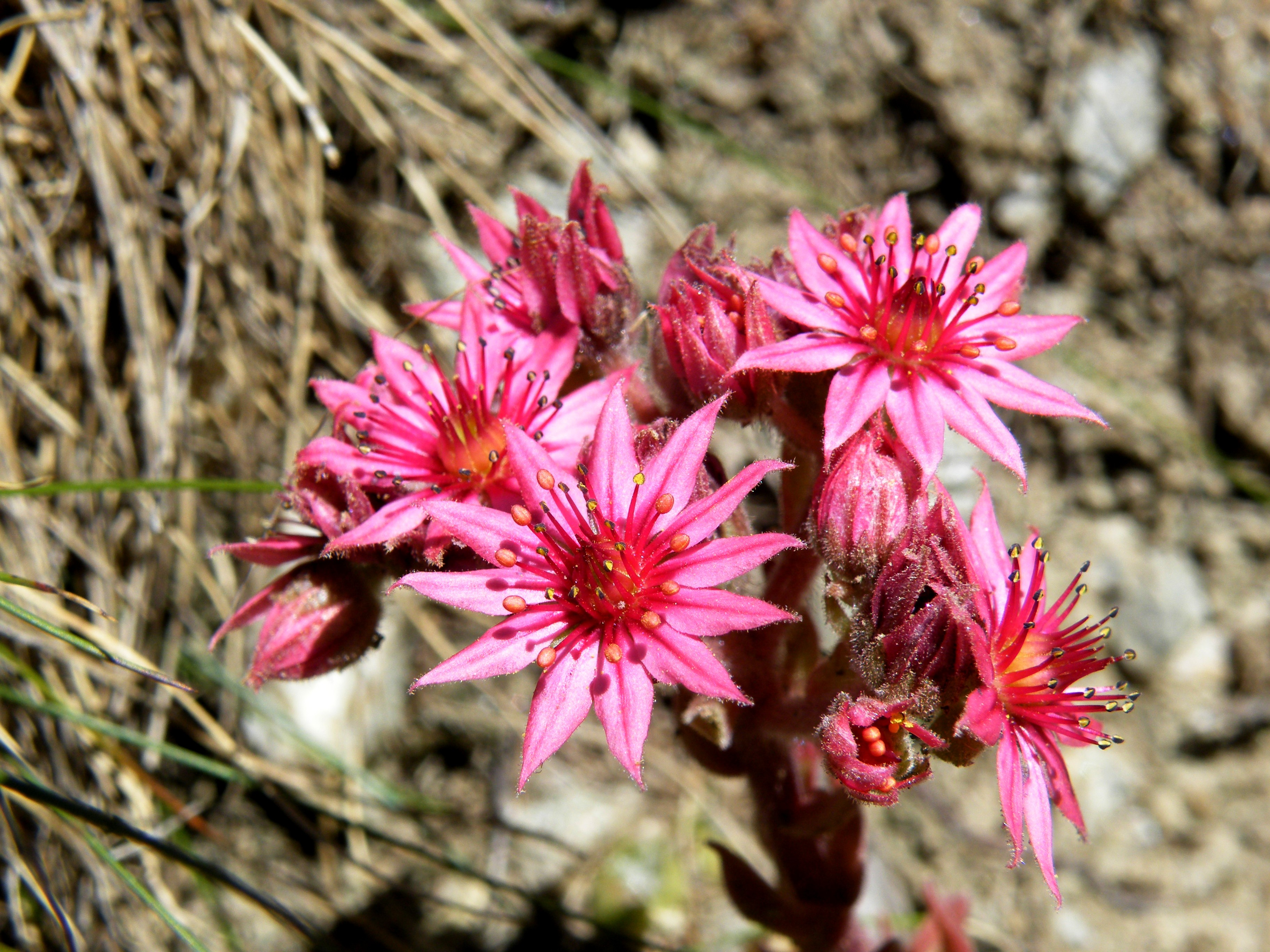
Sempervivum arachnoideum

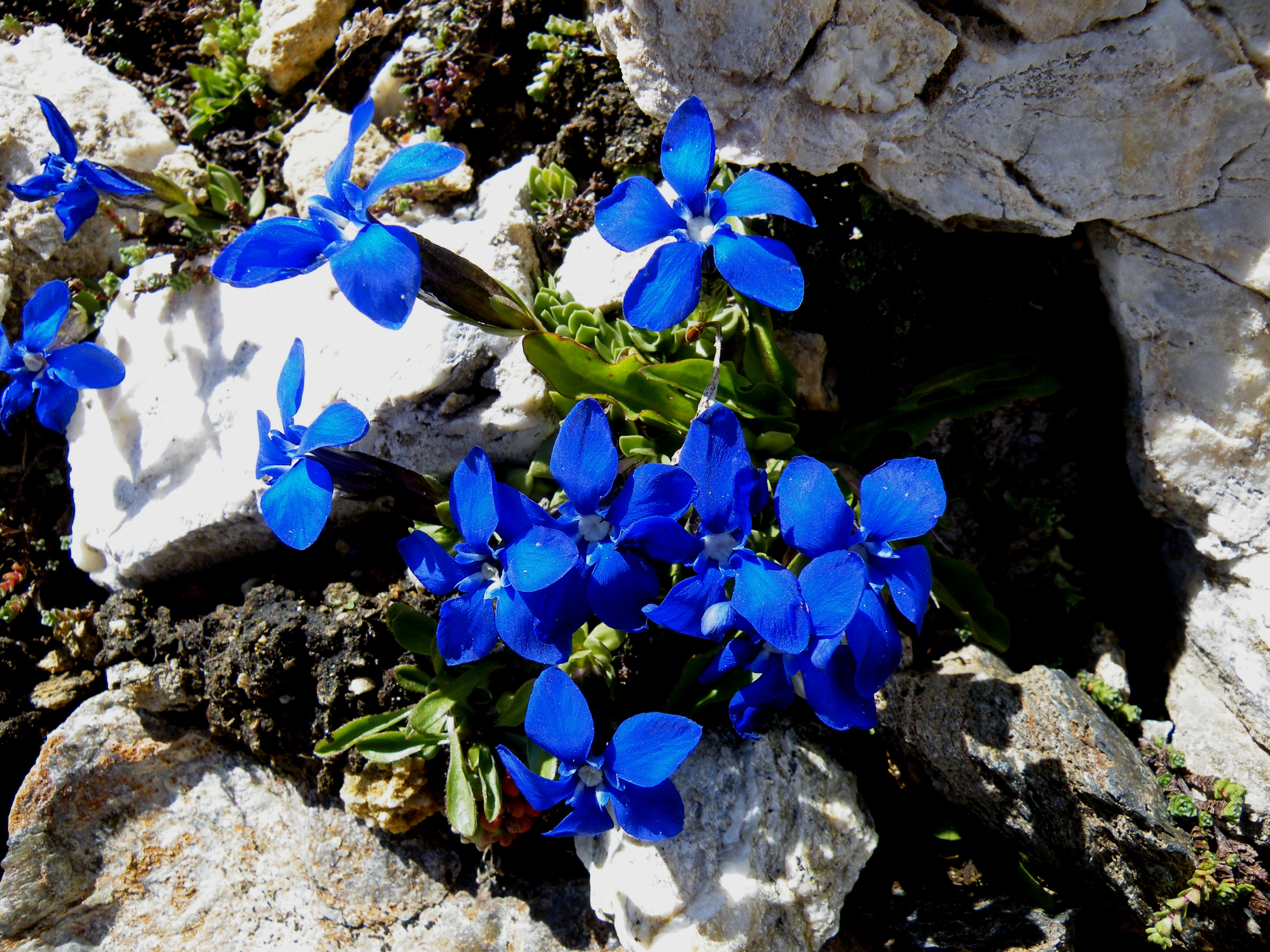
Gentiana acaulis

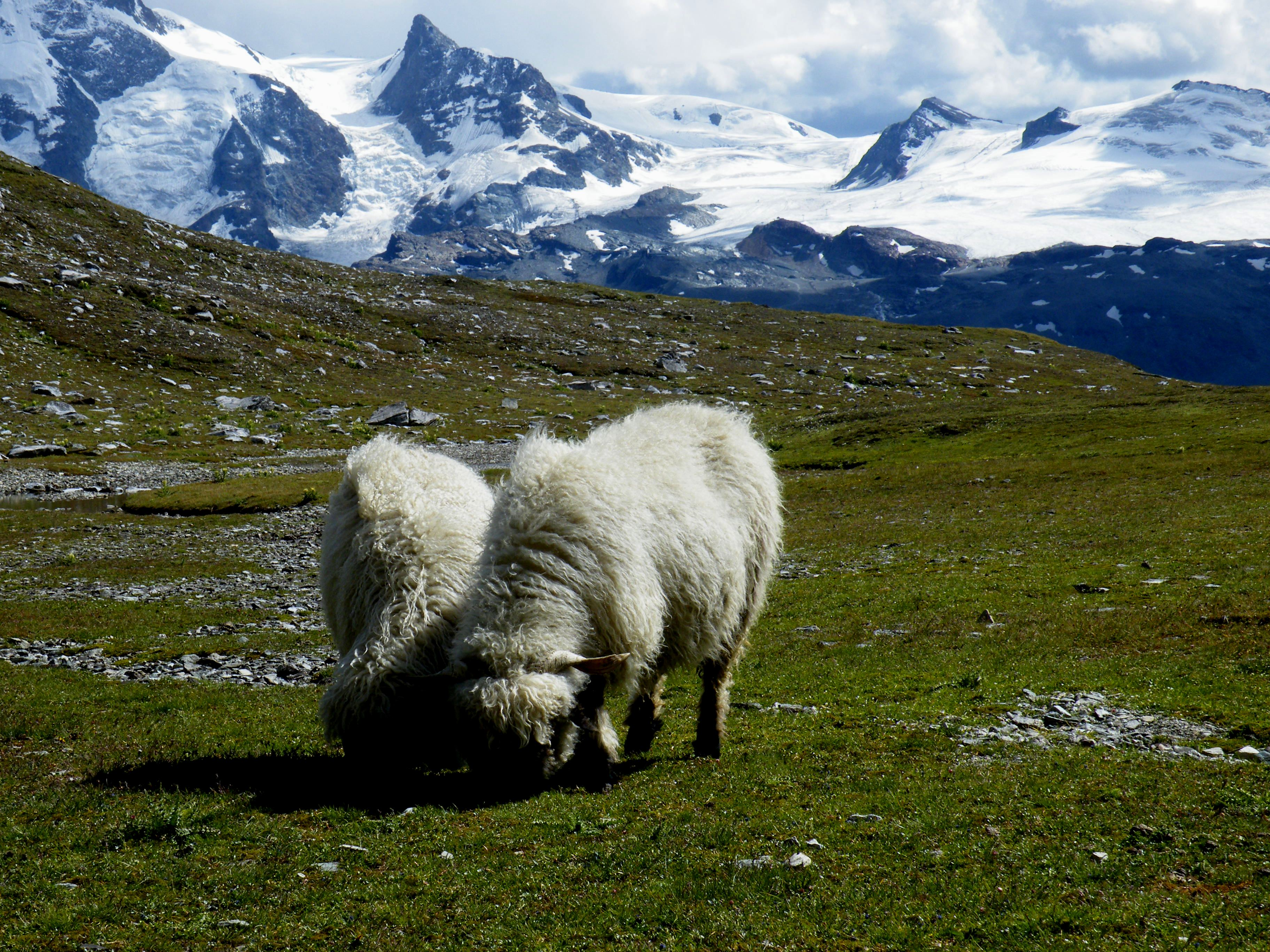
Sheep on a mountain meadow
