= Pointe Sud de Moming =

Mountain in Switzerland

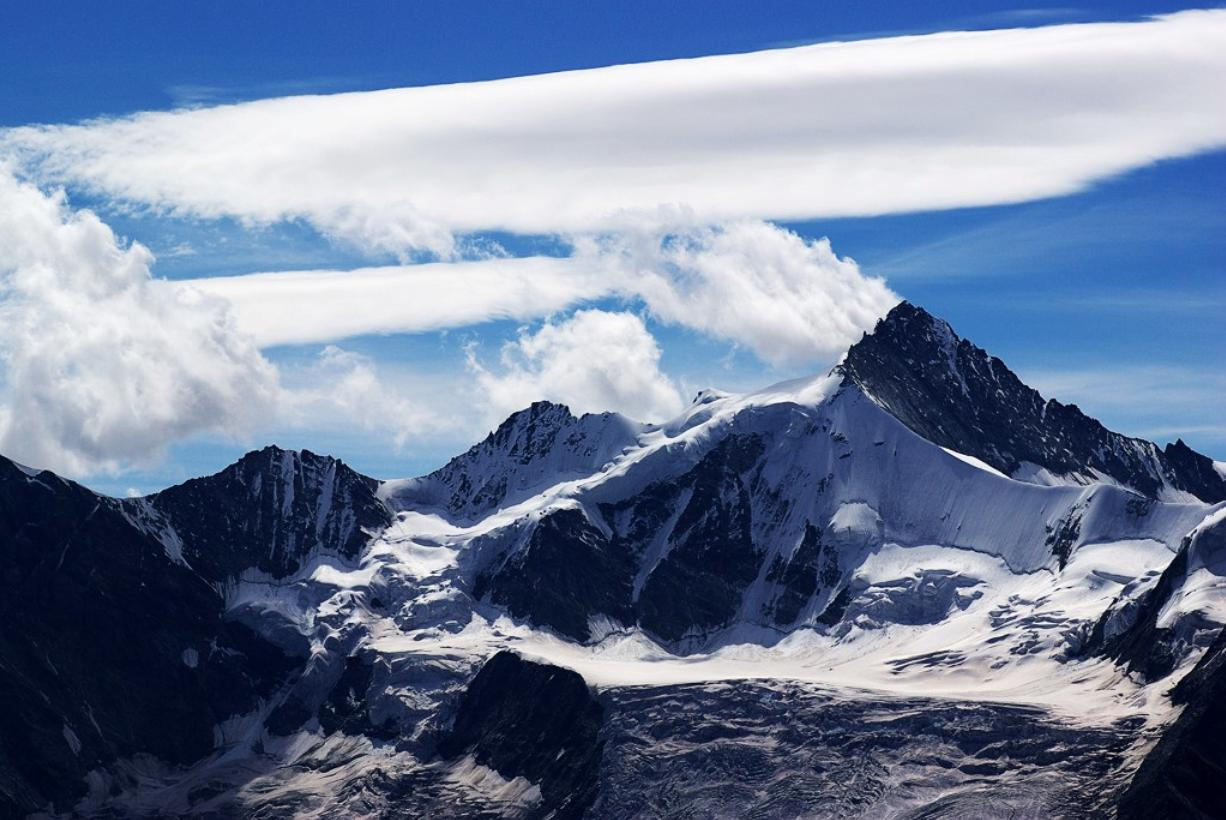
- Pointe Sud de Moming (centre) and Zinalrothorn (right)

Highest point
- Elevation: 3,963 m (13,002 ft)
- Prominence: 70 m (230 ft)
- Parent peak: Zinalrothorn
- Coordinates: 46°4′22.5″N 7°41′43″E

Geography
- Location within Switzerland
- Location: Valais, Switzerland
- Parent range: Pennine Alps

The Pointe Sud de Moming (3,963 m) is a mountain of the Swiss Pennine Alps, located west of Täsch in the canton of Valais. It lies on the range between the Weisshorn and the Zinalrothorn, south of the Col de Moming.

== See also ==
- Pointe Nord de Moming
