= Pointe Nord de Moming =

Mountain in Switzerland

- Location within Switzerland

Highest point
- Elevation: 3,863 m (12,674 ft)
- Prominence: 86 m (282 ft)
- Parent peak: Zinalrothorn
- Coordinates: 46°4′39.7″N 7°42′0″E

Geography
- Location: Valais, Switzerland
- Parent range: Pennine Alps

The Pointe Nord de Moming (3,863 m) is a mountain of the Swiss Pennine Alps, located west of Täsch in the canton of Valais. It lies on the range between the Weisshorn and the Zinalrothorn, north of the Col de Moming.

== See also ==
- Pointe Sud de Moming
