= Moming Glacier =

Glacier in Switzerland

- Glacier de Moming
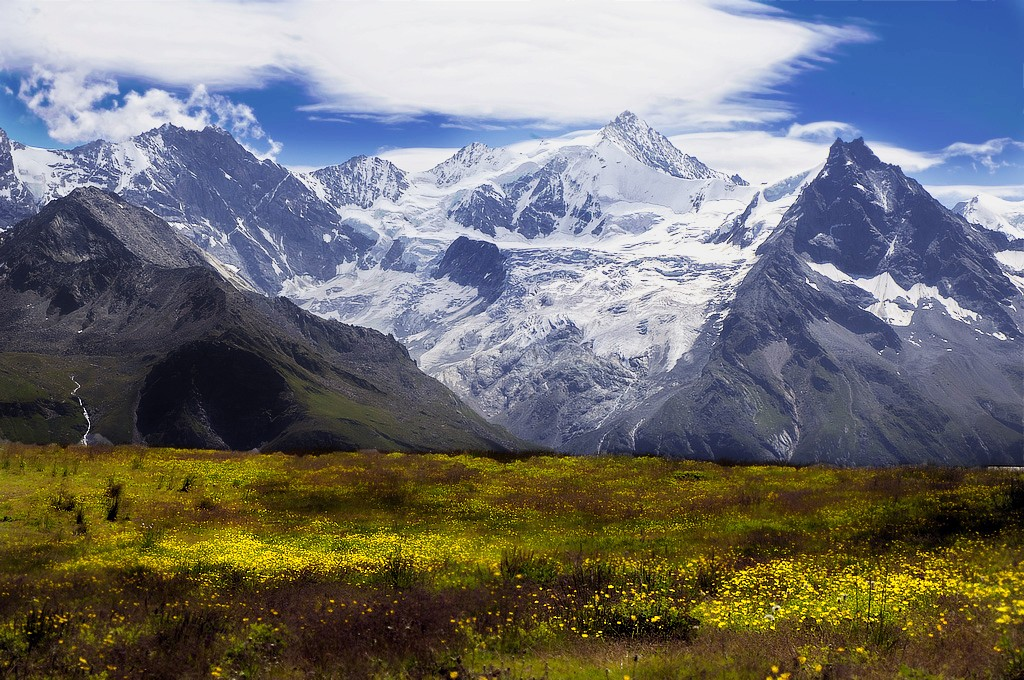
- Glacier de Moming and Zinalrothorn
- Interactive map of Moming Glacier
- Location: Valais, Switzerland
- Coordinates: 46°4′50″N 7°40′33″E
- Length: 3km

The Moming Glacier (French: Glacier de Moming) is a 3 km long glacier (2005) situated in the Pennine Alps in the canton of Valais in Switzerland. In 1973 it had an area of 6.39 km^{2}.

== See also ==
- List of glaciers in Switzerland
- Swiss Alps
- Navizence
