= Le Toûno =

Mountain in Switzerland

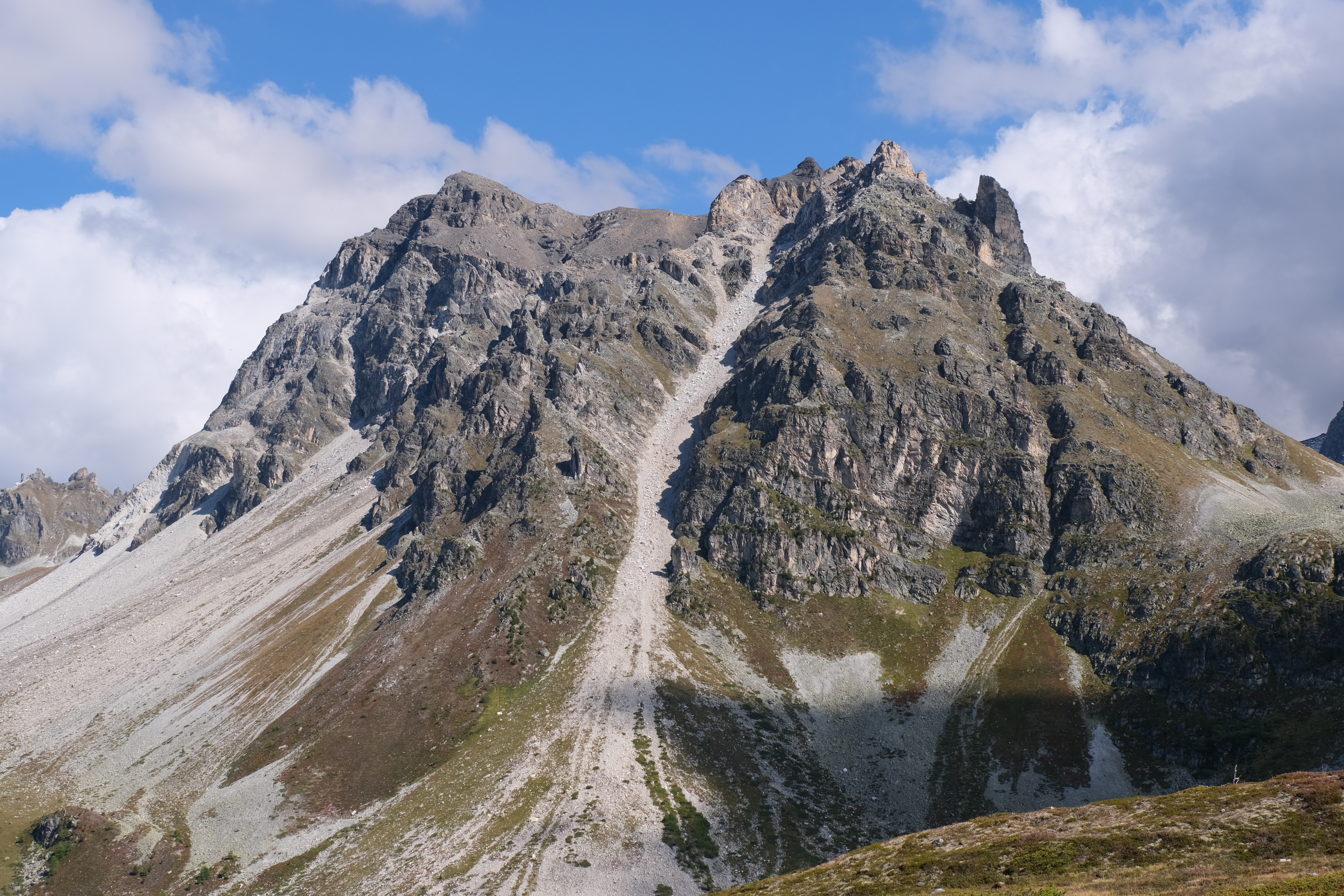
- View from the north side

Highest point
- Elevation: 3,018 m (9,902 ft)
- Prominence: 119 m (390 ft)
- Parent peak: Pointe de Tourtemagne
- Coordinates: 46°12′27″N 7°39′00″E

Geography
- Location within Switzerland
- Location: Valais, Switzerland
- Parent range: Pennine Alps

Le Toûno (3,018 m) is a mountain of the Pennine Alps, overlooking Saint-Luc in the canton of Valais. It lies within the Val d'Anniviers, west of the Pointe de Tourtemagne.

The summit can be accessed via a trail on the south side of the mountain from Saint-Luc.
