= Zmutt Glacier =

Glacier in the Pennine Alps in Valais, Switzerland

- Zmuttgletscher
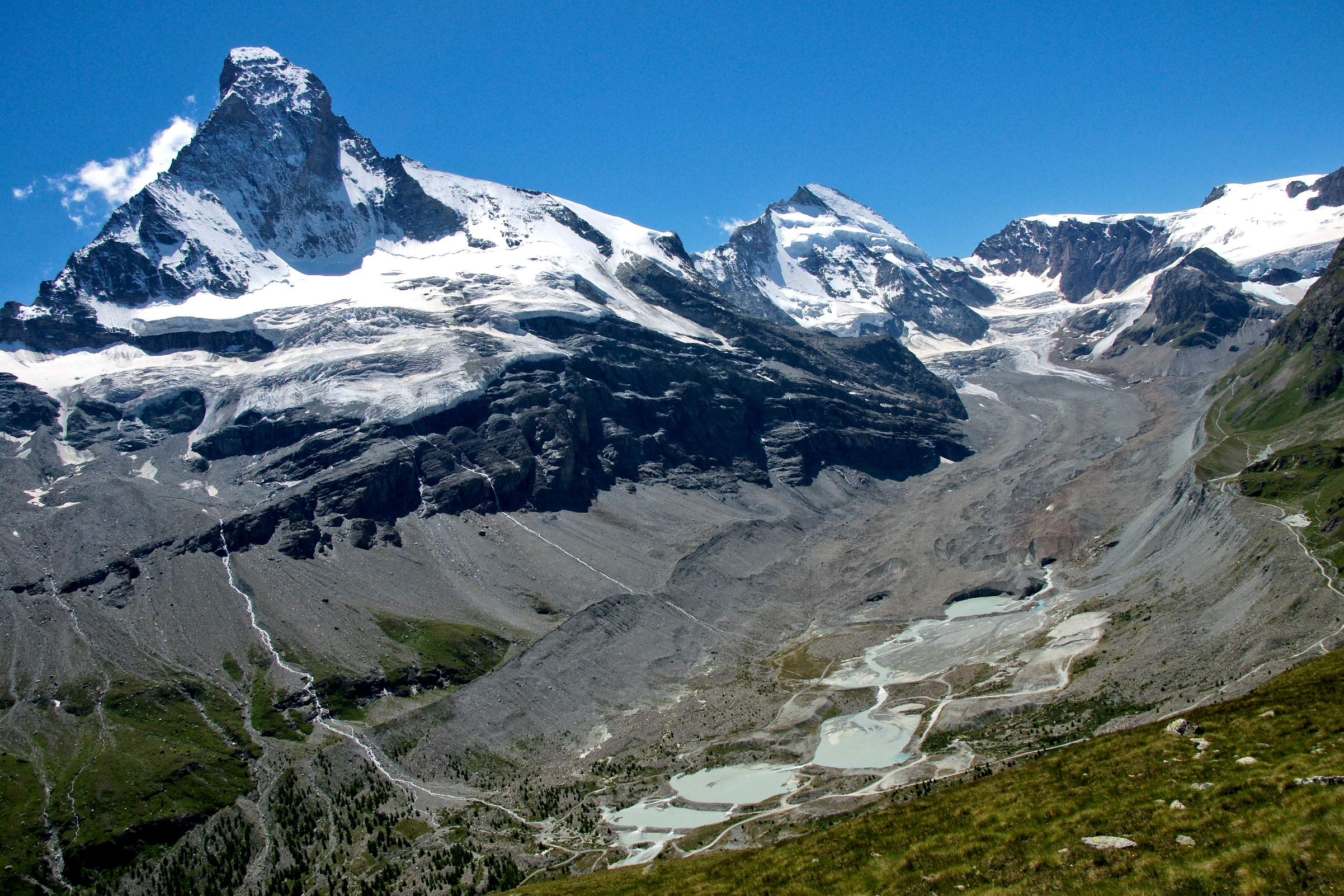
- Zmutt valley with glacier on the right, the left peak is the Matterhorn

- Location within Switzerland Location within Canton of Valais Location within Alps
- Location: Valais, Switzerland
- Coordinates: 45°59′7″N 7°36′57″E
- Length: 6 km (3.7 mi)

The Zmutt Glacier (German: Zmuttgletscher) is a 6 km (3.7 mi) long glacier (2005) situated in the Pennine Alps in the canton of Valais in Switzerland. In 1973 it had an area of 16.89 km^{2} (6.52 sq mi).

Evolution of the Zmutt Glacier. In thick green: cumulated length difference. In thin red: yearly growth in meters

== See also ==
- List of glaciers in Switzerland
- List of glaciers
- Retreat of glaciers since 1850
- Swiss Alps
- Zmutt Valley
