= L'Epaule =

Mountain summit in Switzerland

- Location within Switzerland

Highest point
- Elevation: 4,017 m (13,179 ft)
- Coordinates: 46°04′09.4″N 7°41′14.7″E

Geography
- Location: Switzerland
- Parent range: Pennine Alps

L'Epaule is a minor summit north of the Zinalrothorn. Because of its small prominence it was included in the enlarged list of alpine four-thousanders.
