= Unter Gabelhorn =

Mountain in Switzerland

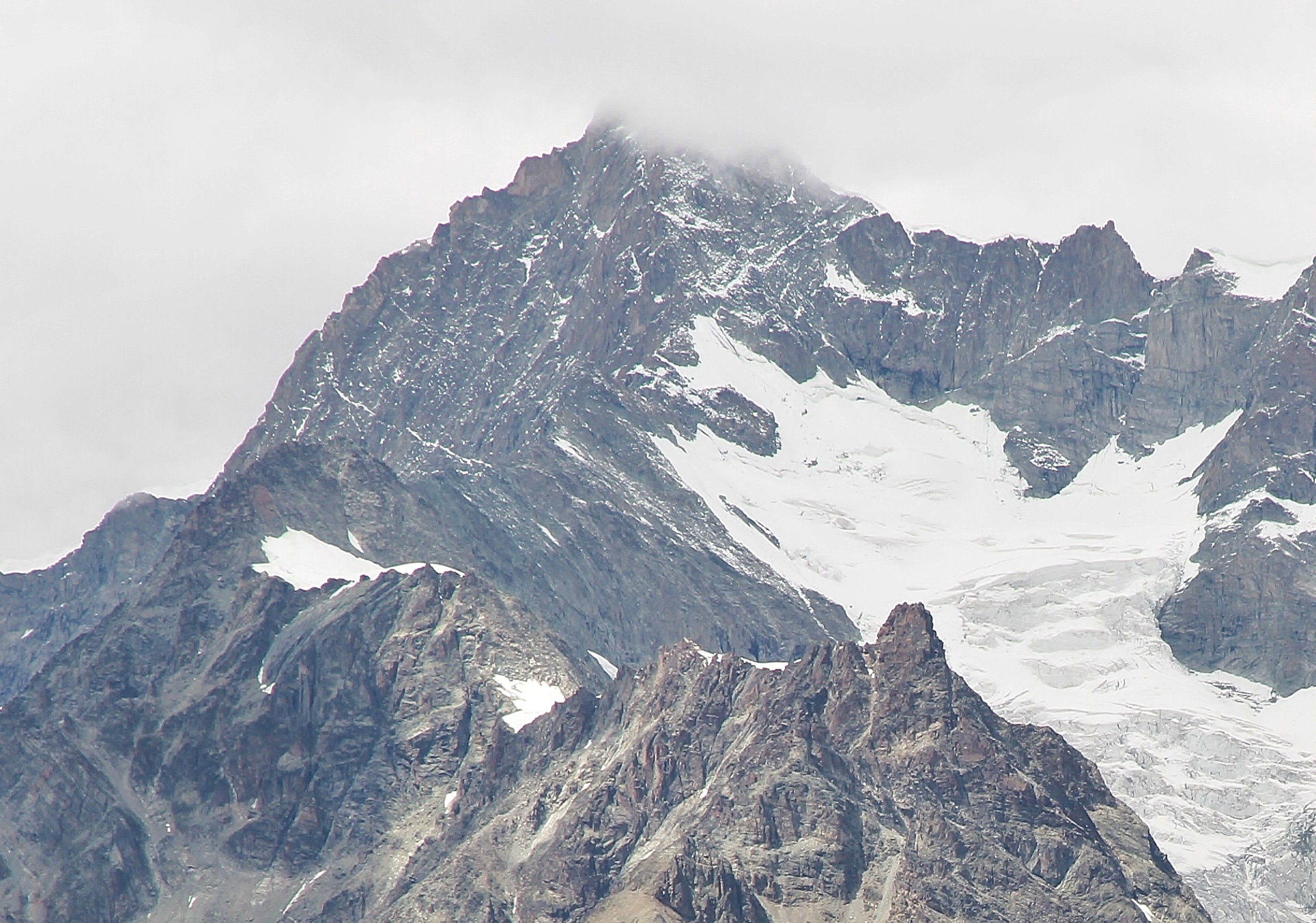
- The Ober Gabelhorn (in the clouds) and the Unter Gabelhorn (lower peak in the foreground)

Highest point
- Elevation: 3,392 m (11,129 ft)
- Prominence: 77 m (253 ft)
- Parent peak: Weisshorn
- Coordinates: 46°1′34.7″N 7°41′50.9″E

Geography
- Location within Switzerland
- Location: Valais, Switzerland
- Parent range: Pennine Alps

The Unter Gabelhorn is a mountain of the Swiss Pennine Alps, located west of Zermatt in the canton of Valais. It lies east of the Ober Gabelhorn, on the chain separating the valley of Trift (north) from the valley of Zmutt (south).

On its northern side, the mountain overlooks the Gabelhorn Glacier.
