= Pointe de Tourtemagne =

Mountain in Switzerland

- Turtmannspitze
- Location within Switzerland

Highest point
- Elevation: 3,080 m (10,100 ft)
- Prominence: 206 m (676 ft)
- Coordinates: 46°12′16.1″N 7°39′41.8″E

Geography
- Location: Valais, Switzerland
- Parent range: Pennine Alps

The Pointe de Tourtemagne (also known as Turtmannspitze) is a mountain of the Swiss Pennine Alps, located east of St. Luc in the canton of Valais. It lies between the valleys of Anniviers and Turtmann.
