= Zmutt =

Swiss village

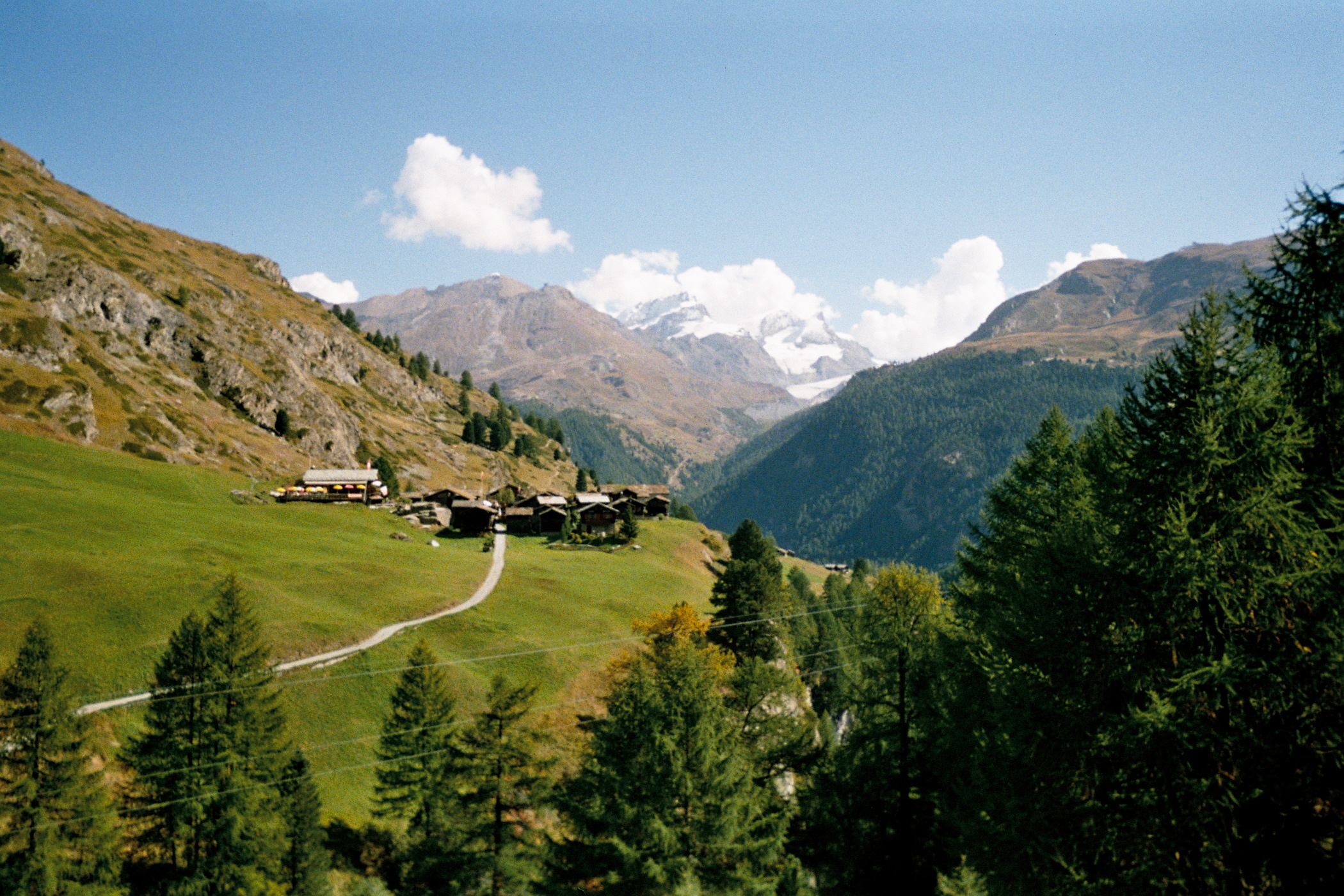
The hamlet of Zmutt

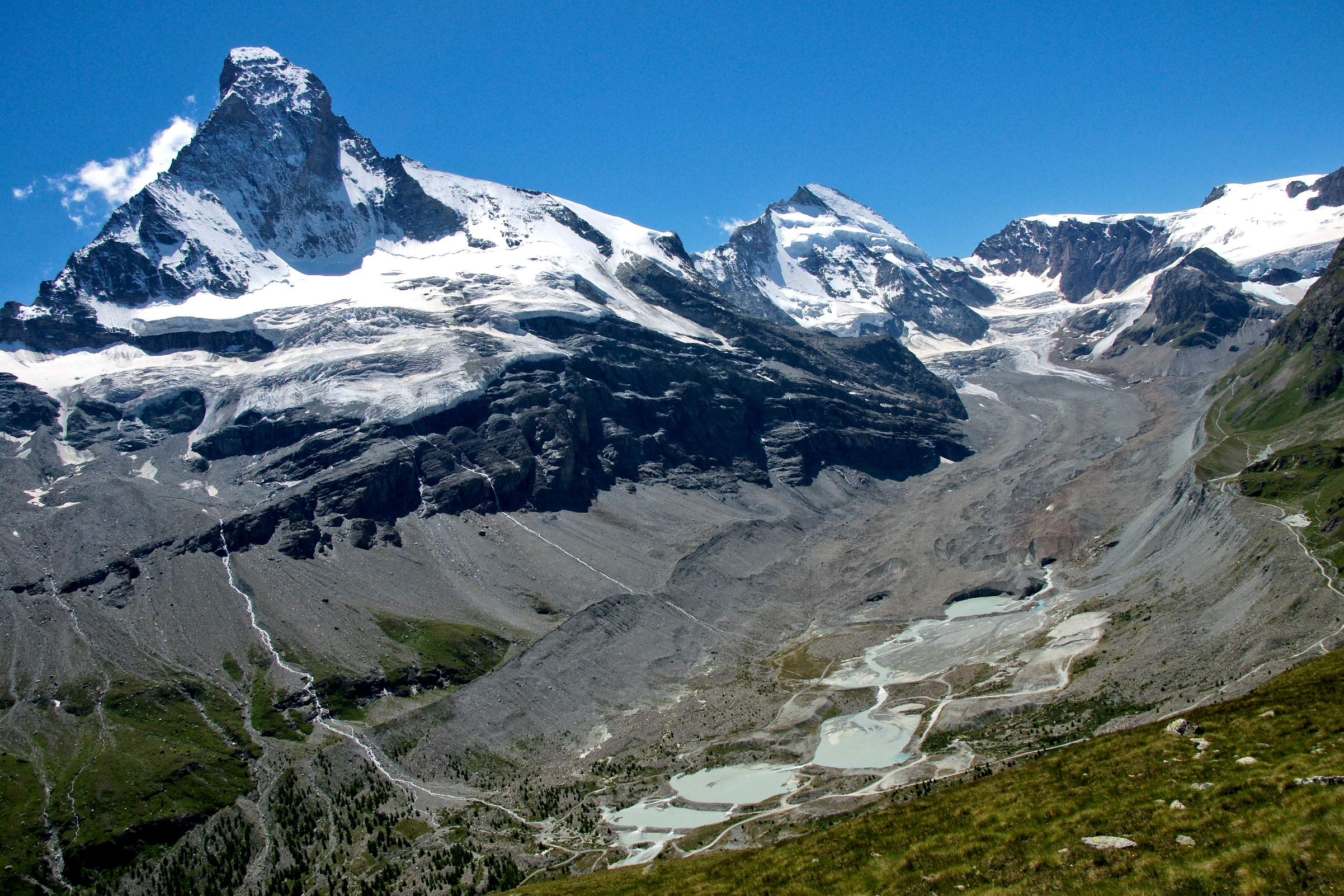
The valley of Zmutt

Zmutt (also spelled Z'mutt, Z'Mutt, Z-Mutt) is a small village in the municipality of Zermatt, Valais, Switzerland, situated at 1936 m in the Zmutt Valley (Zmuttal) west of Zermatt. The village chapel is dedicated to Saint Catherine of Alexandria, patroness of the Valais. The valley passes the northern slope of the Matterhorn and terminates in the Zmutt Glacier on the border to Italy's Aosta Valley. The closest one can possibly get to Zmutt by car (Taxi, in accordance with Zermatt regulations) is by the Z'Mutt Grande Dixence buildings, not the Dam itself. Otherwise, you will have to hike there.

The Zmutt dam at 46°0′28″N 7°42′34″E, constructed in 1964, has a height of 74 m and a capacity of 850'000 m³. This dam is fed by waters from the Zmutt, Bis and Schali Glacier. It is owned by Grande Dixence and serves as a Pumping Station, able to pump 140 million m3 of water every season. It collects water from the Zmuttbach and pumps it to the Trift Tunnel, which branches to the main tunnel. Eventually this water reaches the Lac De Dix, where it is used for electricity generation at the Grande Dixence plant. and a small Hydroelectric Power Plant, capable of a total output of 5 MW. It is in close proximity to the Stafel pumping station. There are 2 cable cars near Zmutt, Chatzler Bodmen and Zmutt Winkelmatten (Zermatt), but these are not for use of the public, and are owned by the Grande Dixence.
