= Pfynwald =

Natural reserve in Switzerland

- Bois de Finges
- Interactive map of Pfynwald
- Coordinates: 46.30360°N 7.59130°E
- Max. elevation: 850 m (2,790 ft)
- Min. elevation: 540 m (1,770 ft)
- Established: 1992
- Website: Pfyn-Finges Nature Park

The Pfynwald or Bois de Finges is a natural reserve and one of the largest continuous Scots pine forests of Europe. It is located on the language border between German- and French-speaking Valais, Switzerland, on the alluvial cone below the Illgraben valley.

The area is protected under federal law since 1992 and harbors one of the last untouched riverine landscapes of Switzerland. On a length of about seven kilometers, the Rhône is allowed to meander freely. The western part of the natural reserve is dominated by prehistoric rock falls, alluvial deposits, and ponds. The forest clearing in the middle of the park contains a manor, with its origins dating back to 1000 AD, and a memorial to the 1799 battle between the French and the revolting Upper Valaisans.

The name of the area derives from one of two Latin terms: ad fines (at the border) or pinus (pine tree).

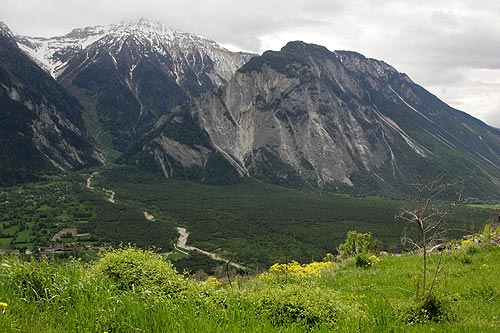
View of the alluvial cone below the Illgraben and the eastern part of the Pfynwald/Bois de Finges

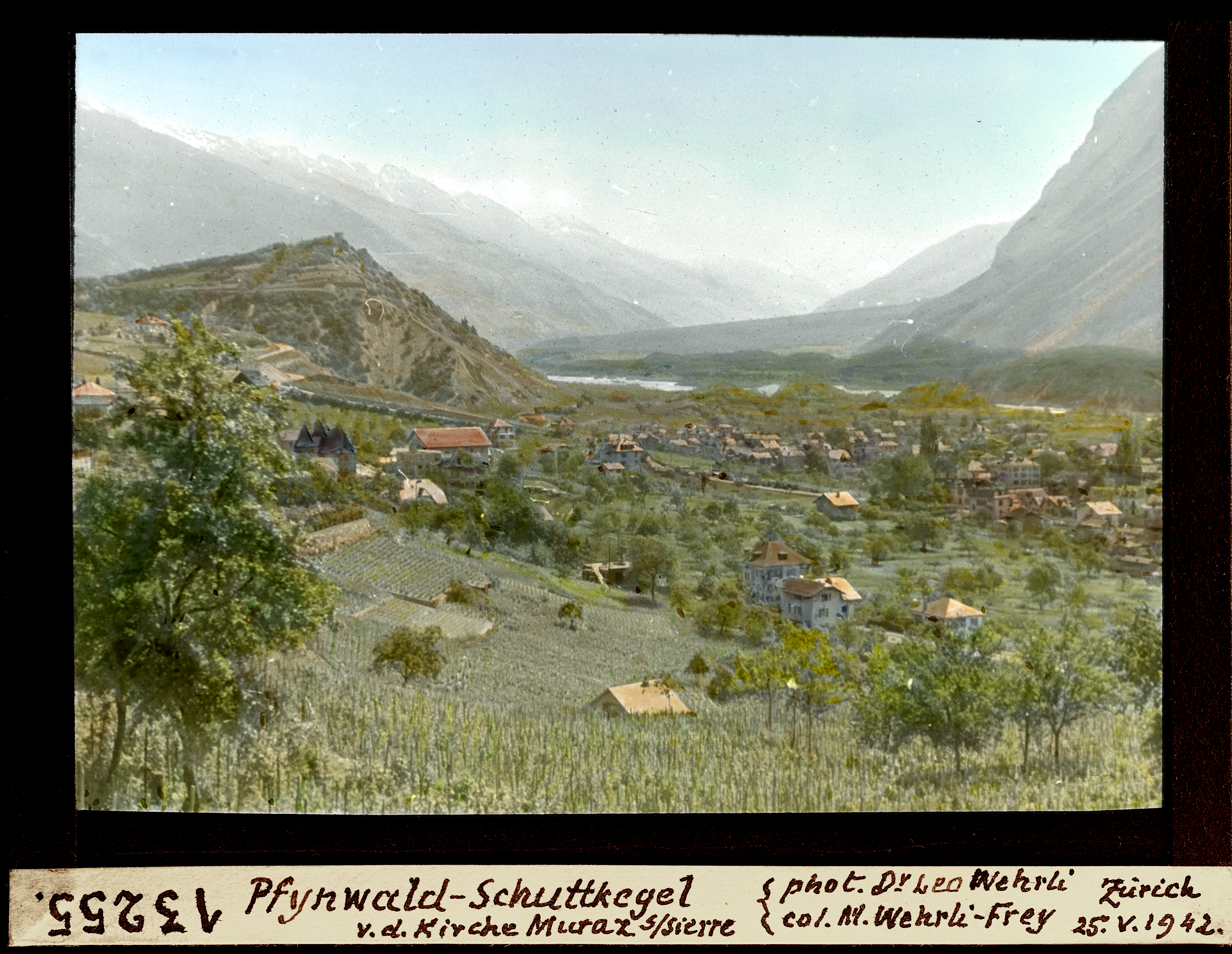
On the right, the western part of the Pfynwald/Bois de Finges. The area is dominated by overgrown rockfall debris. In the background, with its gentle slope, the alluvial cone.
