= Illgraben =

Valley in Valais, Switzerland

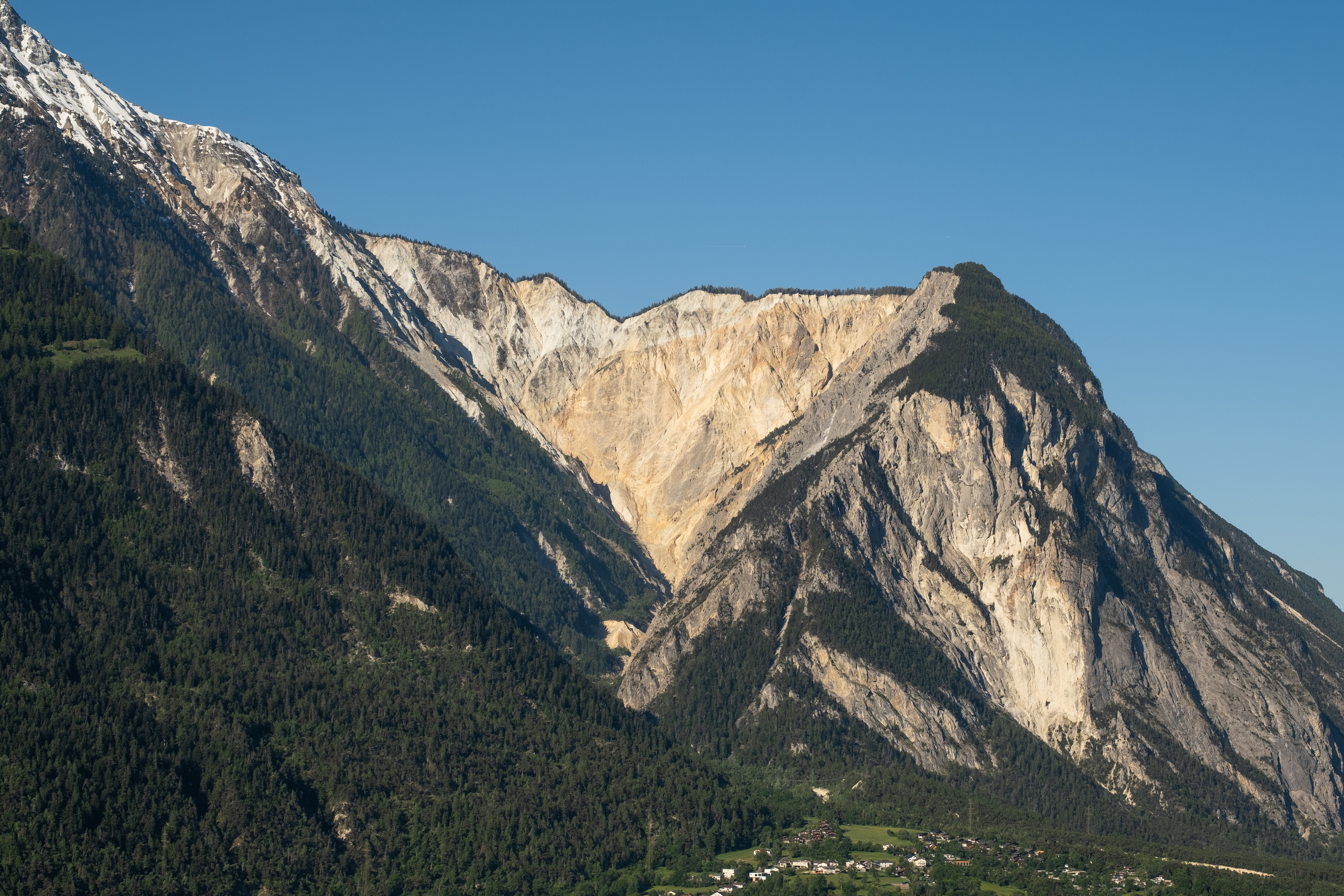
- Illgraben, seen from Lichten
- Floor elevation: 830 m (2,720 ft)
- Length: 4 km (2.5 mi)
- Area: 9 km^{2} (3.5 mi^{2})

Geography
- Country: Switzerland
- State: Valais
- Coordinates: 46.28159°N 7.61419°E
- River: Illbach
- Interactive map of Illgraben

The Illgraben valley is one of the most geologically unstable regions of Switzerland, and is located south of Leuk in the Canton of Valais.

== Geology and geography ==
The valley consists of Triassic dolomite, porous limestone and quartzite, and due to intense weathering, the valley is well known among geologists as a place to study processes like erosion, rockfall, debris and mud flows. Likewise, the Illgraben serves as a laboratory to test mudflow warning systems. The Swiss Federal Institute for Forest, Snow and Landscape Research uses radars, microphones and cameras to register mudflow events, and to warn the population of Leuk. Due to the geology, mudflows occur two to three times a year, while places threatened by mudflows usually experience only one every 30 to 40 years.

Several times a year, the Illgraben's mud flows cause the Rhône river to turn murky until it reaches Lake Geneva, which is 90 kilometers (56 miles) downriver. The Pfynwald (French: bois de Finges or forêt de Finges), a natural reserve and one of the largest continuous Scots pine forests of Europe, is located on the alluvial cone of Illgraben's stream, the Illbach. The Pfynwald itself is an important center for ecological studies.

Less frequently, large rockfalls in the highly unstable catchment provoke debris flows onto the Illgraben fan. In 1961, a failed mass of 3.5 million cubic metres filled the upper ravine, becoming saturated until it collapsed and flowed as far as the Rhone river.

The Illgraben debris fan is one of 16 'alpine megafans' in the Alps, blocking the Rhone valley and creating a climatic, agricultural and linguistic division - French-speaking Valais below, German-speaking Wallis above. Numerous studies have identified successive accumulations during pre-history. However, little is known of the fan's origins: a 'lost mountain' source can be reconstructed above the graben axis, by projecting the Illhorn crest NW to meet the Gorwetschgrat Rhone trough rim. The ~1200 m deep cavity equates to the volume of the fan, suggesting one or a few initiating catastrophic events of 1-200 million cubic metres, during or soon after deglaciation of the Upper Rhone. A similar quarry-like cavity above an outsize debris fan occurs in mirror-image 30 km down the Rhone valley at Volleges Val de Bagnes.

== Tourism ==
A north-easterly view into the Illgraben from its wooded rim is possible from the hiking path on the west side from Chandolin to Plaine Madeleine. From Susten (650 m, part of Leuk), hikers will first encounter the Bhutan bridge, a 134 meter suspension bridge, before seeing the valley's interior. From there, there is an unmarked trail to the Steinschlaghütte (English: rock fall hut), or to the alpine lake Illsee and the Illhorn.

== Literature and further information ==
- Fritz, Angela (5 June 2017). "Each year this 'terrifying' mudslide careens down Switzerland's Illhorn mountain". Washington Post.
- Bennett, G. L.; Molnar, P.; Eisenbeiss, H.; McArdell, B. W. (2012). "Erosional power in the Swiss Alps: characterization of slope failure in the Illgraben". Earth Surface Processes and Landforms. 37 (15): 1627–1640. Bibcode:2012ESPL...37.1627B. doi:10.1002/esp.3263.

Video documents by the Swiss Federal Institute for Forest, Snow and Landscape Research:

- "Spectacular mudslide research site in Valais, Switzerland". YouTube. 5 April 2022. Archived from the original on 17 January 2025. French, with selectable English subtitles.
- "2nd Field trip: Debris Flow monitoring. Illgraben, Valais". YouTube. 31 October 2013. Archived from the original on 17 January 2025. Geologists visiting the Illgraben; explanations spoken in English.
- "Murgang im Illgraben, 28. Juni 2000" [Mud slide in Illgraben, 28 June 2000]. YouTube. 21 March 2016. Archived from the original on 22 April 2024.
