= Illhorn =

Mountain in Switzerland

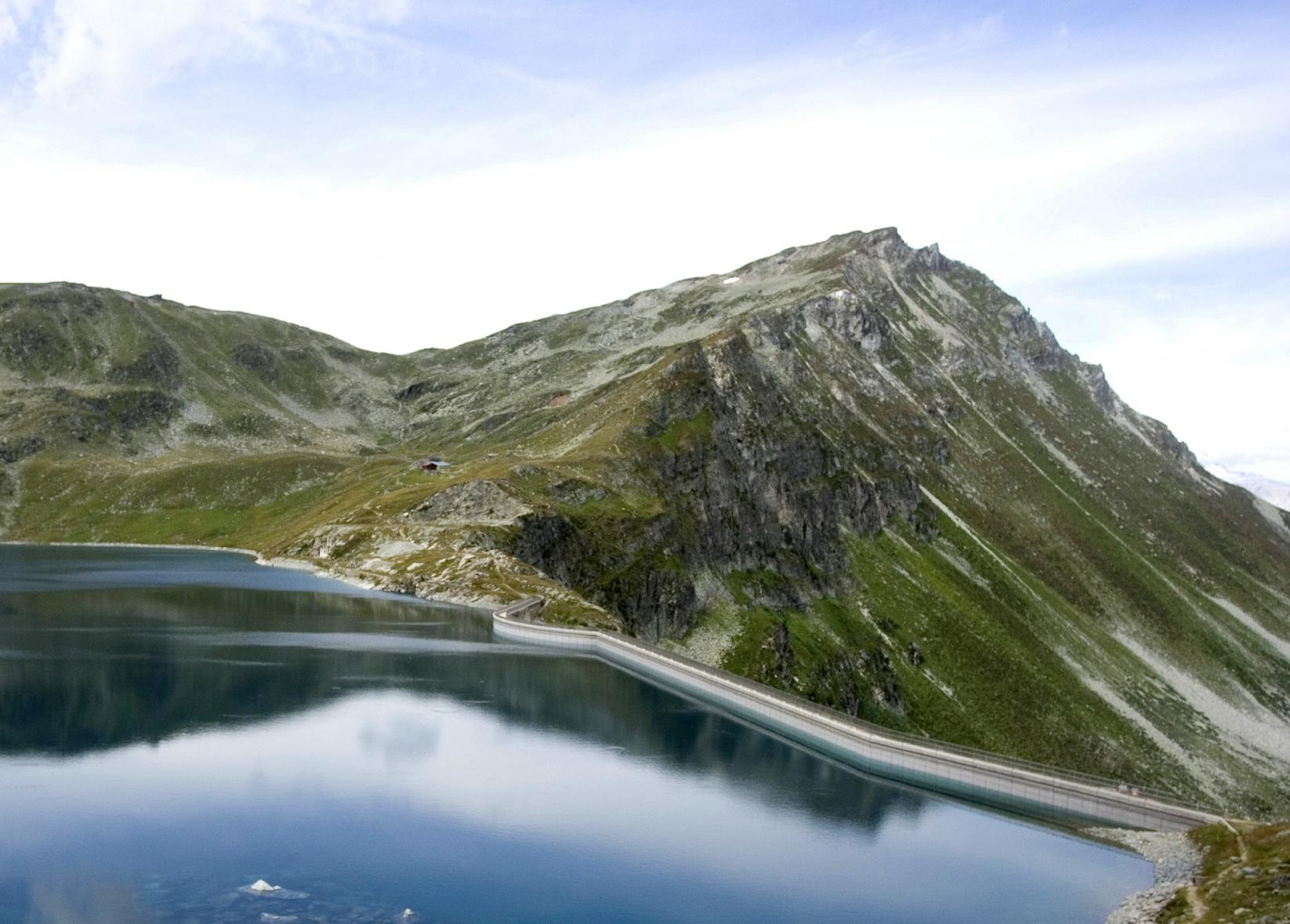
- View from the Illsee (east side)

Highest point
- Elevation: 2,717 m (8,914 ft)
- Prominence: 235 m (771 ft)
- Coordinates: 46°15′45.9″N 7°36′58.4″E

Geography
- Location within Switzerland
- Location: Valais, Switzerland
- Parent range: Pennine Alps

The Illhorn is a mountain of the Swiss Pennine Alps, overlooking Chandolin in the canton of Valais. With a height of 2,717 metres above sea level, it is the highest point of the Illgraben valley.

== Illgraben debris flows ==
The Illgraben catchment extends from the summit of the Illhorn to the Rhone at an elevation of 610m, and experiences debris flows and mud slides several times annually. The largest recorded debris flow in the valley occurred in June 1961, and had a volume of several hundred thousand cubic metres. A warning system gives alert signals 5–15 minutes before the arrival of debris flows at channel crossings. The area is a popular hiking spot and these geomorphological processes are visible most years.

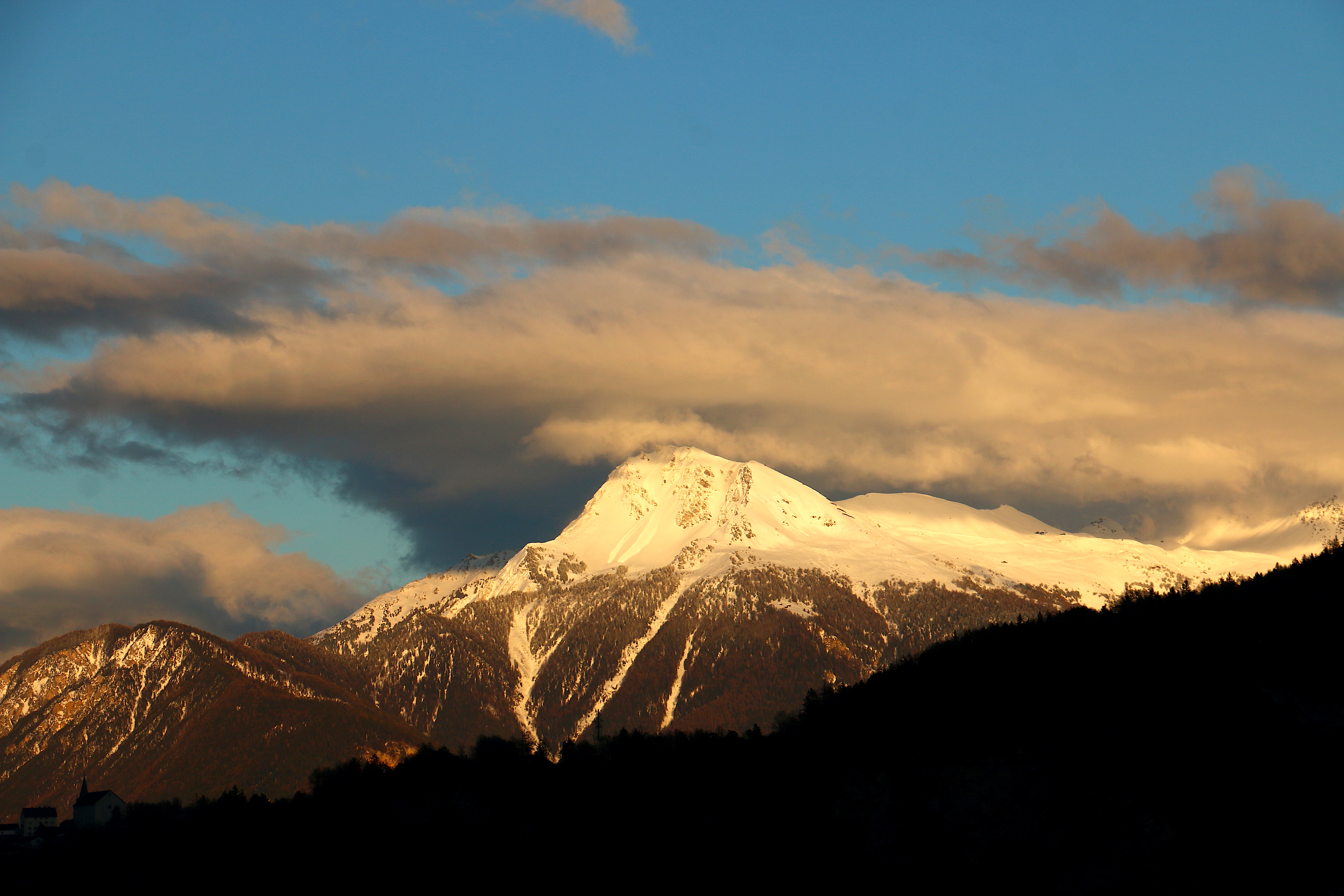
Illhorn seen from west
