= Zinal Glacier =

Glacier in Switzerland

- Glacier de Zinal
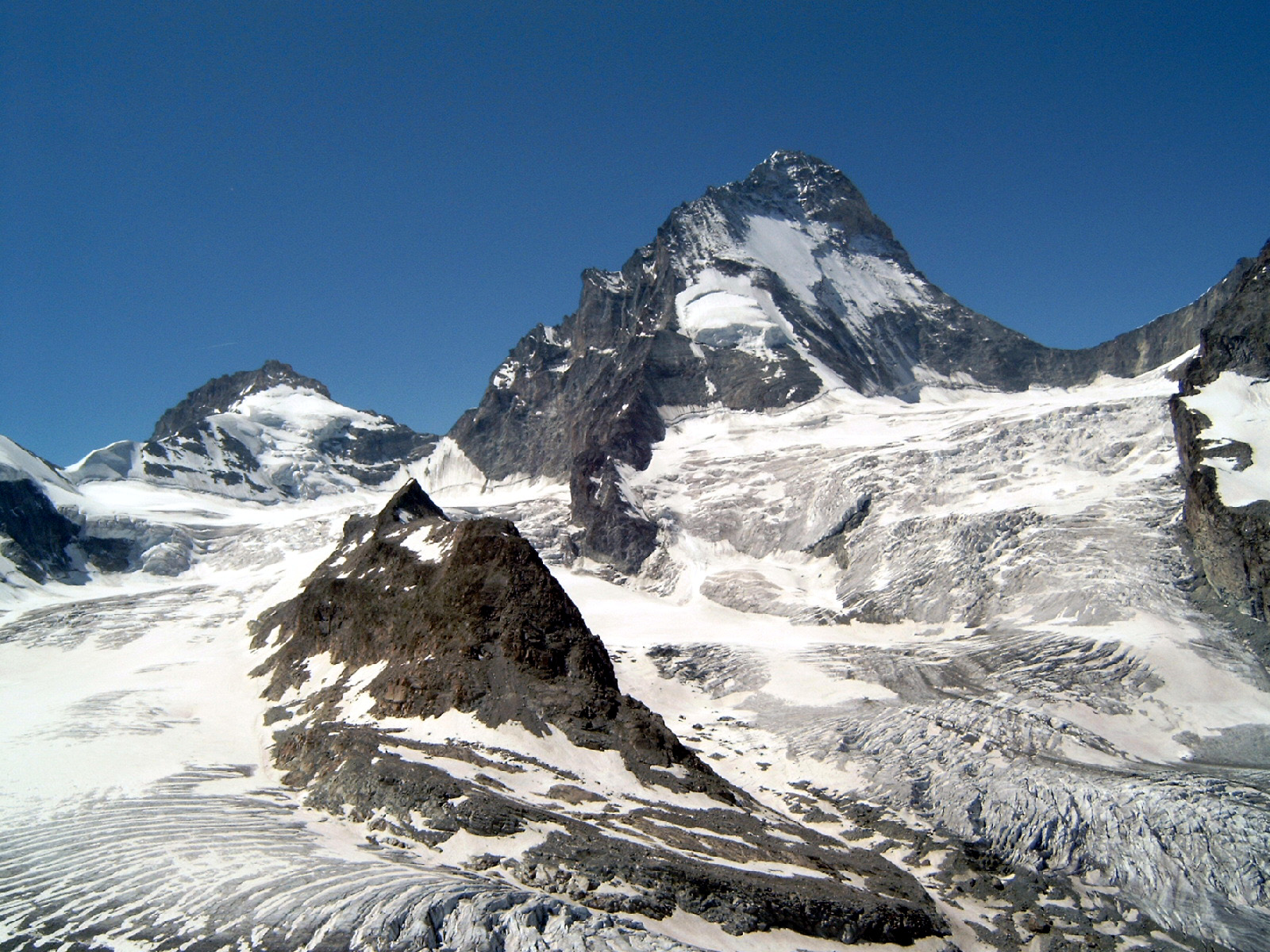
- Glacier de zinal and Dent Blanche

- Location within Switzerland
- Location: Valais, Switzerland
- Coordinates: 46°3′13″N 7°39′7″E
- Length: 7 km (4.3 mi)

The Zinal Glacier (French: Glacier de Zinal) is a 7 km (4.3 mi) long glacier (2005) situated in the Pennine Alps in the canton of Valais in Switzerland. In 1973 it had an area of 15.4 km^{2} (5.9 sq mi). The glacier gives birth to the river Navizence, which runs through a cave.

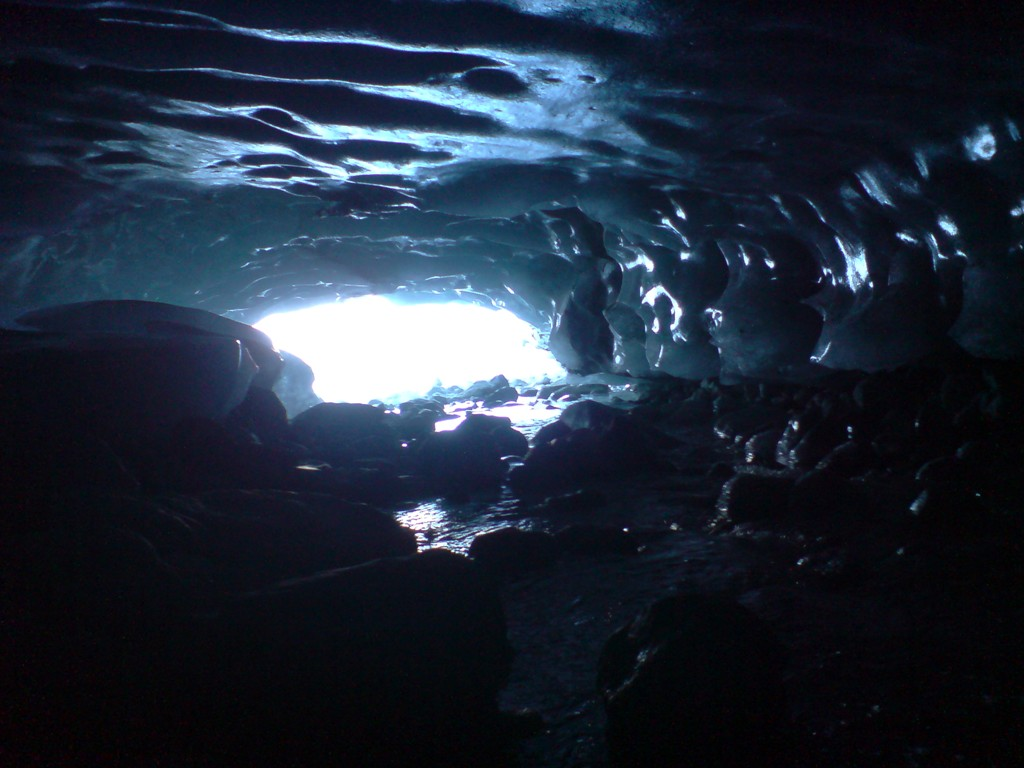
View from inside the glacier

== See also ==
- List of glaciers in Switzerland
- List of glaciers
- Retreat of glaciers since 1850
- Swiss Alps
- Navizence
