= Zinalrothorn =

Mountain in the Pennine Alps

- Aerial view of the Zinalrothorn from the west

Highest point
- Elevation: 4,221 m (13,848 ft)
- Prominence: 491 m (1,611 ft)
- Parent peak: Weisshorn
- Isolation: 4.2 km (2.6 mi)
- Coordinates: 46°3′53″N 7°41′24″E

Geography
- Location within Switzerland
- Zinalrothorn location and nearby peaks and huts Location in Switzerland
- Location: Valais, Switzerland
- Parent range: Pennine Alps

Climbing
- First ascent: 22 August 1864 by Leslie Stephen and Florence Crauford Grove with guides Jakob Anderegg and Melchior Anderegg
- Easiest route: South-east ridge and Gabel notch, AD-, rock and snow climb

The Zinalrothorn at 4,221 m (13,848 ft) is a mountain in the Pennine Alps in Switzerland. Its name comes from the village of Zinal lying on the north side and from the German word Rothorn which means Red Peak. When it was first climbed in 1864 the mountain was known locally as Moming.

== Geography ==
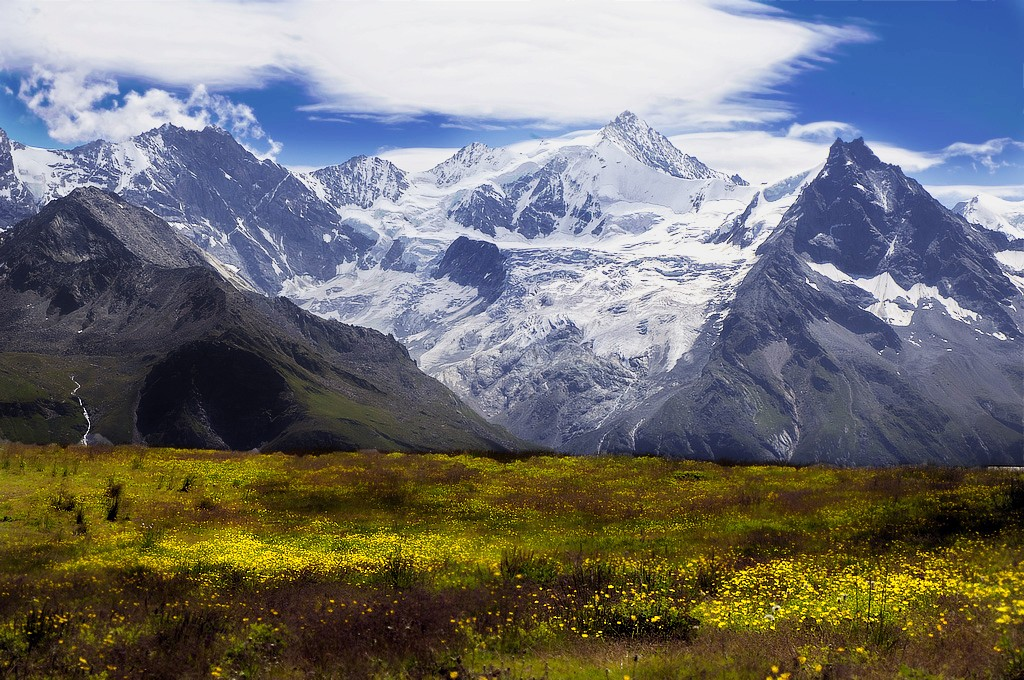
The Zinalrothorn above the Moming Glacier between the Schalihorn (left) and the Besso (right)

The Zinalrothorn is one of the high summits separating the Matter valley on the east and the Val d'Anniviers (or more precisely the Val de Zinal) on the west. The summit of the Weisshorn at 4,505 m (14,780 ft) is located 5 km (3.1 mi) to the north and the Dent Blanche 7 km (4.3 mi) to the west. At the western foot of the mountain lies the large Zinal Glacier and, on the northern side, the Moming Glacier. L'Epaule (the shoulder) is a minor summit lying at the base of the northern ridge.

The villages of Täsch and Zermatt are the closest while Zinal on the north-west is located further away at a distance of 9 km (5.6 mi).

== Climbing history ==
The first ascent was made on 22 August 1864 via the north ridge by Leslie Stephen and Florence Crauford Grove with guides Jakob Anderegg and Melchior Anderegg. They left Zinal at 1 a.m. and ascended the Zinal Glacier. They reached the shoulder from the ridge connecting the Blanc de Moming at the base of the northern ridge at 9 a.m. The traverse of the ridge to the summit took them 2 hours, Stephen wrote later that it was 'the nastiest piece of climbing I have ever accomplished'.

The slightly less difficult normal route, the south-east ridge, was first climbed by the combined parties of Clinton Thomas Dent with guide Alexander Burgener, and George Augustus Passingham, with guides Ferdinand Imseng and Franz Andermatten on 5 September 1872.

The first winter and ski ascent was by Marcel Kurz and T. Theytaz on 7 February 1914.

In the 1880s Mrs Aubrey Le Blond, the first president of the Ladies' Alpine Club, left her detachable skirt by mistake up the Zinalrothorn. To preserve her modesty, she made the decision to climb the mountain a second time to retrieve it rather than return to Zermatt in trousers.

== See also ==
- List of 4000 metre peaks of the Alps

== Bibliography ==
- Dumler, Helmut and Willi P. Burkhardt, The High Mountains of the Alps, London: Diadem, 1994
- Collomb, Robin G., (ed.), Pennine Alps Central, London: Alpine Club, 1975
