= List of highest mountains of Switzerland =

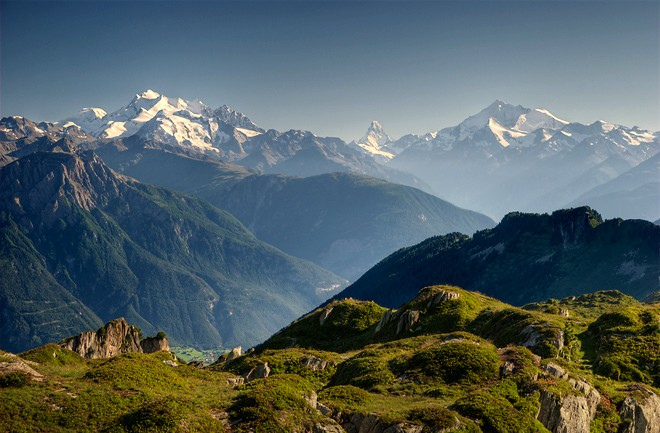
Dom, Matterhorn and Weisshorn

This is a list of the highest mountains of Switzerland. This list only includes summits above 3,600 metres (11,811 ft) with a topographic prominence of at least 30 metres. Note that this list includes many secondary summits that are typically not considered mountains (in the strict sense of the term) but that are mainly of climbing interest. For a list of major summits only, without elevation cut-off, see List of mountains of Switzerland.

The International Climbing and Mountaineering Federation defines a summit in the Alps as independent, if the connecting ridge between it and a higher summit drops at least 30 m (a prominence/drop of 30 m, with the lowest point referred to as the "key col"). There are over 350 such summits exceeding 3,600 m in Switzerland, all located in the High Alps, in five cantons: (Note: Out of 26) Valais, Bern, Graubünden, Uri, and Glarus. All mountain heights and prominences on the list are from the largest-scale maps available.

== Main List ==
Summits with a prominence over 45 metres.

Mountain	Elevation	Prominence	Coordinates	Range	Canton(s)	First ascent
Dufourspitze (Monte Rosa)	4,634 m (15,203 ft)	2,165 m (7,103 ft)	45°56′13″N 07°52′01″E	Pennine Alps	Valais	1855
Nordend (Monte Rosa)	4,608 m (15,118 ft)	89 m (292 ft)	45°56′32″N 07°52′12″E	Pennine Alps	Valais	1861
Zumsteinspitze (Monte Rosa)	4,563 m (14,970 ft)	112 m (367 ft)	45°55′55″N 07°52′17″E	Pennine Alps	Valais	1820
Signalkuppe (Monte Rosa)	4,554 m (14,941 ft)	98 m (322 ft)	45°55′38″N 07°52′37″E	Pennine Alps	Valais	1842
Dom	4,546 m (14,915 ft)	1,047 m (3,435 ft)	46°05′38″N 07°51′32″E	Pennine Alps	Valais	1858
Lyskamm	4,532 m (14,869 ft)	379 m (1,243 ft)	45°55′20″N 07°50′08″E	Pennine Alps	Valais	1861
Weisshorn	4,505 m (14,780 ft)	1,234 m (4,049 ft)	46°06′05″N 07°42′57″E	Pennine Alps	Valais	1861
Täschhorn	4,491 m (14,734 ft)	213 m (699 ft)	46°05′01″N 07°51′26″E	Pennine Alps	Valais	1862
Western Liskamm	4,479 m (14,695 ft)	61 m (200 ft)	45°55′39″N 07°49′19″E	Pennine Alps	Valais	
Matterhorn	4,478 m (14,692 ft)	1,043 m (3,422 ft)	45°58′35″N 07°39′31″E	Pennine Alps	Valais	1865
Parrotspitze (Monte Rosa)	4,434 m (14,547 ft)	134 m (440 ft)	45°55′11″N 07°52′17″E	Pennine Alps	Valais	1863
Dent Blanche	4,357 m (14,295 ft)	916 m (3,005 ft)	46°02′03″N 07°36′43″E	Pennine Alps	Valais	1862
Ludwigshöhe (Monte Rosa)	4,341 m (14,242 ft)	57 m (187 ft)	45°55′02″N 07°51′44″E	Pennine Alps	Valais	
Weisshorn, Grand Gendarme	4,329 m (14,203 ft)	57 m (187 ft)	46°06′26″N 07°42′43″E	Pennine Alps	Valais	
Nadelhorn	4,327 m (14,196 ft)	207 m (679 ft)	46°06′32″N 07°51′51″E	Pennine Alps	Valais	1858
Grand Combin (de Grafeneire)	4,309 m (14,137 ft)	1,512 m (4,961 ft)	45°56′15″N 07°17′57″E	Pennine Alps	Valais	1859
Lenzspitze	4,293 m (14,085 ft)	86 m (282 ft)	46°06′17″N 07°52′06″E	Pennine Alps	Valais	1870
Finsteraarhorn	4,274 m (14,022 ft)	2,279 m (7,477 ft)	46°32′14″N 08°07′34″E	Bernese Alps	Bern/Valais	1829
Castor (Zwillinge)	4,225 m (13,862 ft)	156 m (512 ft)	45°55′20″N 07°47′34″E	Pennine Alps	Valais	1861
Zinalrothorn	4,221 m (13,848 ft)	491 m (1,611 ft)	46°03′54″N 07°41′25″E	Pennine Alps	Valais	1864
Hohberghorn	4,218 m (13,839 ft)	76 m (249 ft)	46°06′46″N 07°51′14″E	Pennine Alps	Valais	1869
Alphubel	4,206 m (13,799 ft)	359 m (1,178 ft)	46°03′47″N 07°51′50″E	Pennine Alps	Valais	1860
Rimpfischhorn	4,199 m (13,776 ft)	647 m (2,123 ft)	46°01′24″N 07°53′03″E	Pennine Alps	Valais	1859
Aletschhorn	4,194 m (13,760 ft)	1,043 m (3,422 ft)	46°27′54″N 07°59′38″E	Bernese Alps	Valais	1859
Strahlhorn	4,190 m (13,750 ft)	404 m (1,325 ft)	46°00′48″N 07°54′06″E	Pennine Alps	Valais	1854
Combin de Valsorey (Grand Combin)	4,184 m (13,727 ft)	57 m (187 ft)	45°56′17″N 07°17′26″E	Pennine Alps	Valais	
Dent d'Hérens	4,173 m (13,691 ft)	704 m (2,310 ft)	45°58′12″N 07°36′19″E	Pennine Alps	Valais	1863
Breithorn (Western Summit)	4,160 m (13,650 ft)	438 m (1,437 ft)	45°56′28″N 07°44′56″E	Pennine Alps	Valais	1813
Jungfrau	4,158 m (13,642 ft)	694 m (2,277 ft)	46°32′12″N 07°57′45″E	Bernese Alps	Bern/Valais	1811
Central Breithorn	4,154 m (13,629 ft)	73 m (240 ft)	45°56′20″N 07°45′23″E	Pennine Alps	Valais	
Bishorn	4,151 m (13,619 ft)	90 m (300 ft)	46°07′04″N 07°42′53″E	Pennine Alps	Valais	1884
Western Breithorn Twin (Eastern Breithorn)	4,138 m (13,576 ft)	120 m (390 ft)	45°56′14″N 07°46′02″E	Pennine Alps	Valais	
Combin de la Tsessette (Grand Combin)	4,132 m (13,556 ft)	57 m (187 ft)	45°56′34″N 07°18′39″E	Pennine Alps	Valais	
Mönch	4,110 m (13,480 ft)	591 m (1,939 ft)	46°33′30″N 07°59′50″E	Bernese Alps	Bern/Valais	1857
Pollux (Zwillinge)	4,089 m (13,415 ft)	243 m (797 ft)	45°55′40″N 07°47′07″E	Pennine Alps	Valais	1864
Schreckhorn	4,078 m (13,379 ft)	795 m (2,608 ft)	46°35′24″N 08°07′05″E	Bernese Alps	Bern	1861
Ober Gabelhorn	4,063 m (13,330 ft)	536 m (1,759 ft)	46°02′19″N 07°40′05″E	Pennine Alps	Valais	1865
Gross Fiescherhorn	4,049 m (13,284 ft)	396 m (1,299 ft)	46°33′05″N 08°03′41″E	Bernese Alps	Bern/Valais	1862
Piz Bernina	4,048 m (13,281 ft)	2,236 m (7,336 ft)	46°22′56″N 09°54′29″E	Bernina Range	Grisons	1850
Gross Grünhorn	4,043 m (13,264 ft)	303 m (994 ft)	46°31′55″N 08°04′40″E	Bernese Alps	Valais	1865
Lauteraarhorn	4,042 m (13,261 ft)	128 m (420 ft)	46°35′02″N 08°07′42″E	Bernese Alps	Bern	1842
Dürrenhorn	4,035 m (13,238 ft)	124 m (407 ft)	46°07′11″N 07°50′53″E	Pennine Alps	Valais	1879
Allalinhorn	4,027 m (13,212 ft)	257 m (843 ft)	46°02′46″N 07°53′41″E	Pennine Alps	Valais	1856
Hinter Fiescherhorn	4,025 m (13,205 ft)	102 m (335 ft)	46°32′47″N 08°04′04″E	Pennine Alps	Valais	
Weissmies	4,013 m (13,166 ft)	1,183 m (3,881 ft)	46°07′40″N 08°00′44″E	Pennine Alps	Valais	1855
Lagginhorn	4,010 m (13,160 ft)	512 m (1,680 ft)	46°09′26″N 08°00′11″E	Pennine Alps	Valais	1856
Piz Zupò	3,995 m (13,107 ft)	414 m (1,358 ft)	46°22′06″N 09°55′53″E	Bernina Range	Grisons	1863
Adlerhorn	3,988 m (13,084 ft)	58 m (190 ft)	46°00′33″N 07°53′21″E	Pennine Alps	Valais	
Fletschhorn	3,985 m (13,074 ft)	300 m (980 ft)	46°10′04″N 08°00′11″E	Pennine Alps	Valais	1854
Gletscherhorn	3,982 m (13,064 ft)	355 m (1,165 ft)	46°30′46″N 07°58′04″E	Bernese Alps	Bern/Valais	1867
Schalihorn	3,975 m (13,041 ft)	225 m (738 ft)	46°05′04″N 07°42′18″E	Pennine Alps	Valais	
Rottalhorn	3,971 m (13,028 ft)	91 m (299 ft)	46°31′55″N 07°58′02″E	Bernese Alps	Bern/Valais	
Piz Scerscen	3,970 m (13,020 ft)	88 m (289 ft)	46°22′42″N 09°54′02″E	Bernina Range	Grisons	1877
Jägerhorn (Monte Rosa)	3,970 m (13,020 ft)	58 m (190 ft)	45°57′08″N 07°52′38″E	Pennine Alps	Valais	
Eiger	3,967 m (13,015 ft)	361 m (1,184 ft)	46°34′39″N 08°00′19″E	Bernese Alps	Bern	1858
Pointe Sud de Moming	3,963 m (13,002 ft)	70 m (230 ft)	46°04′23″N 07°41′43″E	Pennine Alps	Valais	
Grand Cornier	3,962 m (12,999 ft)	431 m (1,414 ft)	46°03′07″N 07°36′41″E	Pennine Alps	Valais	1865
Ebnefluh	3,961 m (12,995 ft)	201 m (659 ft)	46°30′29″N 07°57′11″E	Bernese Alps	Bern/Valais	
Agassizhorn	3,947 m (12,949 ft)	200 m (660 ft)	46°32′48″N 08°06′52″E	Bernese Alps	Bern/Valais	
Piz Argient	3,943 m (12,936 ft)	99 m (325 ft)	46°21′57″N 09°55′31″E	Bernina Range	Grisons	1869
Piz Roseg	3,935 m (12,910 ft)	417 m (1,368 ft)	46°22′25″N 09°52′59″E	Bernina Range	Grisons	1865
Bietschhorn	3,934 m (12,907 ft)	807 m (2,648 ft)	46°23′30″N 07°51′03″E	Bernese Alps	Valais	1859
Trugberg	3,932 m (12,900 ft)	308 m (1,010 ft)	46°32′48″N 08°00′55″E	Bernese Alps	Valais	1871
Ulrichshorn	3,925 m (12,877 ft)	75 m (246 ft)	46°31′54″N 07°58′02″E	Pennine Alps	Valais	
Bellavista	3,921 m (12,864 ft)	81 m (266 ft)	46°22′25″N 09°55′56″E	Bernina Range	Grisons	1868
Piz Roseg, Schneekuppe	3,917 m (12,851 ft)	55 m (180 ft)	46°22′25″N 09°52′59″E	Bernina Range	Grisons	
Klein Grünhorn	3,912 m (12,835 ft)	60 m (200 ft)	46°32′12″N 08°04′26″E	Bernese Alps	Valais	
Gross Wannenhorn	3,906 m (12,815 ft)	636 m (2,087 ft)	46°29′38″N 08°05′49″E	Bernese Alps	Valais	1864
Piz Palü	3,899 m (12,792 ft)	223 m (732 ft)	46°22′42″N 09°57′38″E	Bernina Range	Grisons	1866
Aiguille d'Argentière	3,898 m (12,789 ft)	473 m (1,552 ft)	45°57′36″N 07°01′12″E	Mont Blanc massif	Valais	1864
Wellenkuppe	3,898 m (12,789 ft)	94 m (308 ft)	46°02′31″N 07°40′40″E	Pennine Alps	Valais	
Gobba di Rollin	3,898 m (12,789 ft)	88 m (289 ft)	45°55′27″N 07°44′04″E	Pennine Alps	Valais	
Klein Fiescherhorn	3,895 m (12,779 ft)	76 m (249 ft)	46°33′20″N 08°04′32″E	Bernese Alps	Bern/Valais	
Mittaghorn	3,893 m (12,772 ft)	197 m (646 ft)	46°29′54″N 07°55′47″E	Bernese Alps	Bern/Valais	
Feechopf	3,887 m (12,753 ft)	79 m (259 ft)	46°02′59″N 07°52′58″E	Pennine Alps	Valais	
Klein Matterhorn	3,883 m (12,740 ft)	88 m (289 ft)	45°56′18″N 07°43′47″E	Pennine Alps	Valais	1789
Aiguille d'Argentière, Flèche Rousse	3,878 m (12,723 ft)	50 m (160 ft)	45°57′36″N 07°01′12″E	Mont Blanc massif	Valais	
Fiescher Gabelhorn	3,876 m (12,717 ft)	152 m (499 ft)	46°30′08″N 08°05′03″E	Bernese Alps	Valais	
Ruinette	3,875 m (12,713 ft)	860 m (2,820 ft)	45°58′45″N 07°24′01″E	Pennine Alps	Valais	1865
Crast' Agüzza	3,870 m (12,700 ft)	179 m (587 ft)	46°22′50″N 09°54′25″E	Bernina Range	Grisons	1865
Mont Blanc de Cheilon	3,870 m (12,700 ft)	174 m (571 ft)	45°59′35″N 07°25′02″E	Pennine Alps	Valais	1865
Chamm	3,865 m (12,680 ft)	101 m (331 ft)	46°30′06″N 08°04′45″E	Bernese Alps	Valais	
Pointe Nord de Moming	3,863 m (12,674 ft)	86 m (282 ft)	46°04′40″N 07°42′00″E	Pennine Alps	Valais	
Grünegghorn	3,863 m (12,674 ft)	72 m (236 ft)	46°31′35″N 08°04′25″E	Bernese Alps	Valais	
Schönbühlhorn	3,854 m (12,644 ft)	92 m (302 ft)	46°29′53″N 08°05′28″E	Bernese Alps	Valais	
Dent d'Hérens, Punta Carrel	3,841 m (12,602 ft)	50 m (160 ft)	45°58′17″N 07°36′56″E	Pennine Alps	Valais	
Bouquetins	3,838 m (12,592 ft)	490 m (1,610 ft)	45°58′56″N 07°32′43″E	Pennine Alps	Valais	1871
Tour Noir	3,837 m (12,589 ft)	302 m (991 ft)	45°56′56″N 07°02′15″E	Mont Blanc massif	Valais	1876
Tour de Boussine	3,833 m (12,575 ft)	97 m (318 ft)	45°56′11″N 07°19′26″E	Pennine Alps	Valais	
Brunegghorn	3,831 m (12,569 ft)	304 m (997 ft)	46°07′33″N 07°44′45″E	Pennine Alps	Valais	
Mont Blanc de Cheilon, Southwest-Top	3,827 m (12,556 ft)	51 m (167 ft)	45°59′35″N 07°25′02″E	Pennine Alps	Valais	
Nesthorn	3,820 m (12,530 ft)	658 m (2,159 ft)	46°24′48″N 07°55′34″E	Bernese Alps	Valais	1865
Mont Dolent	3,820 m (12,530 ft)	330 m (1,080 ft)	45°55′21″N 07°02′46″E	Mont Blanc massif	Valais	1864
Dreieckhorn	3,811 m (12,503 ft)	192 m (630 ft)	46°28′41″N 08°01′12″E	Bernese Alps	Valais	
Tête de Valpelline	3,799 m (12,464 ft)	239 m (784 ft)	45°58′31″N 07°34′52″E	Pennine Alps	Valais	
Schinhorn	3,796 m (12,454 ft)	422 m (1,385 ft)	46°27′06″N 07°56′48″E	Bernese Alps	Valais	1869
Balfrin	3,796 m (12,454 ft)	243 m (797 ft)	46°08′06″N 07°52′49″E	Pennine Alps	Valais	
Fluchthorn	3,795 m (12,451 ft)	71 m (233 ft)	46°01′17″N 07°54′52″E	Pennine Alps	Valais	
Cima di Jazzi	3,792 m (12,441 ft)	241 m (791 ft)	45°58′52″N 07°53′41″E	Pennine Alps	Valais	
Pointe de Zinal	3,789 m (12,431 ft)	301 m (988 ft)	46°01′37″N 07°37′50″E	Pennine Alps	Valais	1870
La Serpentine	3,789 m (12,431 ft)	247 m (810 ft)	45°59′04″N 07°26′00″E	Pennine Alps	Valais	
Pigne d'Arolla	3,787 m (12,425 ft)	154 m (505 ft)	45°59′28″N 07°27′18″E	Pennine Alps	Valais	1865
Breithorn (Blatten)	3,785 m (12,418 ft)	282 m (925 ft)	46°26′08″N 07°53′38″E	Bernese Alps	Valais	
Balfrin, Northwest-Top	3,782 m (12,408 ft)	60 m (200 ft)	46°08′06″N 07°52′49″E	Pennine Alps	Valais	
Breithorn (Lauterbrunnen)	3,780 m (12,400 ft)	464 m (1,522 ft)	46°28′43″N 07°52′36″E	Bernese Alps	Bern/Valais	1865
Bouquetins, North-Top	3,779 m (12,398 ft)	108 m (354 ft)	45°58′56″N 07°32′43″E	Pennine Alps	Valais	
Louwihorn	3,776 m (12,388 ft)	66 m (217 ft)	46°31′37″N 07°58′09″E	Bernese Alps	Bern/Valais	
Grosshorn	3,754 m (12,316 ft)	194 m (636 ft)	46°29′12″N 07°54′39″E	Bernese Alps	Bern/Valais	
Aiguille de l'A Neuve	3,753 m (12,313 ft)	63 m (207 ft)	45°57′11″N 07°02′10″E	Mont Blanc massif	Valais	
Fieschergrat	3,752 m (12,310 ft)	56 m (184 ft)	46°33′05″N 08°05′18″E	Bernese Alps	Bern/Valais	
Piz Morteratsch	3,751 m (12,306 ft)	324 m (1,063 ft)	46°24′10″N 09°54′06″E	Bernina Range	Grisons	1858
Kinhorn	3,750 m (12,300 ft)	105 m (344 ft)	46°04′38″N 07°50′02″E	Pennine Alps	Valais	
Bouquetins, Northern Intermediate-Top	3,749 m (12,300 ft)	52 m (171 ft)	45°58′56″N 07°32′43″E	Pennine Alps	Valais	
Kleines Aletschhorn	3,745 m (12,287 ft)	52 m (171 ft)	46°28′03″N 07°58′38″E	Bernese Alps	Valais	
Sattelhorn	3,744 m (12,283 ft)	126 m (413 ft)	46°28′06″N 07°57′56″E	Bernese Alps	Valais	1883
Kranzberg North-Top	3,741 m (12,274 ft)	83 m (272 ft)	46°31′20″N 07°58′52″E	Bernese Alps	Valais	
Geisshorn	3,740 m (12,270 ft)	158 m (518 ft)	46°26′28″N 08°00′21″E	Bernese Alps	Valais	
Hohgwächte	3,740 m (12,270 ft)	82 m (269 ft)	46°06′14″N 07°50′27″E	Pennine Alps	Valais	
Klein Lauteraarhorn	3,738 m (12,264 ft)	117 m (384 ft)	46°34′44″N 08°08′21″E	Bernese Alps	Bern	
Trifthorn	3,728 m (12,231 ft)	70 m (230 ft)	46°03′06″N 07°40′42″E	Pennine Alps	Valais	
Mont Vélan	3,726 m (12,224 ft)	620 m (2,030 ft)	45°53′30″N 07°15′06″E	Pennine Alps	Valais	1779
Sattelhorn (Geisshorn Northeast-Top)	3,724 m (12,218 ft)	48 m (157 ft)	46°26′28″N 08°00′21″E	Bernese Alps	Valais	
L'Evêque	3,716 m (12,192 ft)	647 m (2,123 ft)	45°57′52″N 07°30′10″E	Pennine Alps	Valais	1867
Combin de Corbassière	3,716 m (12,192 ft)	312 m (1,024 ft)	45°58′41″N 07°16′50″E	Pennine Alps	Valais	1851
Distlighorn	3,716 m (12,192 ft)	49 m (161 ft)	46°27′06″N 07°56′48″E	Bernese Alps	Valais	
Testa del Leone	3,715 m (12,188 ft)	135 m (443 ft)	45°58′16″N 07°38′36″E	Pennine Alps	Valais	
La Singla	3,714 m (12,185 ft)	452 m (1,483 ft)	45°56′45″N 07°28′19″E	Pennine Alps	Valais	1867
Mont Durand/Arbenhorn	3,713 m (12,182 ft)	169 m (554 ft)	46°02′02″N 07°39′02″E	Pennine Alps	Valais	
Anungrat	3,713 m (12,182 ft)	89 m (292 ft)	46°29′06″N 07°56′23″E	Bernese Alps	Valais	
Tête Blanche	3,710 m (12,170 ft)	159 m (522 ft)	45°59′15″N 07°34′30″E	Pennine Alps	Valais	
Pointe Centrale du Brenay	3,710 m (12,170 ft)	80 m (260 ft)	45°58′28″N 07°26′50″E	Pennine Alps	Valais	
Le Pleureur	3,704 m (12,152 ft)	467 m (1,532 ft)	46°00′59″N 07°22′09″E	Pennine Alps	Valais	1867
Silberhorn	3,704 m (12,152 ft)	67 m (220 ft)	46°32′32″N 07°56′56″E	Bernese Alps	Bern	1863
Dent d'Hérens, Punta Maria Cristina	3,703 m (12,149 ft)	71 m (233 ft)	45°58′20″N 07°37′13″E	Pennine Alps	Valais	
Mittelhorn (Wetterhörner)	3,702 m (12,146 ft)	578 m (1,896 ft)	46°38′07″N 08°07′29″E	Bernese Alps	Bern	1845
Tournelon Blanc	3,700 m (12,100 ft)	159 m (522 ft)	45°58′11″N 07°19′20″E	Pennine Alps	Valais	
Rotstock	3,699 m (12,136 ft)	118 m (387 ft)	46°26′07″N 08°00′07″E	Bernese Alps	Valais	
Balmhorn	3,697 m (12,129 ft)	1,020 m (3,350 ft)	46°25′30″N 07°41′37″E	Bernese Alps	Bern/Valais	1864
Mulets de la Tsessette	3,695 m (12,123 ft)	53 m (174 ft)	45°57′14″N 07°18′42″E	Pennine Alps	Valais	
Walcherhorn	3,692 m (12,113 ft)	88 m (289 ft)	46°33′36″N 08°02′06″E	Bernese Alps	Bern/Valais	
Wetterhorn	3,690 m (12,110 ft)	211 m (692 ft)	46°38′20″N 08°06′56″E	Bernese Alps	Bern	1844
Rosenhorn (Wetterhörner)	3,689 m (12,103 ft)	193 m (633 ft)	46°37′55″N 08°08′14″E	Bernese Alps	Bern	
Mittler Gabelhorn	3,685 m (12,090 ft)	91 m (299 ft)	46°02′00″N 07°40′36″E	Pennine Alps	Valais	
Grande Aiguille (Les Maisons Blanches)	3,682 m (12,080 ft)	223 m (732 ft)	45°57′01″N 07°15′53″E	Pennine Alps	Valais	
Aiguille du Chardonnet pt 3680 (Note: The main-summit of the Aiguille du Chardonnet lies beyond the border to France and has a height of 3824 m and a prominence of 503 m.)	3,680 m (12,070 ft)	———	45°58′09″N 07°00′33″E	Mont Blanc massif	Valais	
Aiguilles Rouges du Dolent: Pointe Kurz	3,677 m (12,064 ft)	169 m (554 ft)	45°56′18″N 07°02′08″E	Mont Blanc massif	Valais	
Dent de Perroc	3,676 m (12,060 ft)	408 m (1,339 ft)	46°02′22″N 07°31′23″E	Pennine Alps	Valais	1871
Pointe des Genevois	3,674 m (12,054 ft)	54 m (177 ft)	46°02′12″N 07°31′33″E	Pennine Alps	Valais	
Tête de Chavannes	3,672 m (12,047 ft)	76 m (249 ft)	45°59′11″N 07°33′53″E	Pennine Alps	Valais	
Besso	3,669 m (12,037 ft)	151 m (495 ft)	46°04′39″N 07°39′32″E	Pennine Alps	Valais	1862
Aiguille de la Tsa	3,668 m (12,034 ft)	251 m (823 ft)	46°01′17″N 07°31′20″E	Pennine Alps	Valais	
Ober Äschhorn	3,668 m (12,034 ft)	47 m (154 ft)	46°03′38″N 07°42′28″E	Pennine Alps	Valais	
Grosses Fillarhorn	3,667 m (12,031 ft)	106 m (348 ft)	45°57′50″N 07°52′52″E	Pennine Alps	Valais	
Kranzberg South-Top	3,666 m (12,028 ft)	130 m (430 ft)	46°30′52″N 07°59′28″E	Bernese Alps	Bern	
Combin de Boveire	3,663 m (12,018 ft)	173 m (568 ft)	45°57′53″N 07°16′15″E	Pennine Alps	Valais	
Petit Combin	3,663 m (12,018 ft)	113 m (371 ft)	45°59′07″N 07°16′06″E	Pennine Alps	Valais	
Pointes des Douves Blanches	3,663 m (12,018 ft)	70 m (230 ft)	46°01′17″N 07°31′20″E	Pennine Alps	Valais	
Blanc de Moming	3,661 m (12,011 ft)	79 m (259 ft)	46°04′25″N 07°39′52″E	Pennine Alps	Valais	
Blüemlisalp(horn)	3,660 m (12,010 ft)	896 m (2,940 ft)	46°29′20″N 07°46′21″E	Bernese Alps	Bern	1860
Pointe de Bricola	3,658 m (12,001 ft)	68 m (223 ft)	46°03′45″N 07°35′30″E	Pennine Alps	Valais	
Schinhorn, Southwest-Top	3,657 m (11,998 ft)	50 m (160 ft)	46°27′06″N 07°56′48″E	Bernese Alps	Valais	
Bärglistock	3,655 m (11,991 ft)	223 m (732 ft)	46°36′56″N 08°08′27″E	Bernese Alps	Bern	
Portjengrat (Pizzo d'Andolla)	3,654 m (11,988 ft)	411 m (1,348 ft)	46°06′03″N 08°02′05″E	Pennine Alps	Valais	1871
Mitre de l'Evêque	3,653 m (11,985 ft)	133 m (436 ft)	45°58′07″N 07°30′23″E	Pennine Alps	Valais	
Breitlauihorn	3,654 m (11,988 ft)	87 m (285 ft)	46°24′46″N 07°52′51″E	Bernese Alps	Bern	
Kleines Breithorn	3,654 m (11,988 ft)	85 m (279 ft)	46°28′43″N 07°52′36″E	Bernese Alps	Bern	
Wyssi Frau (Blüemlisalp)	3,648 m (11,969 ft)	120 m (390 ft)	46°29′35″N 07°47′0″E	Bernese Alps	Bern	
Hugihorn	3,647 m (11,965 ft)	82 m (269 ft)	46°34′22″N 08°08′49″E	Bernese Alps	Bern	
Gredetschhorli	3,646 m (11,962 ft)	120 m (390 ft)	46°24′42″N 07°54′35″E	Bernese Alps	Valais	
La Sâle	3,646 m (11,962 ft)	112 m (367 ft)	46°01′25″N 07°22′19″E	Pennine Alps	Valais	
Aiguilles Rouges d'Arolla	3,644 m (11,955 ft)	789 m (2,589 ft)	46°03′19″N 07°26′01″E	Pennine Alps	Valais	1870
Aiguilles du Meitin (Les Maisons Blanches)	3,641 m (11,946 ft)	108 m (354 ft)	45°57′20″N 07°15′47″E	Pennine Alps	Valais	
Aiguille d'Argentière, Eastsoutheast-Ridge-Gendarme	3,641 m (11,946 ft)	50 m (160 ft)	45°57′36″N 07°01′12″E	Mont Blanc massif	Valais	
Neue Weisstorspitze	3,639 m (11,939 ft)	100 m (330 ft)	45°59′33″N 07°54′22″E	Pennine Alps	Valais	
Aiguilles de Boveire	3,639 m (11,939 ft)	90 m (300 ft)	45°58′24″N 07°16′13″E	Pennine Alps	Valais	
Doldenhorn	3,638 m (11,936 ft)	655 m (2,149 ft)	46°28′08″N 07°44′05″E	Bernese Alps	Bern	1862
Mont Collon	3,637 m (11,932 ft)	208 m (682 ft)	45°58′35″N 07°30′17″E	Pennine Alps	Valais	1867
Studerhorn	3,632 m (11,916 ft)	230 m (750 ft)	46°31′58″N 08°08′52″E	Bernese Alps	Bern/Valais	
Oberaarhorn	3,631 m (11,913 ft)	260 m (850 ft)	46°31′53″N 08°10′28″E	Bernese Alps	Bern/Valais	
Dammastock	3,630 m (11,910 ft)	1,466 m (4,810 ft)	46°38′36″N 08°25′16″E	Uri Alps	Uri/Valais	1864
Altels	3,630 m (11,910 ft)	100 m (330 ft)	46°25′44″N 07°40′42″E	Bernese Alps	Bern/Valais	
Aiguilles de Boveire, South-Top	3,630 m (11,910 ft)	60 m (200 ft)	45°58′14″N 07°16′18″E	Pennine Alps	Valais	
Gross Fusshorn	3,627 m (11,900 ft)	122 m (400 ft)	46°25′49″N 07°59′53″E	Bernese Alps	Valais	
Torre di Castelfranco pt 3625 (Note: The highest point of the Torre di Castelfranco lies beyond the border to Italy and has a height of 3629 m and a prominence of 53 m.)	3,625 m (11,893 ft)	———	45°58′28″N 07°52′40″E	Pennine Alps	Valais	
Tournelon Blanc, South-Top	3,624 m (11,890 ft)	47 m (154 ft)	45°58′11″N 07°19′20″E	Pennine Alps	Valais	
Unnerbächhorn, Northwest(Main)-Top	3,620 m (11,880 ft)	82 m (269 ft)	46°24′35″N 07°56′02″E	Bernese Alps	Valais	
Unter Äschhorn	3,618 m (11,870 ft)	68 m (223 ft)	46°03′29″N 07°42′53″E	Pennine Alps	Valais	
Tödi (Piz Russein)	3,614 m (11,857 ft)	1,570 m (5,150 ft)	46°48′40″N 08°54′53″E	Glarus Alps	Glarus/Grisons	1824
Dent des Rosses	3,613 m (11,854 ft)	48 m (157 ft)	46°04′04″N 07°35′25″E	Pennine Alps	Valais	
Grande Fourche	3,610 m (11,840 ft)	275 m (902 ft)	45°58′35″N 07°01′16″E	Mont Blanc massif	Valais	
Barrhorn	3,610 m (11,840 ft)	267 m (876 ft)	46°09′21″N 07°44′03″E	Pennine Alps	Valais	
Piz Prievlus	3,610 m (11,840 ft)	79 m (259 ft)	46°23′47″N 09°54′26″E	Bernina Range	Grisons	
Les Diablons	3,609 m (11,841 ft)	379 m (1,243 ft)	46°08′33″N 07°40′16″E	Pennine Alps	Valais	1863
Schwarzberghorn	3,609 m (11,841 ft)	54 m (177 ft)	45°59′49″N 07°54′32″E	Pennine Alps	Valais	
Aiguilles Rouges du Dolent: Pointe de la Fouly	3,608 m (11,837 ft)	60 m (200 ft)	45°55′58″N 07°02′21″E	Mont Blanc massif	Valais	
Piz Cambrena	3,606 m (11,831 ft)	158 m (518 ft)	46°23′16″N 09°58′52″E	Bernina Range	Grisons	
Finsteraarhorn, Far Southeast-Top	3,603 m (11,821 ft)	70 m (230 ft)	46°31′25″N 08°08′24″E	Bernese Alps	Valais	
Aiguilles du Meitin: L'Epée (Les Maisons Blanches)	3,602 m (11,818 ft)	55 m (180 ft)	45°57′17″N 07°15′51″E	Pennine Alps	Valais	
Ankenbälli (Guttannen)	3,601 m (11,814 ft)	75 m (246 ft)	46°36′42″N 08°08′46″E	Bernese Alps	Valais	

== Enlarged List ==
Summits with a prominence up to 45 metres (selection).

Mountain	Elevation	Prominence	Coordinates	Range	Canton(s)
Bishorn, Pointe Burnaby	4,134 m (13,563 ft)	26 m (85 ft)	46°07′04″N 07°42′53″E	Pennine Alps	Valais
Combin de la Tsessette, West-Top (Grand Combin)	4,115 m (13,501 ft)	30 m (98 ft)	45°56′34″N 07°18′39″E	Pennine Alps	Valais
Rimpfischhorn, Grosser Gendarm	4,107 m (13,474 ft)	40 m (130 ft)	46°01′24″N 07°53′03″E	Pennine Alps	Valais
Eastern Breithorn Twin (Gendarm)	4,106 m (13,471 ft)	36 m (118 ft)	45°56′09″N 07°46′14″E	Pennine Alps	Valais
Wengen Jungfrau	4,085 m (13,402 ft)	26 m (85 ft)	46°32′12″N 07°57′45″E	Bernese Alps	Bern/Valais
Roccia Nera (Breithorn)	4,075 m (13,369 ft)	30 m (98 ft)	45°55′57″N 07°46′31″E	Pennine Alps	Valais
Lauteraarhorn, North-Top	4,015 m (13,173 ft)	40 m (130 ft)	46°35′02″N 08°07′42″E	Bernese Alps	Bern
Lauteraarhorn, Middle-Top	4,014 m (13,169 ft)	33 m (108 ft)	46°35′02″N 08°07′42″E	Bernese Alps	Bern
Piz Bernina, Pizzo Bianco (Piz Alv)	3,993 m (13,100 ft)	20 m (66 ft)	46°22′56″N 09°54′29″E	Bernina Range	Grisons
Hinter Fiescherhorn, South-Top	3,981 m (13,061 ft)	30 m (98 ft)	46°32′47″N 08°04′04″E	Pennine Alps	Valais
Lagginhorn, Middle-Top	3,971 m (13,028 ft)	40 m (130 ft)	46°09′26″N 08°00′11″E	Pennine Alps	Valais
Schalihorn, North-Top	3,954 m (12,972 ft)	40 m (130 ft)	46°05′04″N 07°42′18″E	Pennine Alps	Valais
Aletschhorn, Southeast-Ridge-Gendarme	3,948 m (12,953 ft)	35 m (115 ft)	46°27′54″N 07°59′38″E	Bernese Alps	Valais
Trugberg, Southern Fore-Summit (Note: Height estimated)	3,930 m (12,890 ft)	28 m (92 ft)	46°32′48″N 08°00′55″E	Bernese Alps	Valais
Fletschhorn, East-Top	3,928 m (12,887 ft)	32 m (105 ft)	46°10′04″N 08°00′11″E	Pennine Alps	Valais
Fletschhorn, South-Top	3,914 m (12,841 ft)	25 m (82 ft)	46°10′04″N 08°00′11″E	Pennine Alps	Valais
Lagginhorn, South-Top	3,906 m (12,815 ft)	25 m (82 ft)	46°09′26″N 08°00′11″E	Pennine Alps	Valais
Dent Blanche South-Ridge, Firn-Top	3,901 m (12,799 ft)	33 m (108 ft)	46°02′03″N 07°36′43″E	Pennine Alps	Valais
Klein Dürrenhorn	3,889 m (12,759 ft)	31 m (102 ft)	46°07′11″N 07°50′53″E	Pennine Alps	Valais
Bellavista, Middle-Top	3,885 m (12,746 ft)	31 m (102 ft)	46°22′25″N 09°55′56″E	Bernina Range	Grisons
Piz Palü, East-Top	3,883 m (12,740 ft)	39 m (128 ft)	46°22′42″N 09°57′38″E	Bernina Range	Grisons
Pointe du Mountet	3,877 m (12,720 ft)	42 m (138 ft)	46°03′34″N 07°41′07″E	Pennine Alps	Valais
Piz Scerscen, Schneehaube	3,874 m (12,710 ft)	28 m (92 ft)	46°22′42″N 09°54′02″E	Bernina Range	Grisons
Roseg Pitschen	3,867 m (12,687 ft)	43 m (141 ft)	46°22′25″N 09°52′59″E	Bernina Range	Grisons
Feechopf, North-Ridge-Gendarme	3,863 m (12,674 ft)	30 m (98 ft)	46°02′59″N 07°52′58″E	Pennine Alps	Valais
Mittaghorn, West-Top	3,829 m (12,562 ft)	37 m (121 ft)	46°29′54″N 07°55′47″E	Bernese Alps	Bern/Valais
Klein Fiescherhorn, Southeast-Top	3,825 m (12,549 ft)	33 m (108 ft)	46°33′20″N 08°04′32″E	Bernese Alps	Bern/Valais
Mont Blanc de Cheilon, East-Top	3,817 m (12,523 ft)	30 m (98 ft)	45°59′35″N 07°25′02″E	Pennine Alps	Valais
Bietschhorn-Southeast-Ridge, Grosser Gendarm	3,782 m (12,408 ft)	35 m (115 ft)	46°23′30″N 07°51′03″E	Bernese Alps	Valais
Breithorn (Blatten), Southeast-Top	3,779 m (12,398 ft)	26 m (85 ft)	46°26′08″N 07°53′38″E	Bernese Alps	Valais
Pigne d'Arolla, South-Top	3,772 m (12,375 ft)	35 m (115 ft)	45°59′28″N 07°27′18″E	Pennine Alps	Valais
Dom, Festi-Kin-Ridge pt 3768	3,768 m (12,362 ft)	34 m (112 ft)	46°05′38″N 07°51′32″E	Pennine Alps	Valais
Mönch, Eigerjöcher-Ridge, Middle-Top	3,768 m (12,362 ft)	30 m (98 ft)	46°33′30″N 07°59′50″E	Bernese Alps	Bern/Valais
Ebnefluh, Southwest-Top	3,757 m (12,326 ft)	33 m (108 ft)	46°30′29″N 07°57′11″E	Bernese Alps	Bern/Valais
Aletschhorn South-Ridge, Double-Tower	3,744 m (12,283 ft)	45 m (148 ft)	46°27′54″N 07°59′38″E	Bernese Alps	Valais
Klein Lauteraarhorn, South-Top (Southern Double-Tower)	3,735 m (12,254 ft)	45 m (148 ft)	46°34′44″N 08°08′21″E	Bernese Alps	Bern
Weissmies, Far North-Top	3,720 m (12,200 ft)	30 m (98 ft)	46°07′40″N 08°00′44″E	Pennine Alps	Valais
Ebnefluh, Southeast-Top	3,717 m (12,195 ft)	32 m (105 ft)	46°30′29″N 07°57′11″E	Bernese Alps	Bern/Valais
Aletschhorn South-Ridge, Quadruple-Tower pt 3716	3,716 m (12,192 ft)	45 m (148 ft)	46°27′54″N 07°59′38″E	Bernese Alps	Valais
Kleines Wannenhorn	3,707 m (12,162 ft)	38 m (125 ft)	46°29′00″N 08°06′16″E	Bernese Alps	Valais
La Singla, Middle-Top	3,704 m (12,152 ft)	40 m (130 ft)	45°56′45″N 07°28′19″E	Pennine Alps	Valais
Grosshorn, West-Ridge-Gendarme	3,700 m (12,100 ft)	25 m (82 ft)	46°29′12″N 07°54′39″E	Bernese Alps	Bern/Valais
Finsteraarhorn, Southeast-Top	3,694 m (12,119 ft)	45 m (148 ft)	46°31′25″N 08°08′24″E	Bernese Alps	Valais
Tête de Milon	3,693 m (12,116 ft)	43 m (141 ft)	46°07′07″N 07°41′29″E	Pennine Alps	Valais
La Singla, South-Top	3,690 m (12,110 ft)	45 m (148 ft)	45°56′45″N 07°28′19″E	Pennine Alps	Valais
Mont Durand/Arbenhorn, Northeast-Top	3,679 m (12,070 ft)	30 m (98 ft)	46°02′02″N 07°39′02″E	Pennine Alps	Valais
La Singla, Grand Blanchen	3,677 m (12,064 ft)	35 m (115 ft)	45°56′45″N 07°28′19″E	Pennine Alps	Valais
Pointe Nord du Brenay	3,675 m (12,057 ft)	37 m (121 ft)	45°58′28″N 07°26′50″E	Pennine Alps	Valais
Sattelhorn (Geisshorn Northeast-Top), North-Top	3,675 m (12,057 ft)	35 m (115 ft)	46°26′28″N 08°00′21″E	Bernese Alps	Valais
Rotstock, North-Top (Ski-Top)	3,673 m (12,051 ft)	38 m (125 ft)	46°26′07″N 08°00′07″E	Bernese Alps	Valais
Pointe Sud du Brenay	3,672 m (12,047 ft)	32 m (105 ft)	45°58′28″N 07°26′50″E	Pennine Alps	Valais
Hohwänghorn (Mont Durand/Arbenhorn)	3,671 m (12,044 ft)	35 m (115 ft)	46°02′02″N 07°39′02″E	Pennine Alps	Valais
Brunegghorn, Southwest-Top	3,671 m (12,044 ft)	32 m (105 ft)	46°07′33″N 07°44′45″E	Pennine Alps	Valais
Grande Aiguille, Middle-Top (Les Maisons Blanches)	3,665 m (12,024 ft)	40 m (130 ft)	45°57′01″N 07°15′53″E	Pennine Alps	Valais
Combin de Valsorey, Top Bivacco Musso (Grand Combin)	3,661 m (12,011 ft)	32 m (105 ft)	45°56′17″N 07°17′26″E	Pennine Alps	Valais
Pollux (Zwillinge), Schalbetterflue pt 3660	3,660 m (12,010 ft)	42 m (138 ft)	45°55′40″N 07°47′07″E	Pennine Alps	Valais
Besso, North-Top	3,659 m (12,005 ft)	30 m (98 ft)	46°04′39″N 07°39′32″E	Pennine Alps	Valais
Ober Äschhorn, Southwest-Top	3,657 m (11,998 ft)	31 m (102 ft)	46°03′38″N 07°42′28″E	Pennine Alps	Valais
Kinhorn, West-Top	3,655 m (11,991 ft)	35 m (115 ft)	46°04′38″N 07°50′02″E	Pennine Alps	Valais
Cima di Jazzi, Southwest-Top	3,652 m (11,982 ft)	36 m (118 ft)	45°58′52″N 07°53′41″E	Pennine Alps	Valais
Klein Lauteraarhorn, Lower Southeast-Top	3,648 m (11,969 ft)	45 m (148 ft)	46°34′44″N 08°08′21″E	Bernese Alps	Bern
Blanc de Moming, Dôme	3,645 m (11,959 ft)	27 m (89 ft)	46°04′25″N 07°39′52″E	Pennine Alps	Valais
Wellenkuppe, North-Ridge pt 3643	3,643 m (11,952 ft)	40 m (130 ft)	46°02′31″N 07°40′40″E	Pennine Alps	Valais
Mitre de l'Evêque, South-Top	3,642 m (11,949 ft)	35 m (115 ft)	45°58′07″N 07°30′23″E	Pennine Alps	Valais
Balfrin, Northeast-Top	3,641 m (11,946 ft)	39 m (128 ft)	46°08′06″N 07°52′49″E	Pennine Alps	Valais
Aiguilles du Meitin: Middle-Top (Les Maisons Blanches)	3,640 m (11,940 ft)	35 m (115 ft)	45°57′20″N 07°15′47″E	Pennine Alps	Valais
Kleines Dreieckhorn	3,639 m (11,939 ft)	41 m (135 ft)	46°28′08″N 08°02′03″E	Bernese Alps	Valais
Neue Weisstorspitze, North-Top	3,636 m (11,929 ft)	43 m (141 ft)	45°59′33″N 07°54′22″E	Pennine Alps	Valais
L'Aiguille du Vélan	3,633 m (11,919 ft)	30 m (98 ft)	45°53′30″N 07°15′06″E	Pennine Alps	Valais
Vorderes Geisshorn	3,632 m (11,916 ft)	38 m (125 ft)	46°26′28″N 08°00′21″E	Bernese Alps	Valais
Dom, Festi-Kin-Ridge pt 3629	3,629 m (11,906 ft)	39 m (128 ft)	46°05′38″N 07°51′32″E	Pennine Alps	Valais
Aiguilles de Boveire, North-Top	3,628 m (11,903 ft)	39 m (128 ft)	45°58′14″N 07°16′18″E	Pennine Alps	Valais
Grand Cornier, Les Bouquetins pt 3627	3,627 m (11,900 ft)	45 m (148 ft)	46°03′07″N 07°36′41″E	Pennine Alps	Valais
Mont Dolent, Lower Southeast-Top	3,627 m (11,900 ft)	30 m (98 ft)	45°55′21″N 07°02′46″E	Mont Blanc massif	Valais
Klein Lauteraarhorn, Far Southeast-Double-Gendarme	3,626 m (11,896 ft)	45 m (148 ft)	46°34′44″N 08°08′21″E	Bernese Alps	Bern
Bigerhorn	3,626 m (11,896 ft)	32 m (105 ft)	46°08′42″N 07°52′14″E	Pennine Alps	Valais
Nördliches Wysshorn	3,625 m (11,893 ft)	45 m (148 ft)	46°26′46″N 07°57′13″E	Bernese Alps	Valais
Aiguilles du Meitin: Pointe de Challand (Les Maisons Blanches)	3,624 m (11,890 ft)	25 m (82 ft)	45°57′20″N 07°15′47″E	Pennine Alps	Valais
Tournelon Blanc, Middle-Top	3,623 m (11,886 ft)	35 m (115 ft)	45°58′11″N 07°19′20″E	Pennine Alps	Valais
Breitlauihorn, Tyfelsgrat	3,622 m (11,883 ft)	40 m (130 ft)	46°24′46″N 07°52′51″E	Bernese Alps	Bern
Kleines Fillarhorn	3,621 m (11,880 ft)	42 m (138 ft)	45°57′50″N 07°52′52″E	Pennine Alps	Valais
Morgenhorn (Blüemlisalp)	3,620 m (11,880 ft)	40 m (130 ft)	46°28′08″N 07°44′05″E	Bernese Alps	Bern
Dents du Vélan, Middle-Top	3,619 m (11,873 ft)	30 m (98 ft)	45°53′30″N 07°15′06″E	Pennine Alps	Valais
Cima Brioschi	3,616 m (11,864 ft)	41 m (135 ft)	45°57′50″N 07°52′52″E	Pennine Alps	Valais
Grande Aiguille, Northeast-Top (Les Maisons Blanches)	3,610 m (11,840 ft)	45 m (148 ft)	45°57′01″N 07°15′53″E	Pennine Alps	Valais
Schneestock	3,608 m (11,837 ft)	38 m (125 ft)	46°38′52″N 08°25′19″E	Uri Alps	Uri/Valais
Ebnefluh, Southeast-Ridge pt 3603	3,603 m (11,821 ft)	40 m (130 ft)	46°30′29″N 07°57′11″E	Bernese Alps	Bern/Valais
Aiguilles de Boveire, East-Top	3,603 m (11,821 ft)	40 m (130 ft)	45°58′14″N 07°16′18″E	Pennine Alps	Valais
Anungrat, Southeast-Top pt 3603	3,603 m (11,821 ft)	30 m (98 ft)	46°29′06″N 07°56′23″E	Bernese Alps	Valais
Aiguilles de Boveire, Far North-Top	3,602 m (11,818 ft)	45 m (148 ft)	45°58′14″N 07°16′18″E	Pennine Alps	Valais
Aiguilles Rouges du Dolent: Grand Gendarme (Note: géoportail.gouv.fr: 3600 m, map.geo.admin.ch: 3599 m/3598 m)	3,600 m (11,800 ft)	25 m (82 ft)	45°56′18″N 07°02′08″E	Mont Blanc massif	Valais

== See also ==
- List of mountain lakes of Switzerland - highest lakes of Switzerland
- List of mountain railways in Switzerland - highest railways in Switzerland
- List of highest paved roads in Switzerland
