= Rotstock =

Mountain in Switzerland

- Location within Switzerland

Highest point
- Elevation: 3,699 m (12,136 ft)
- Prominence: 118 m (387 ft)
- Parent peak: Geisshorn
- Coordinates: 46°26′07″N 8°00′07″E

Geography
- Location: Valais, Switzerland
- Parent range: Bernese Alps

The Rotstock (3,699 m) is a mountain of the Bernese Alps, overlooking the Aletsch Glacier in the Swiss canton of Valais. It lies on the range between the Oberaletsch Glacier and the Aletsch Glacier, south of the Geisshorn.
