= Blanc de Moming =

Mountain in Switzerland

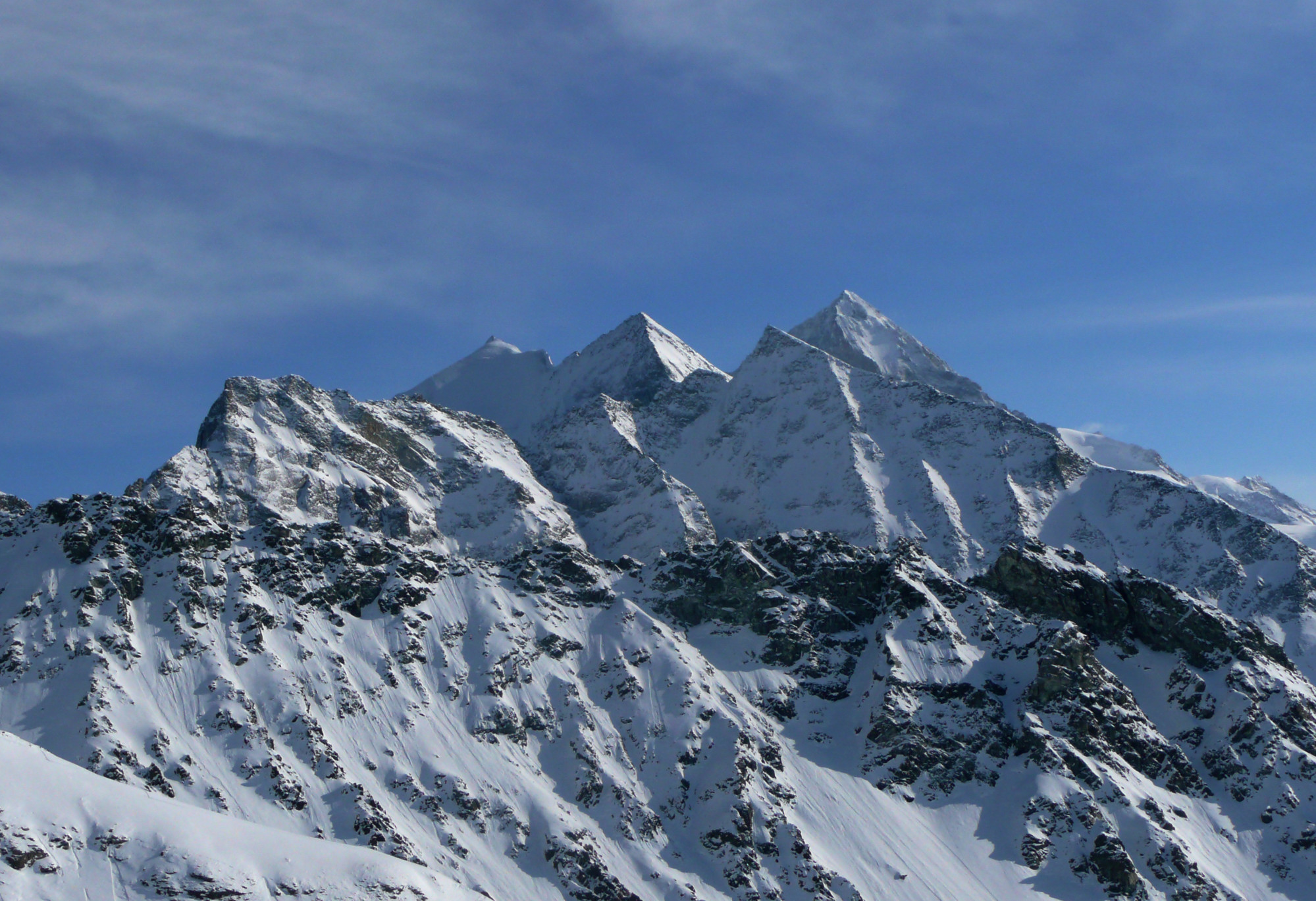

Highest point
- Elevation: 3,661 m (12,011 ft)
- Prominence: 79 m (259 ft)
- Parent peak: Weisshorn
- Coordinates: 46°4′25″N 7°39′52″E

Geography
- Location within Switzerland
- Location: Valais, Switzerland
- Parent range: Pennine Alps

The Blanc de Moming is a mountain of the Pennine Alps, located south of Zinal in the canton of Valais. It lies between the Besso and the Zinalrothorn. It is connected to the Zinalrothorn by a ridge named Arête du Blanc.
