= Hugihorn =

Mountain in Switzerland

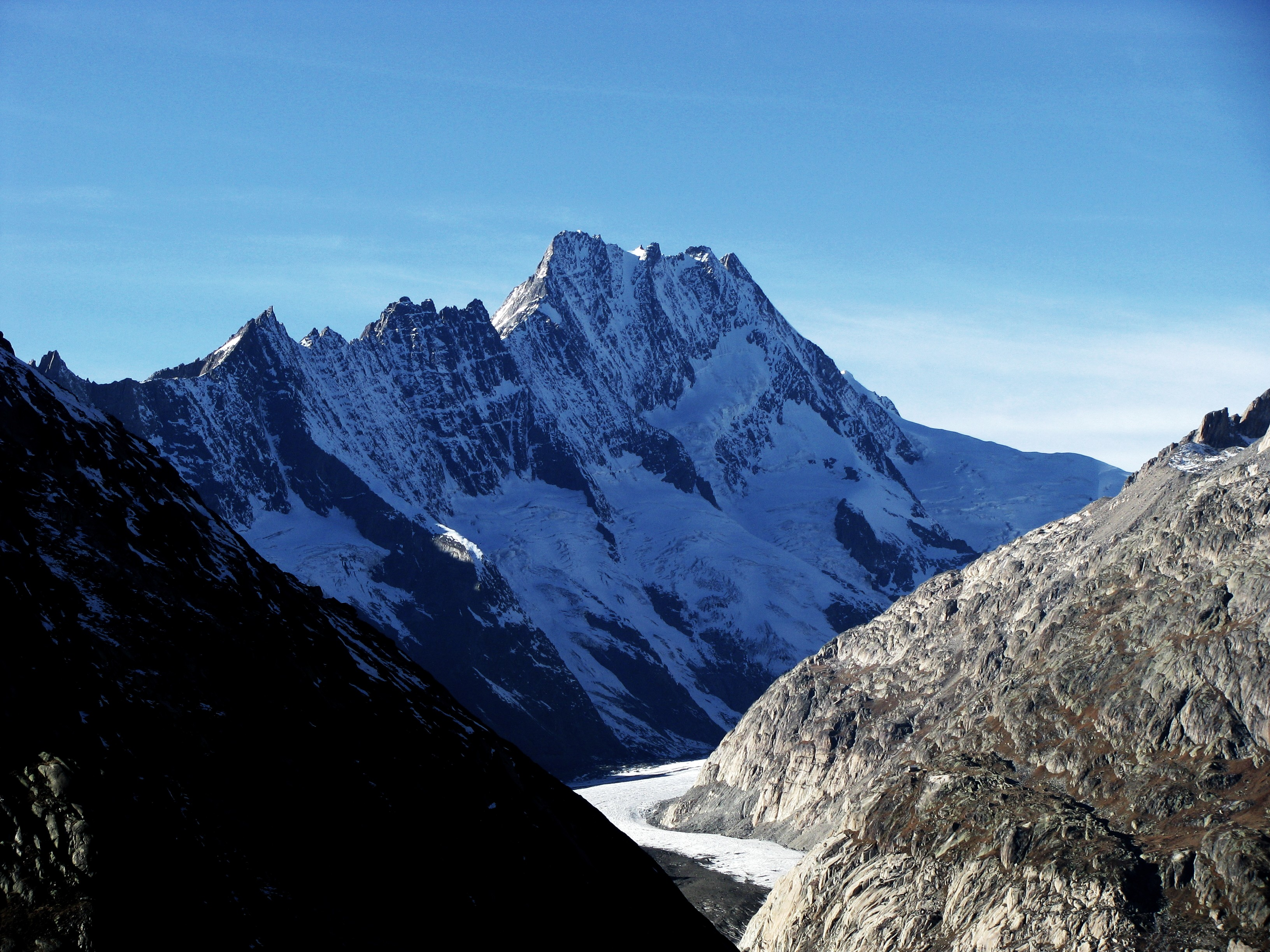
- The Hugihorn (left peak) and the Lauteraarhorn (centre)

Highest point
- Elevation: 3,647 m (11,965 ft)
- Prominence: 82 m (269 ft)
- Parent peak: Klein Lauteraarhorn
- Coordinates: 46°34′22″N 8°08′48.5″E

Geography
- Location within Switzerland
- Location: Bern, Switzerland
- Parent range: Bernese Alps

Climbing
- Easiest route: rock/snow climb

The Hugihorn (3,647 m) is a peak of the Bernese Alps, overlooking the Unteraar Glacier in the canton of Bern. It lies south of the Klein Lauteraarhorn, on the range separating the Strahlegg Glacier from the Lauteraar Glacier, both tributaries of the Unteraar Glacier.

The mountain was named after the Swiss geologist Franz Joseph Hugi.

== See also ==
- List of mountains of Switzerland named after people
