= La Singla =

Mountain in Switzerland

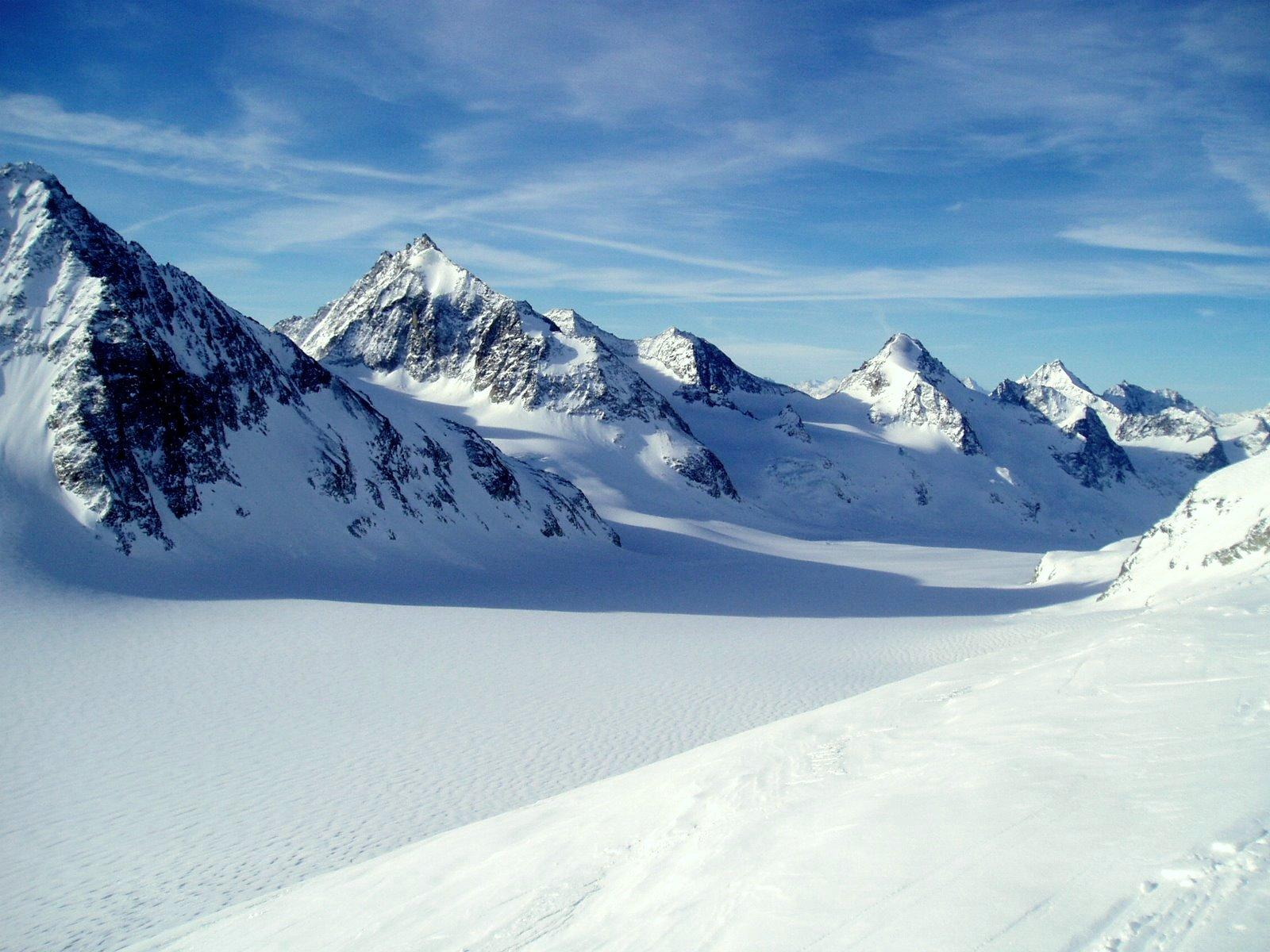
- La Singla (center left) from the Otemma Glacier

Highest point
- Elevation: 3,714 m (12,185 ft)
- Prominence: 452 m (1,483 ft)
- Parent peak: L'Evêque
- Listing: Alpine mountains above 3000 m
- Coordinates: 45°56′45.4″N 7°28′18.5″E

Geography
- Location within Alps
- Location of the Dom Location in the Alps
- Location: Valais, Switzerland; Aosta Valley, Italy
- Parent range: Pennine Alps

La Singla, also spelled La Sengla, is a 3,714 m mountain of the Pennine Alps, located on the border between Switzerland and Italy. It is the highest summit lying between the valleys of Bagnes (Valais) and Valpelline (Aosta Valley). On its northern side La Singla overlooks the Otemma Glacier.

== See also ==
- List of mountains of Switzerland
