= Tournelon Blanc =

Mountain in Switzerland

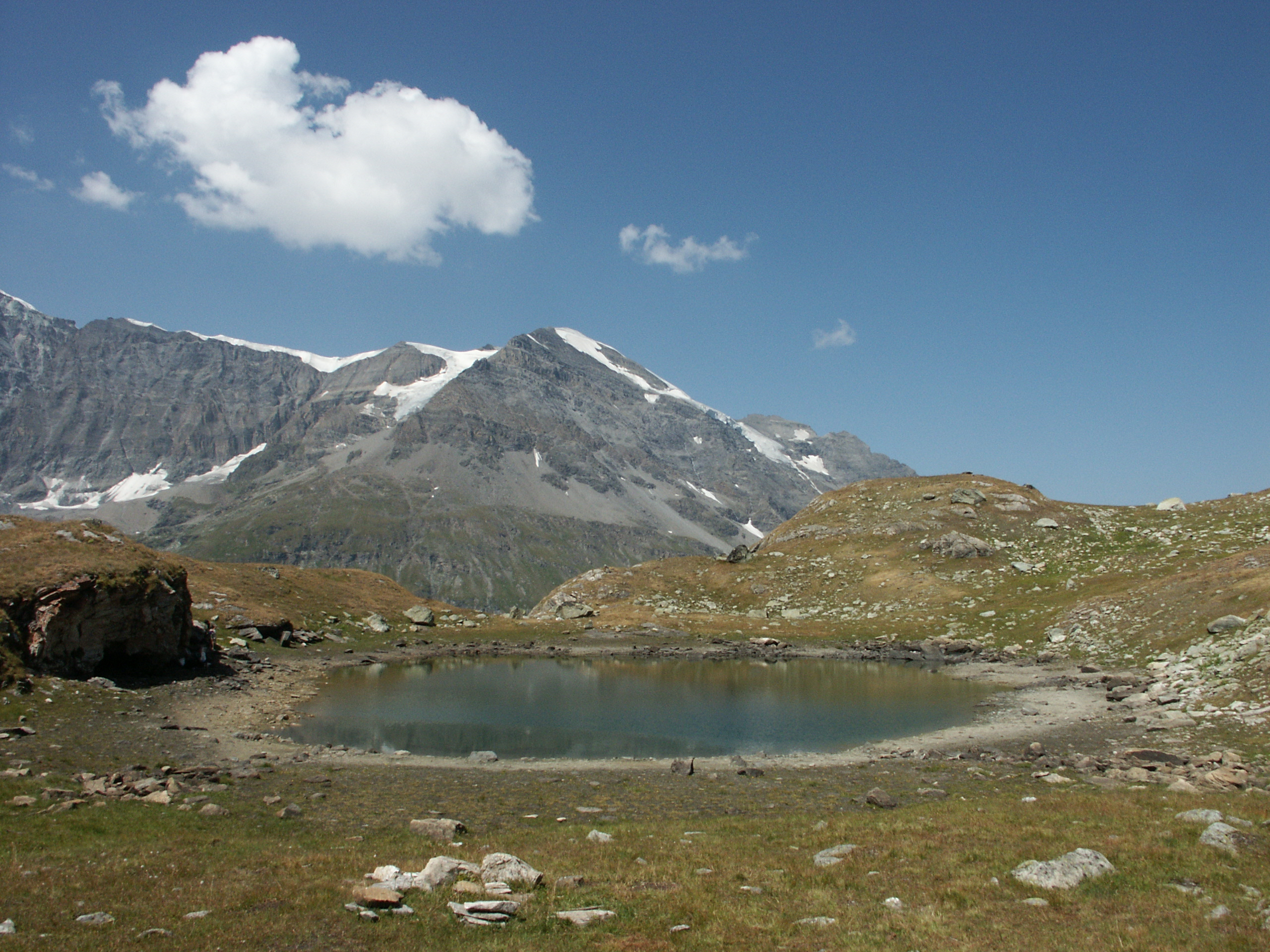
- Tournelon Blanc from south east, from Tsofeiret

Highest point
- Elevation: 3,700 m (12,100 ft)
- Prominence: 159 m (522 ft)
- Parent peak: Grand Combin
- Coordinates: 45°58′11″N 7°19′20″E

Geography
- Location within Switzerland
- Location: Valais, Switzerland
- Parent range: Pennine Alps

The Tournelon Blanc is a mountain of the Swiss Pennine Alps, overlooking the lake of Mauvoisin in the canton of Valais. It belongs to the Grand Combin massif and lies east of the Corbassière Glacier.
