= Schinhorn =

Mountain in Switzerland

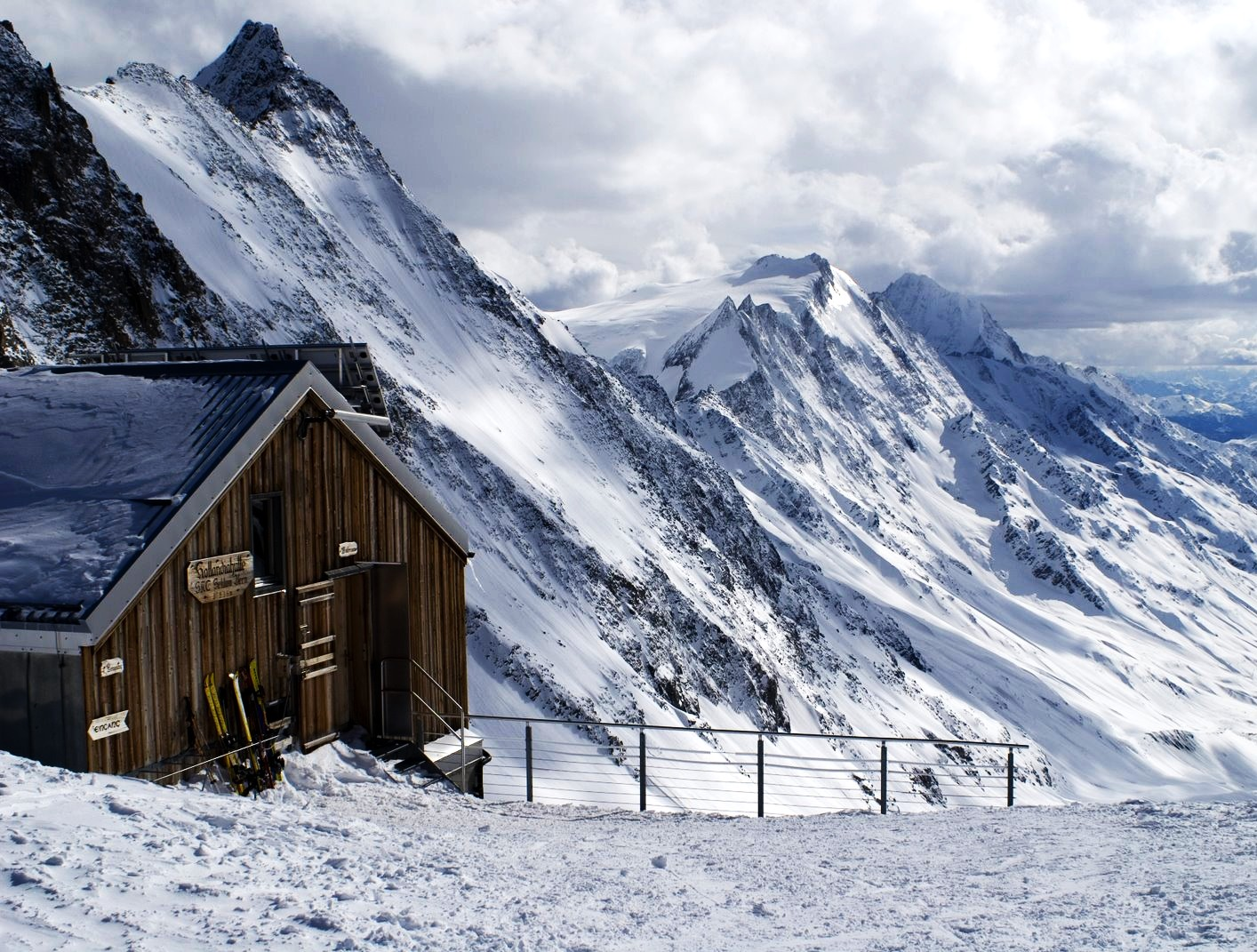
- From left: the sharp ridge Distlighorn and the dark tower Schinhorn, seen from the Lötschenlücke

Highest point
- Elevation: 3,796 m (12,454 ft)
- Prominence: 422 m (1,385 ft)
- Parent peak: Aletschhorn
- Listing: Alpine mountains above 3000 m
- Coordinates: 46°27′05″N 7°56′48″E

Geography
- Location within Switzerland
- Location: Valais, Switzerland
- Parent range: Bernese Alps

Climbing
- First ascent: 30 August 1869 by E. J. Häberlin and Johann and Andreas von Weissenfluh

The Schinhorn is a mountain of the Bernese Alps, located west of the Aletschhorn in the canton of Valais. It lies between the valleys of Lötschental (north) and Oberaletsch (south). The Schinhorn has a northeastern Subpeak, the sharp ridge Distlighorn (3,716 m).

== See also ==
- List of mountains of Switzerland
