= Kinhorn =

Mountain in the Swiss Alps

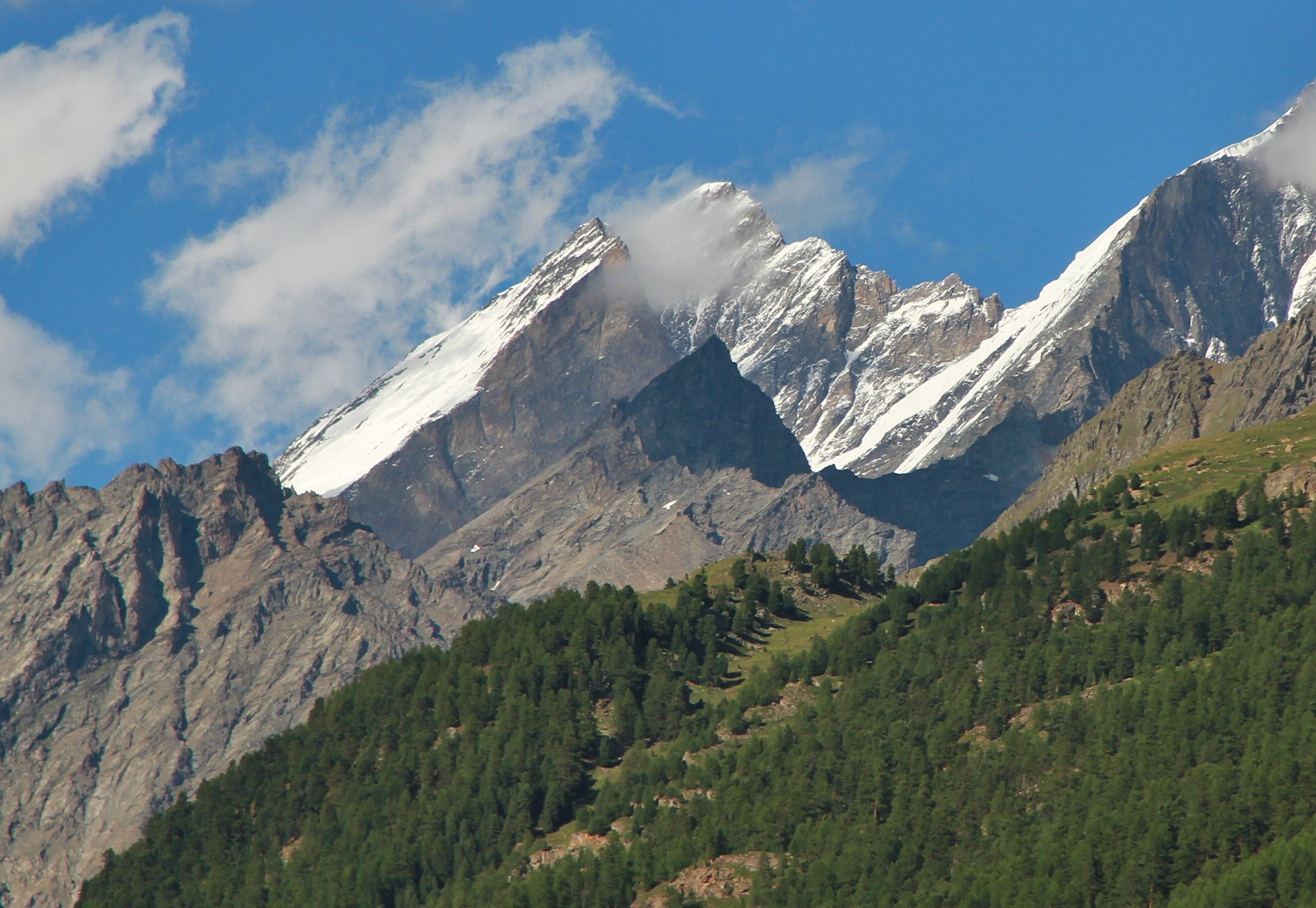
- The Kinhorn (centre) with the Dom (background) from the south

Highest point
- Elevation: 3,750 m (12,300 ft)
- Prominence: 110 m (360 ft)
- Parent peak: Dom
- Coordinates: 46°4′38″N 7°50′1.6″E

Geography
- Location within Switzerland
- Location: Valais, Switzerland
- Parent range: Pennine Alps

The Kinhorn is a mountain of the Swiss Pennine Alps, overlooking Täsch in the canton of Valais. It is located on the ridge west of the Täschhorn.
