= Pointe du Mountet =

Mountain in Switzerland

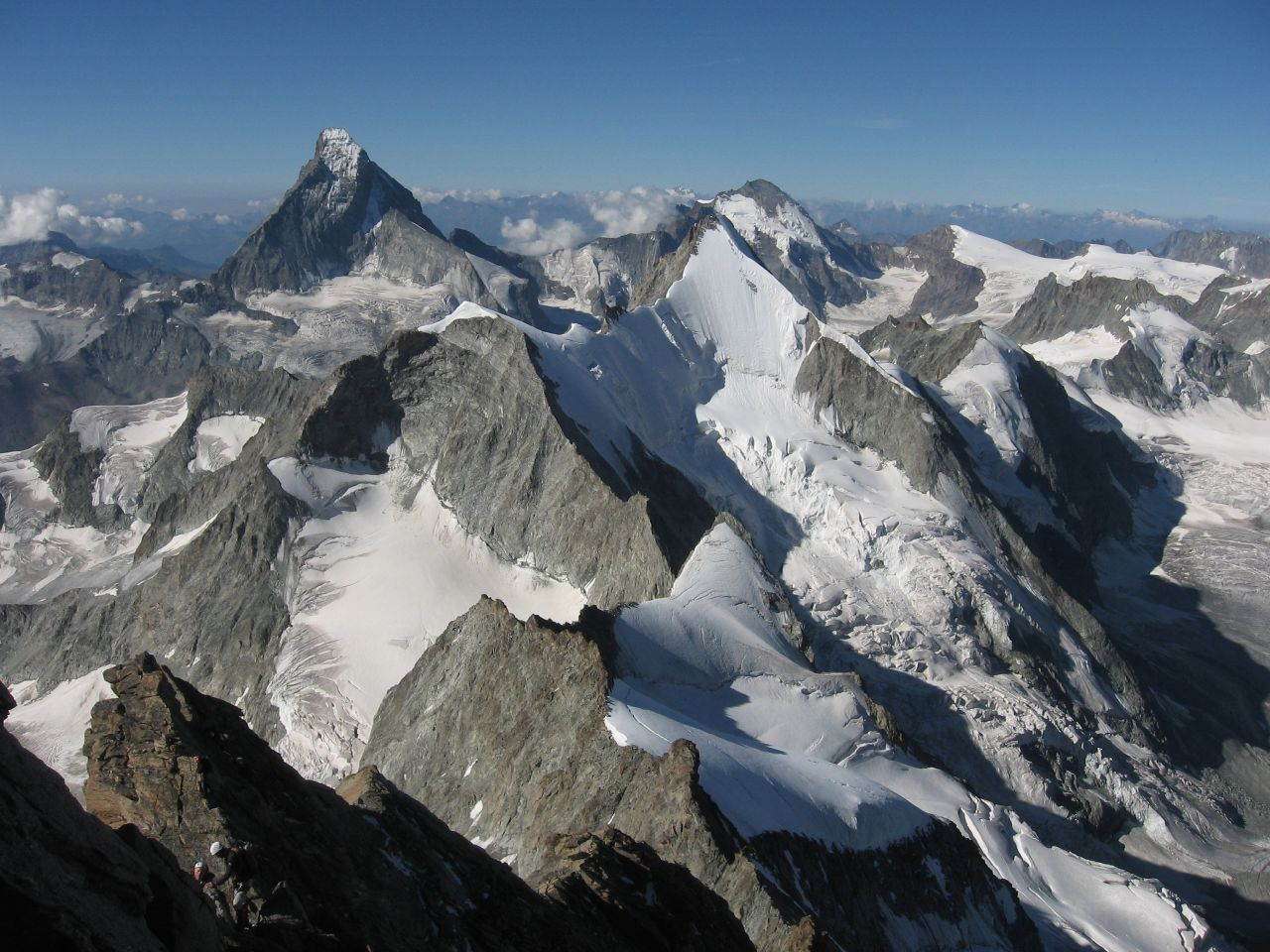
- View from the Zinalrothorn. Pointe du Mountet is on the lower middle.

Highest point
- Elevation: 3,877 m (12,720 ft)
- Prominence: 42 m (138 ft)
- Parent peak: Zinalrothorn
- Coordinates: 46°03′33.8″N 7°41′07.3″E

Geography
- Location within Switzerland
- Location: Valais, Switzerland
- Parent range: Pennine Alps

The Pointe du Mountet is a mountain of the Swiss Pennine Alps, situated west of Zermatt in Valais. It is located south of the Zinalrothorn.
