= Kranzberg (mountain) =

Mountain of the Bernese Alps

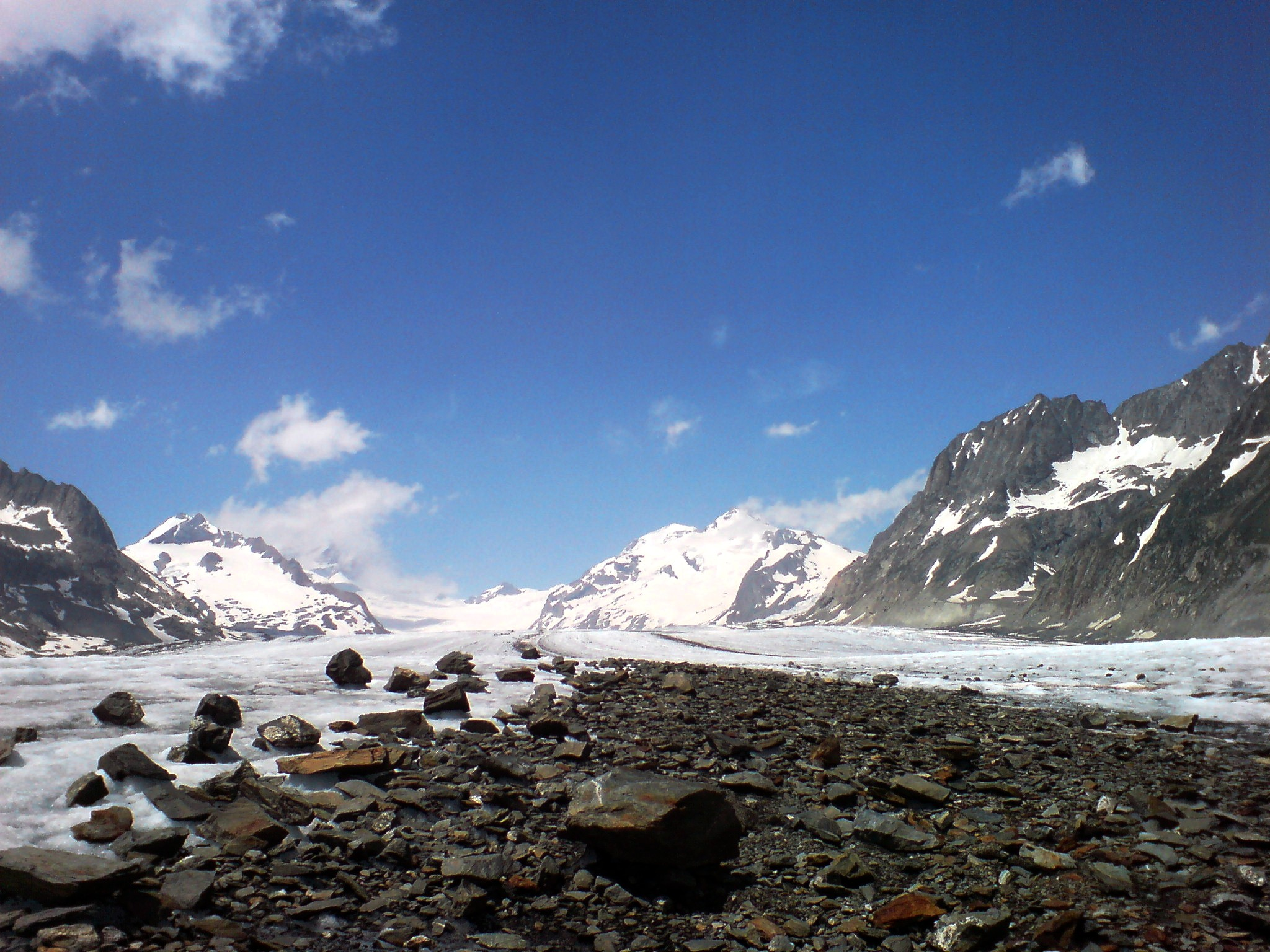
- The Kranzberg (left peak) seen from the Aletsch Glacier

Highest point
- Elevation: 3,741 m (12,274 ft)
- Prominence: 83 m (272 ft)
- Parent peak: Jungfrau
- Coordinates: 46°31′19.5″N 7°58′52″E

Geography
- Location within Switzerland
- Location: Valais, Switzerland
- Parent range: Bernese Alps

The Kranzberg North-Top (3,741 m) is a mountain of the Bernese Alps, overlooking the Aletsch Glacier in the Swiss canton of Valais, close to the border with the canton of Bern. Its massif separates two glaciers: the Grosser Aletschfirn and the Jungfraufirn, both part of the Aletsch Glacier.

The Kranzberg South-Top (3,666 m) is located south-east of the Kranzberg North-Top.

Debris accumulating on both sides of the mountain forms one of the two important supraglacial moraines of the Aletsch Glacier (see picture on the top right of the article).
