= Adlerhorn =

Mountain in Valais, Switzerland

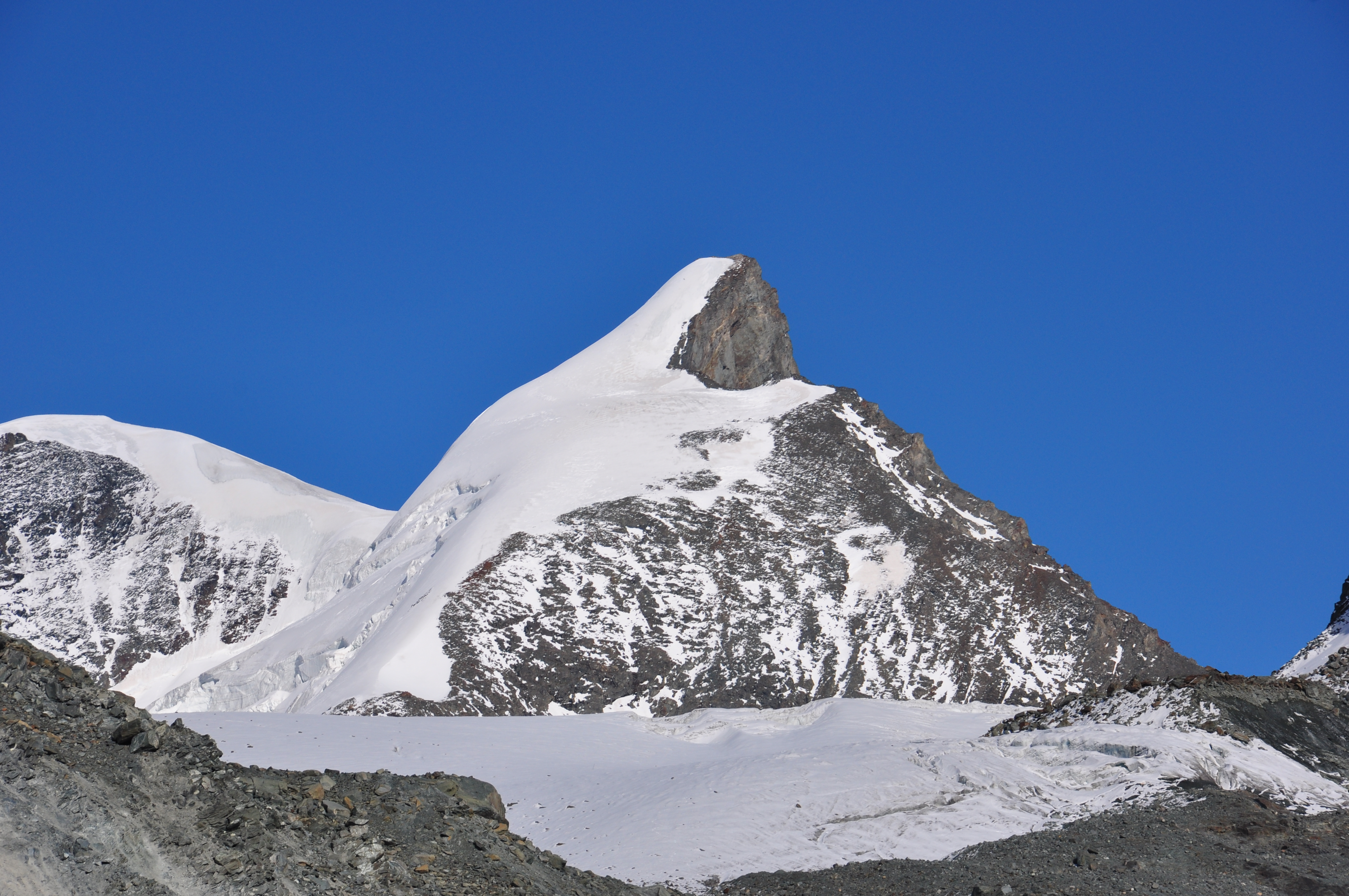
- Adlerhorn from the west side

Highest point
- Elevation: 3,988 m (13,084 ft)
- Prominence: 58 m (190 ft)
- Parent peak: Strahlhorn
- Coordinates: 46°0′32.8″N 7°53′20.5″E

Geography
- Location within Switzerland
- Location: Valais, Switzerland
- Parent range: Pennine Alps

The Adlerhorn is a mountain of the Swiss Pennine Alps, located east of Zermatt in the canton of Valais. It lies west of the Strahlhorn.
