= Bouquetins =

Mountain in Switzerland

- Aerial view of the Bouquetins

Highest point
- Elevation: 3,838 m (12,592 ft)
- Prominence: 486 m (1,594 ft)
- Parent peak: Weisshorn
- Listing: Alpine mountains above 3000 m
- Coordinates: 45°58′54″N 7°32′44″E

Geography
- Location within Alps
- Location of the Matterhorn Location in the Alps
- Location: Valais, Switzerland; Aosta Valley, Italy
- Parent range: Pennine Alps

Climbing
- First ascent: 6 September 1871, by Jean Anzévui, Arthur Bold Hamilton, and Jean Vuignier

The Dents de Bouquetins or just the Bouquetins (French for Alpine ibices) are a multi-summited mountain of the Alps between Switzerland and Italy. They form a ridge composed of several summits above 3,600 metres, of which the highest is 3,838 metres. The Bouquetins are the highest mountain on the main watershed of the Pennine Alps west of the Dent d'Hérens.

A shelter (Refuge des Bouquetins), owned by the Swiss Alpine Club, is located at the western base of the mountain.

== See also ==
- List of mountains of Switzerland
