= La Sâle =

Mountain in Switzerland

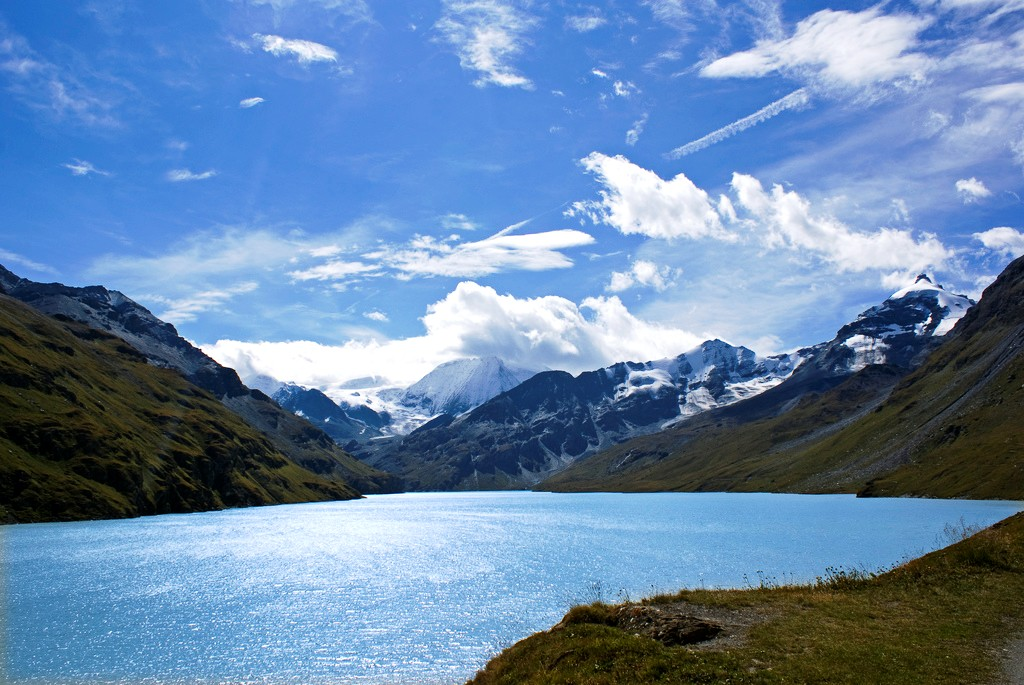
- La Sâle (far right) seen from Lac des Dix

Highest point
- Elevation: 3,646 m (11,962 ft)
- Prominence: 112 m (367 ft)
- Parent peak: Le Pleureur
- Coordinates: 46°1′25″N 7°22′19.2″E

Geography
- Location within Switzerland
- Location: Valais, Switzerland
- Parent range: Pennine Alps

La Sâle is a mountain of the Swiss Pennine Alps, overlooking the Lac des Dix in the canton of Valais. It is located between the valleys of Bagnes and Hérens, north of Le Pleureur.
