= Combin de la Tsessette =

Mountain in Switzerland

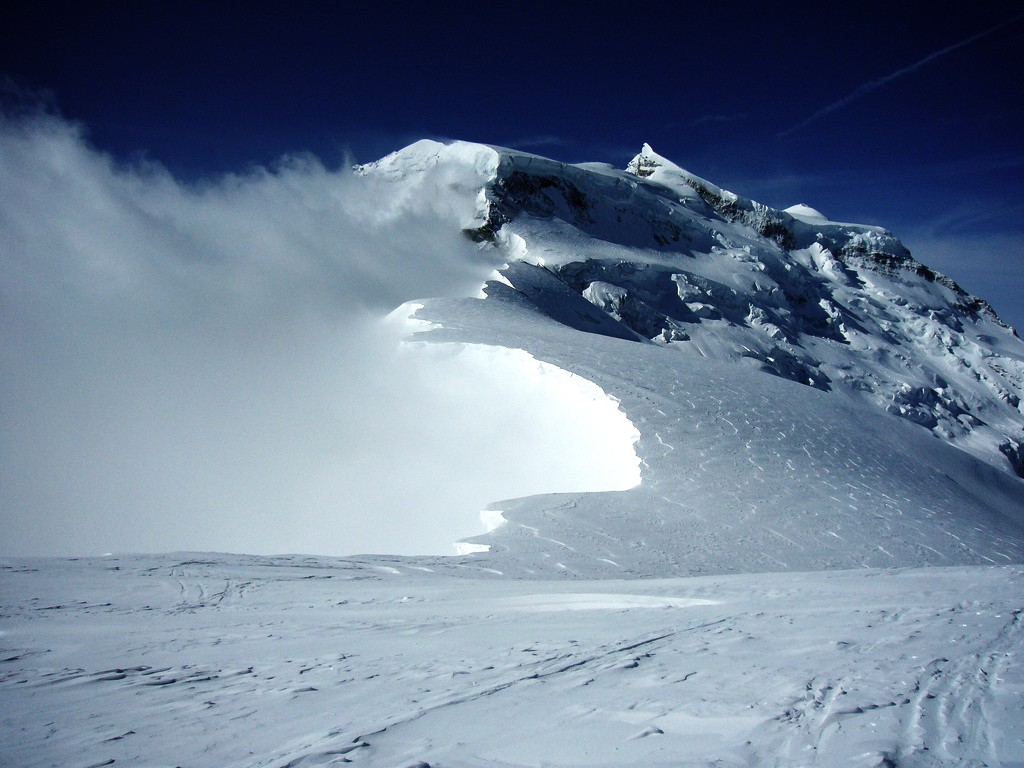
- Combin de la Tsessette (center) and Grand Combin summit (right)

Highest point
- Elevation: 4,132 m (13,556 ft)
- Prominence: 57 m (187 ft)
- Parent peak: Grand Combin
- Isolation: 0.74 km (0.46 mi)
- Coordinates: 45°56′34″N 7°18′39″E

Geography
- Location within Switzerland
- Location: Valais, Switzerland
- Parent range: Pennine Alps

Climbing
- First ascent: E.F.M.Benecke and H.A.Cohen on 21 July 1894.
- Easiest route: From the Panossiere hut via Mur de la Cote and Col du Croissant.

The Combin de la Tsessette is the third highest summit in the Grand Combin massif, in the canton of Valais, Switzerland. It lies east of the Grand Combin summit (Combin de Grafeneire) and overlooks the Lac de Mauvoisin.

First known ascent by E.F.M.Benecke and H.A.Cohen on 21 July 1894.

== See also ==
- List of 4000 metre peaks of the Alps
