= Pointe des Genevois =

Mountain in Switzerland

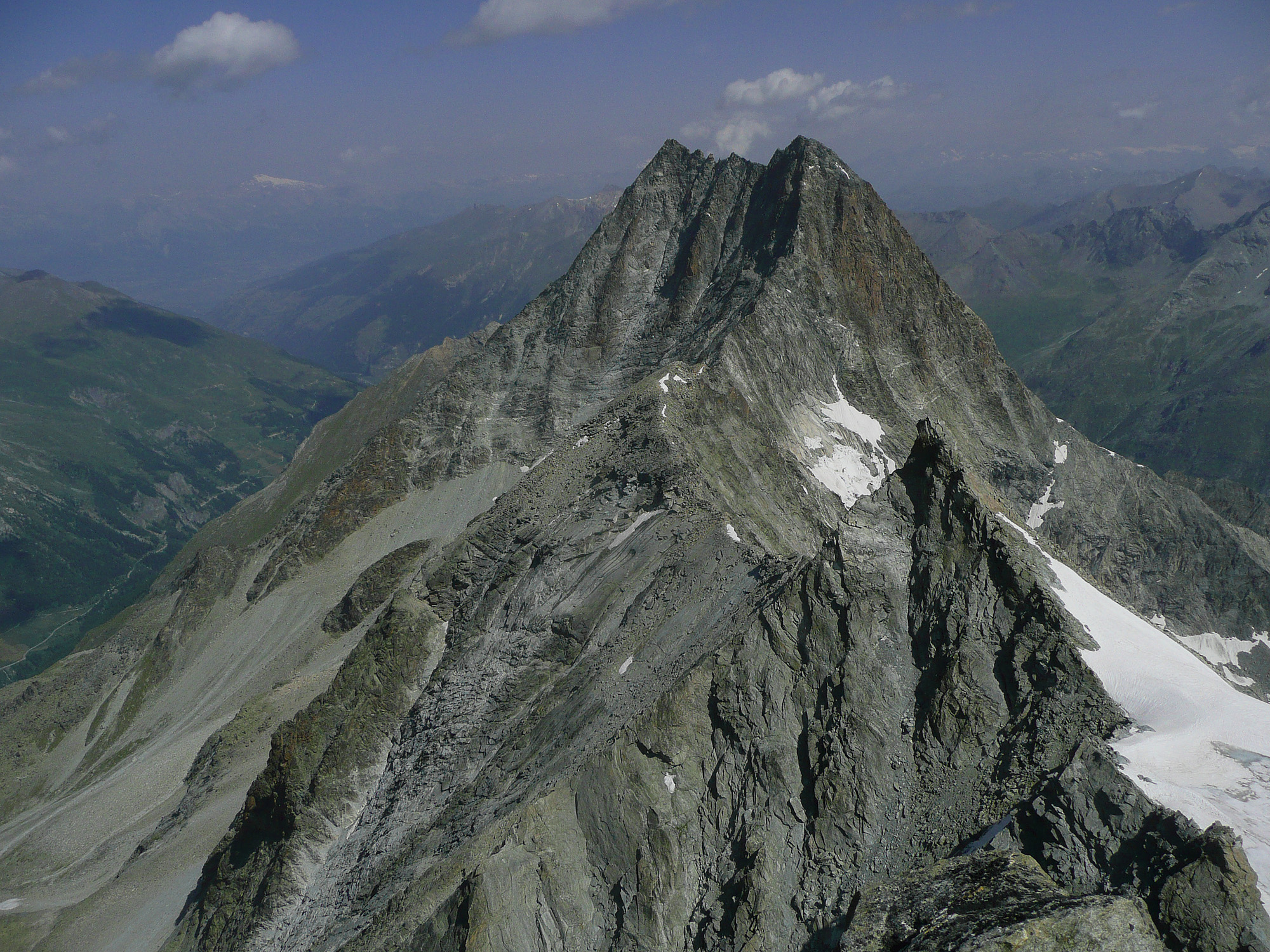
- Dent de Perroc (center) and Pointe des Genevois (front right)

Highest point
- Elevation: 3,674 m (12,054 ft)
- Prominence: 54 m (177 ft)
- Parent peak: Dent de Perroc
- Coordinates: 46°2′12.3″N 7°31′33.3″E

Geography
- Location within Switzerland
- Location: Valais, Switzerland
- Parent range: Pennine Alps

The Pointe des Genevois is a mountain of the Swiss Pennine Alps, overlooking Arolla in the canton of Valais. It lies just south of the higher summit of the Dent de Perroc.
