= Hohgwächte =

Mountain in Switzerland

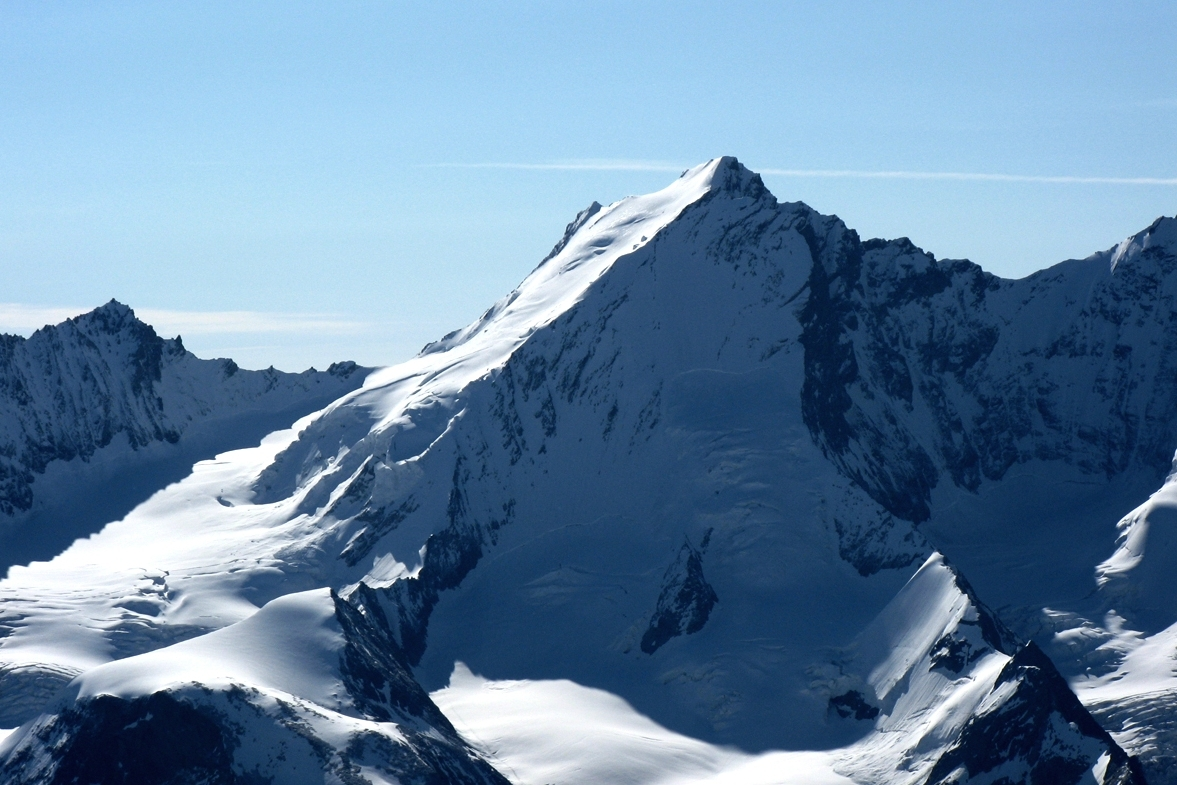
- Dom and Hohgwächte (foreground)

Highest point
- Elevation: 3,740 m (12,270 ft)
- Prominence: 82 m (269 ft)
- Coordinates: 46°06′14″N 7°50′26.7″E

Geography
- Location within Switzerland
- Location: Valais, Switzerland
- Parent range: Pennine Alps

The Hohgwächte is a mountain of the Pennine Alps, situated near Randa in Valais. It belongs to the Mischabel massif and is located west of the Dom and the Festijoch
