= Fluchthorn (Pennine Alps) =

Mountain in Switzerland

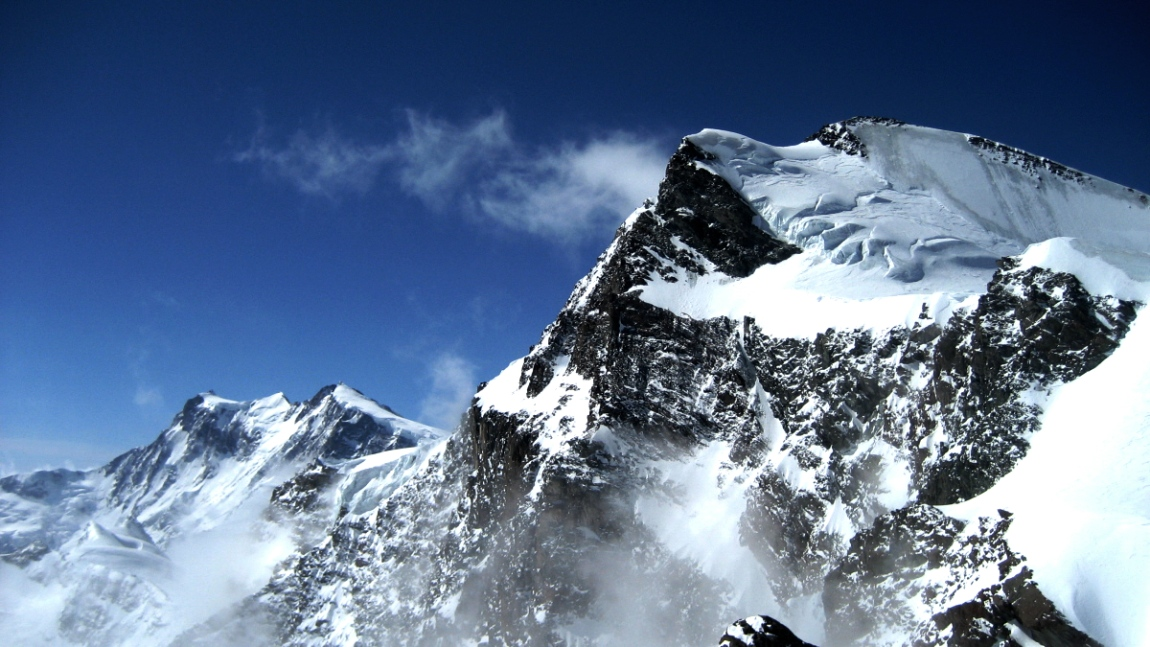
- View of the Strahlhorn from the Fluchthorn

Highest point
- Elevation: 3,795 m (12,451 ft)
- Prominence: 71 m (233 ft)
- Parent peak: Rimpfischhorn
- Coordinates: 46°1′17.2″N 7°54′52.4″E

Geography
- Location within Switzerland
- Location: Valais, Switzerland
- Parent range: Pennine Alps

The Fluchthorn is a mountain of the Swiss Pennine Alps, located south of Saas-Almagell in the canton of Valais. It lies east of the Strahlhorn.
