= Äschhorn =

Mountain in Switzerland

- Ober Äschhorn
- Location within Switzerland

Highest point
- Elevation: 3,669 m (12,037 ft)
- Prominence: 47 m (154 ft)
- Parent peak: Weisshorn
- Coordinates: 46°3′38.4″N 7°42′27.4″E

Geography
- Location: Valais, Switzerland
- Parent range: Pennine Alps

The Äschhorn is a mountain of the Pennine Alps, located north of Zermatt in Valais. The main summit (Ober Äschhorn) has an elevation of 3,669 metres while the lower summit (Unter Äschhorn) has an elevation of 3,618 metres. The Äschhorn is separated from the Zinalrothorn by the Ober Äschjoch (3,622 m).
