= Mont Durand =

Mountain in the Swiss Pennine Alps

- Arbenhorn
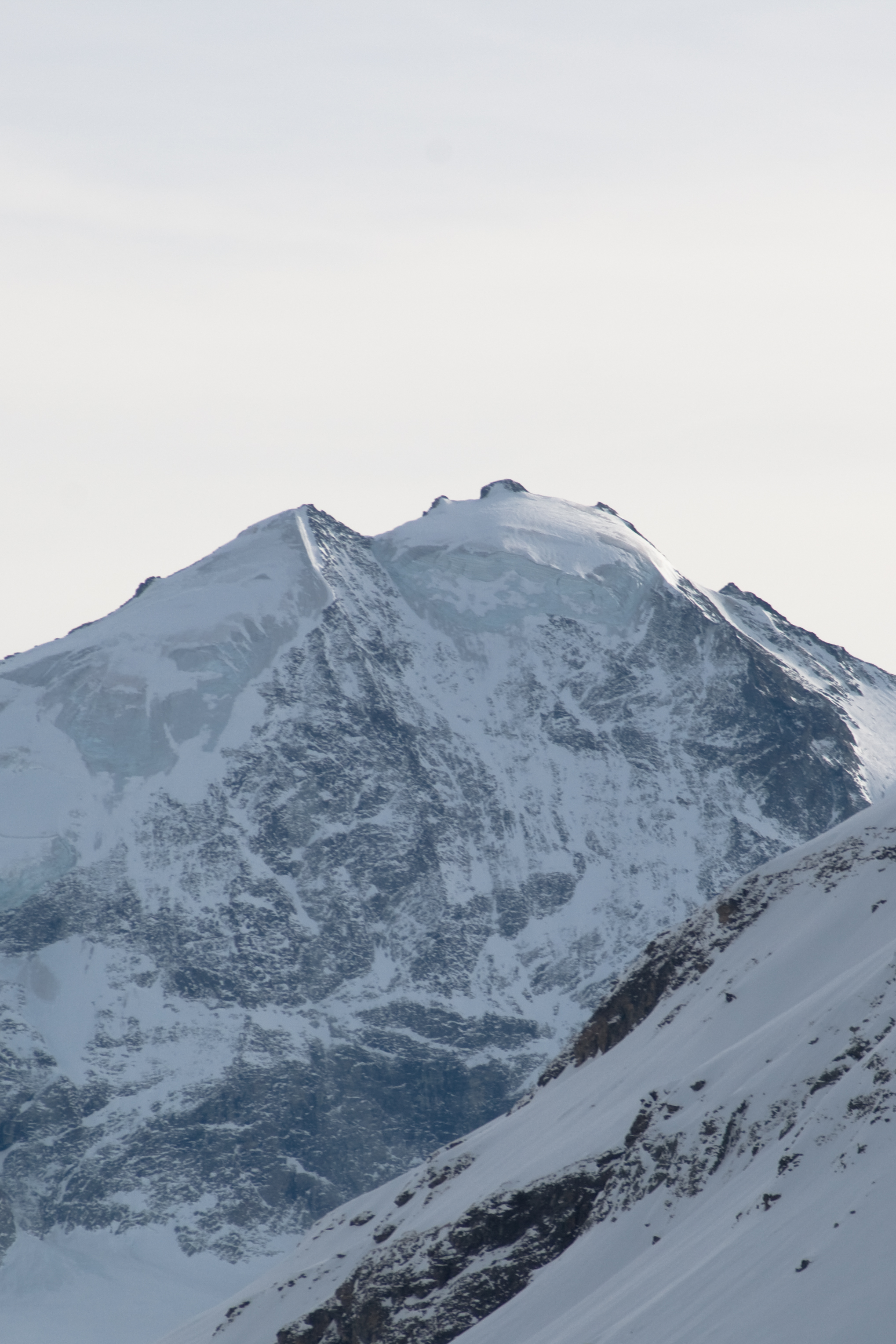
- Mont Durand north face seen from Sorebois. Left the Northeast-Top

Highest point
- Elevation: 3,713 m (12,182 ft)
- Prominence: 169 m (554 ft)
- Parent peak: Ober Gabelhorn
- Coordinates: 46°02′01.5″N 7°39′01.9″E

Geography
- Location within Switzerland
- Location: Valais, Switzerland
- Parent range: Pennine Alps

Mont Durand (or Arbenhorn) is a mountain in the Swiss Pennine Alps in the canton of Valais. It is located west of the Ober Gabelhorn between the valleys of Zinal and Zmutt. The Glacier Durand flows on its northern side before reaching the larger Zinal Glacier.

The Mont Durant has three significant sub-peaks: the northeast-top pt 3,679 m (12,070 ft), the south-top Hohwänghorn (3,671 m (12,044 ft)) and, even further south, the Äbihorn (3,473 m (11,394 ft)).
