= Tour de Boussine =

Mountain in Switzerland

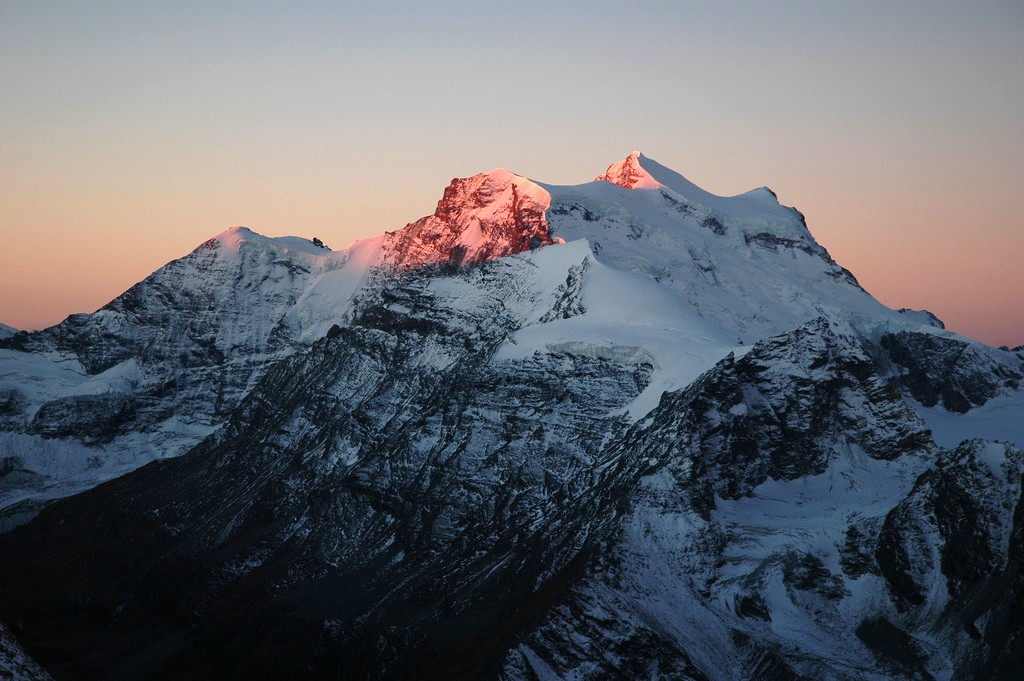
- Tour de Boussine (left) and Grand Combin (right)

Highest point
- Elevation: 3,833 m (12,575 ft)
- Prominence: 97 m (318 ft)
- Parent peak: Grand Combin
- Coordinates: 45°56′10.9″N 7°19′25.9″E

Geography
- Location within Switzerland
- Location: Valais, Switzerland
- Parent range: Pennine Alps

The Tour de Boussine is a mountain of the Swiss Pennine Alps, overlooking the lake of Mauvoisin in the canton of Valais. It lies east of the Grand Combin.
