= Pointe Kurz =

Mountain in Switzerland

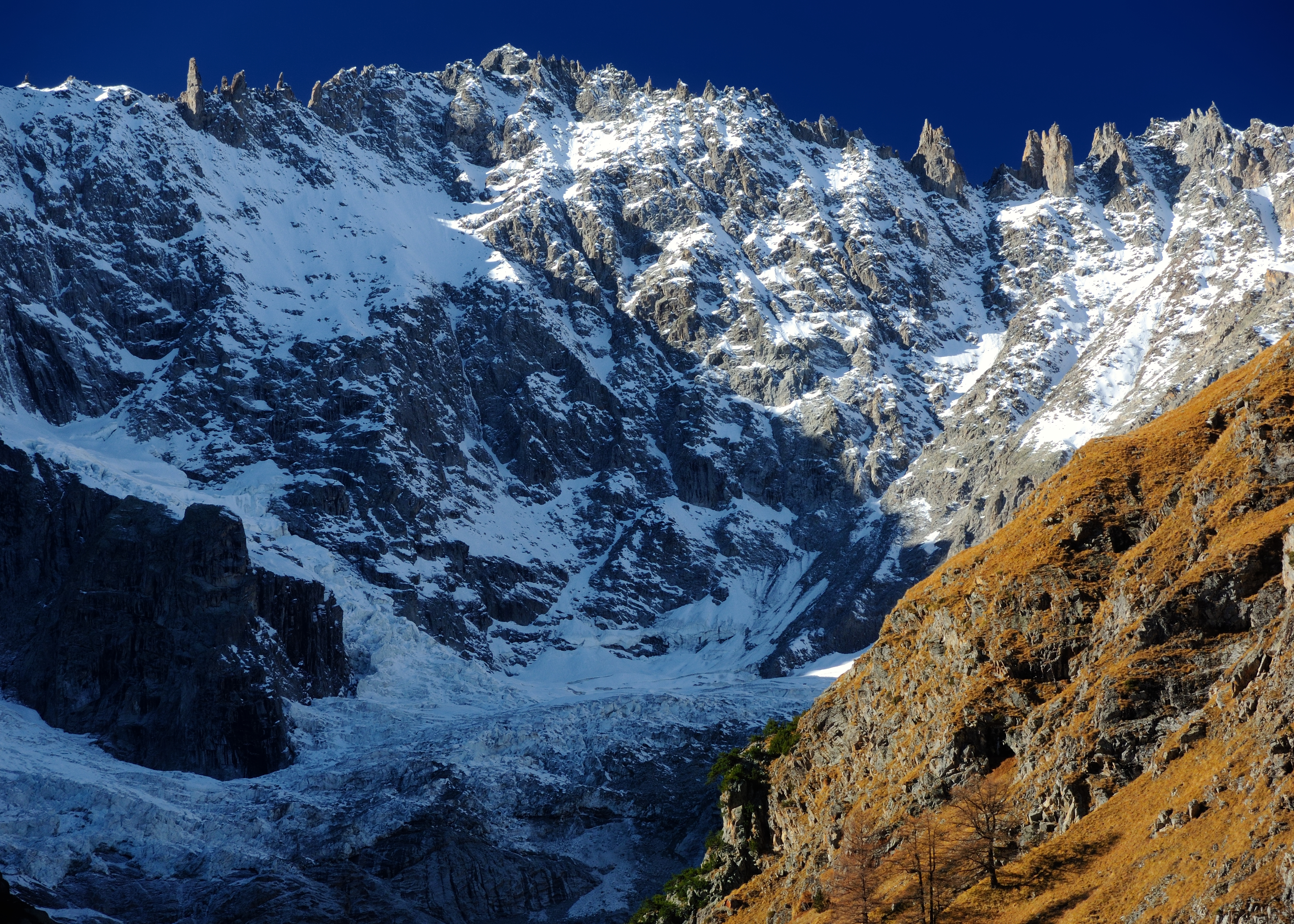
- The east side. The Grand Gendarme on the left, the Pointe Morin on the right

Highest point
- Elevation: 3,677 m (12,064 ft)
- Prominence: 169 m (554 ft)
- Parent peak: Aiguille d'Argentière
- Coordinates: 45°56′18″N 7°02′07.5″E

Geography
- Location within Alps
- Location: Valais, Switzerland; Haute-Savoie, France
- Parent range: Mont Blanc Massif

Pointe Kurz (3,677 m) is a mountain of the Mont Blanc Massif, located on the border between France and Switzerland. It lies between the glaciers of Argentière and L'A Neuve, west of La Fouly, the closest locality.

The Pointe Kurz is the highest summit of the Aiguilles Rouges du Dolent, a small range situated between the Tour Noir and Mont Dolent. Other important summits of the Aiguilles Rouges du Dolent are: north of the Pointe Kurz the Pointe Morin (3587 m); south of the Pointe Kurz the Grand Gendarme (depending on the map between 3598 m and 3600 m), the Pointe de la Fouly (3608 m) and the Aiguille de l'Amône (3585 m).

== See also ==
- List of mountains of Switzerland named after people
