= Combin de Valsorey =

Mountain in Switzerland

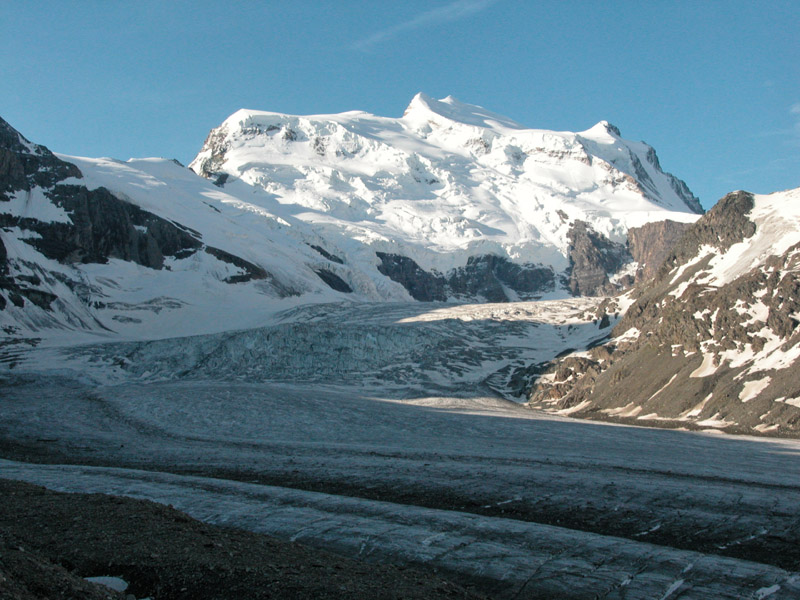
- Combin de Valsorey (right peak)

Highest point
- Elevation: 4,184 m (13,727 ft)
- Prominence: 57 m (187 ft)
- Parent peak: Grand Combin
- Isolation: 0.44 km (0.27 mi)
- Coordinates: 45°56′17″N 7°17′26″E

Geography
- Location within Switzerland
- Location: Switzerland
- Parent range: Pennine Alps

The Combin de Valsorey is the second highest summit in the Grand Combin massif.
