= Testa del Leone =

Mountain in Switzerland

- Tête du Lion
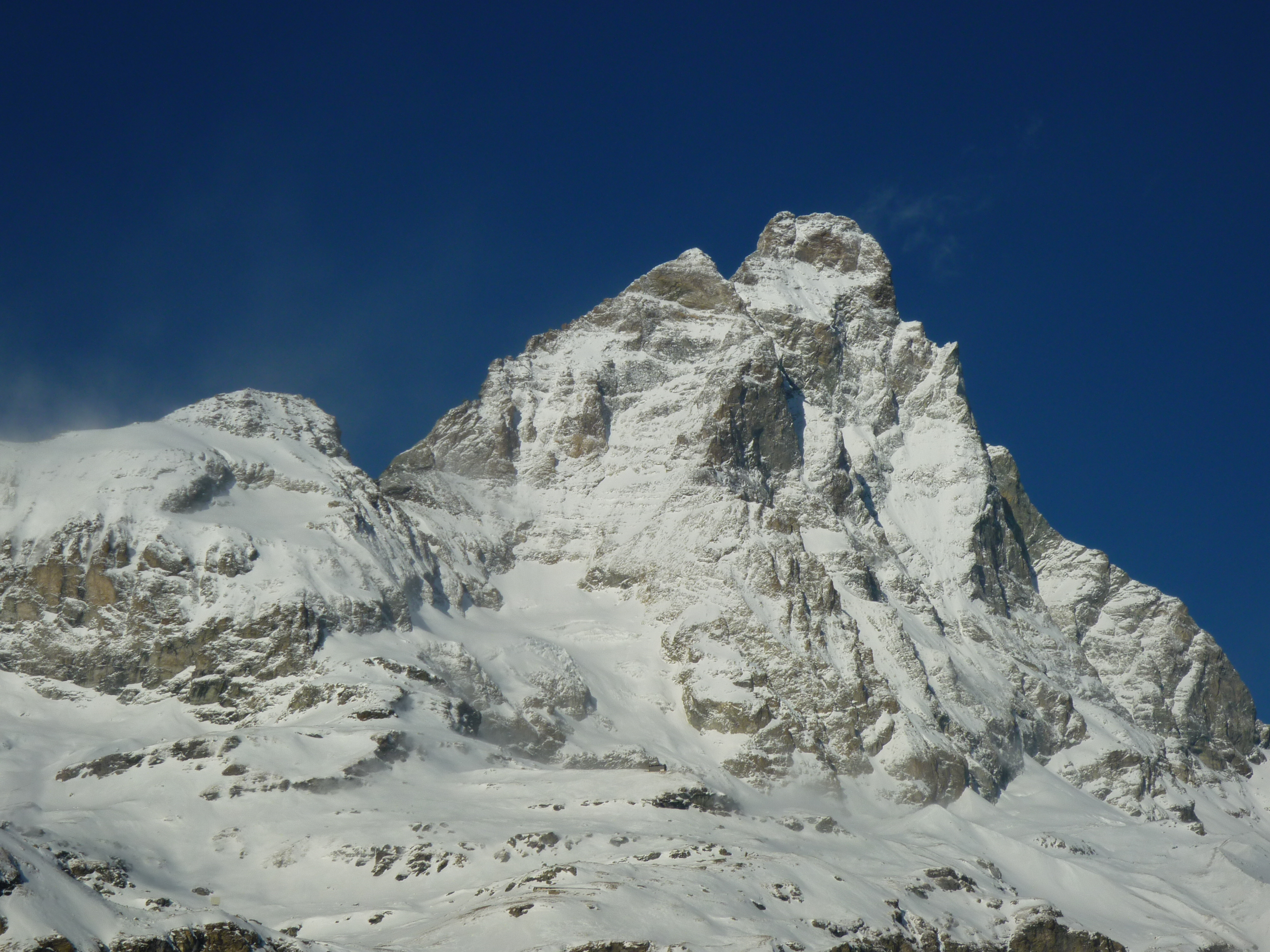
- Testa del Leone (left) and the Matterhorn, from the south side

Highest point
- Elevation: 3,715 m (12,188 ft)
- Prominence: 135 m (443 ft)
- Parent peak: Matterhorn
- Coordinates: 45°58′16″N 7°38′36″E

Geography
- Location within Alps
- Location: Valais, Switzerland; Aosta Valley, Italy
- Parent range: Pennine Alps

The Testa del Leone (French : Tête du Lion, lit. "lion head") (3,715 m) is a mountain of the Pennine Alps, located on the border between Switzerland and Italy. It lies on the main Alpine watershed, west of the Matterhorn.
