= Bigerhorn =

Mountain in Switzerland

- Gross Bigerhorn
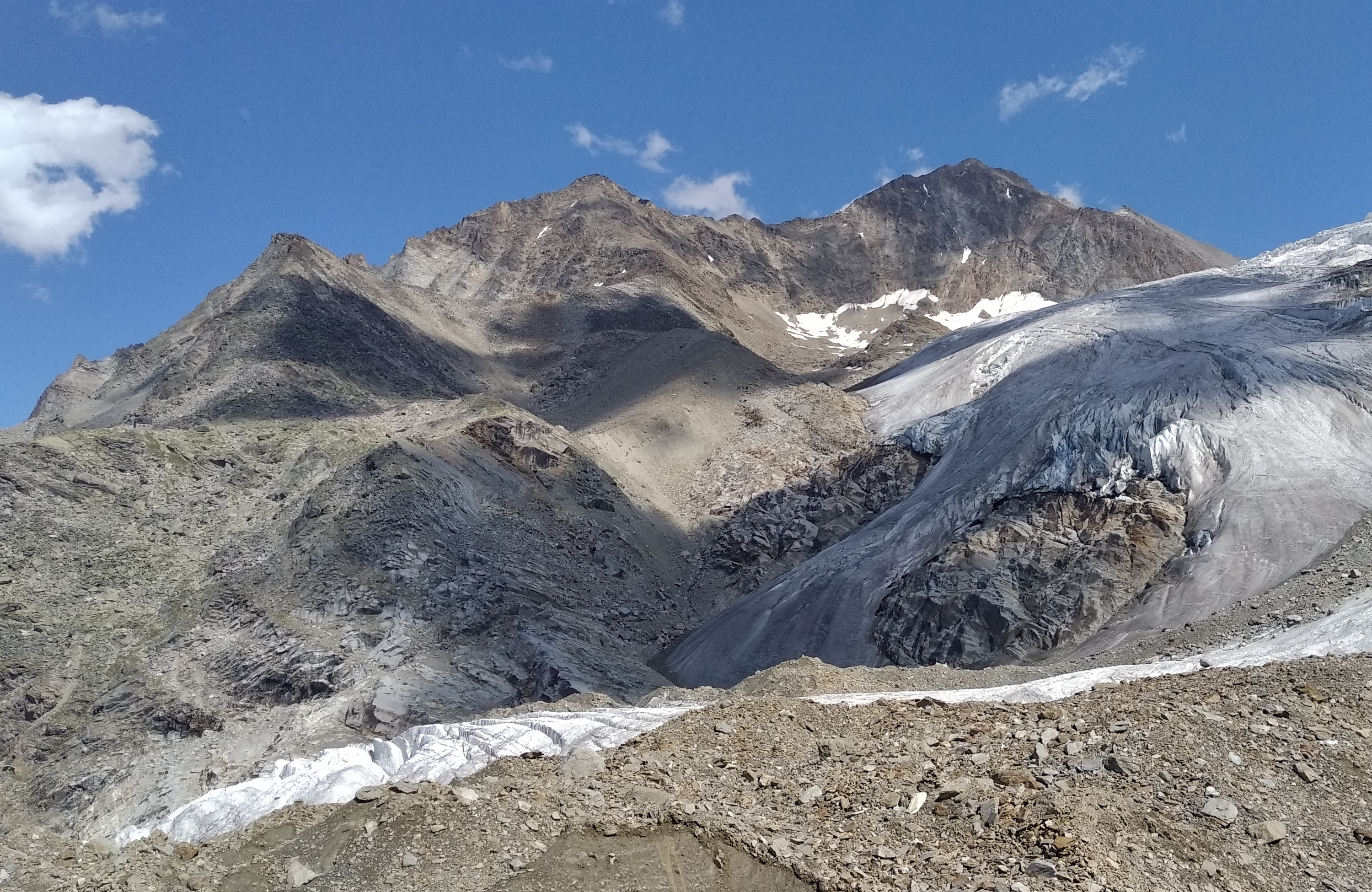
- From left to right: Klein Bigerhorn, Gross Bigerhorn and Balfrin. In the foreground: Riedgletscher.

Highest point
- Elevation: 3,626 m (11,896 ft)
- Prominence: 32 m (105 ft)
- Parent peak: Balfrin
- Coordinates: 46°8′42.3″N 7°52′13.9″E

Geography
- Location within Switzerland
- Location: Valais, Switzerland
- Parent range: Pennine Alps

Climbing
- Easiest route: From Bordier Hut, trail to the summit

The Bigerhorn (3,626 m) is a mountain of the Swiss Pennine Alps, located south of Grächen in the canton of Valais. It lies in the Mischabel range, north of the Ried Glacier.

From the Bordier Hut, a trail leads to the summit of the Bigerhorn.
