= Geisshorn =

Mountain in Switzerland

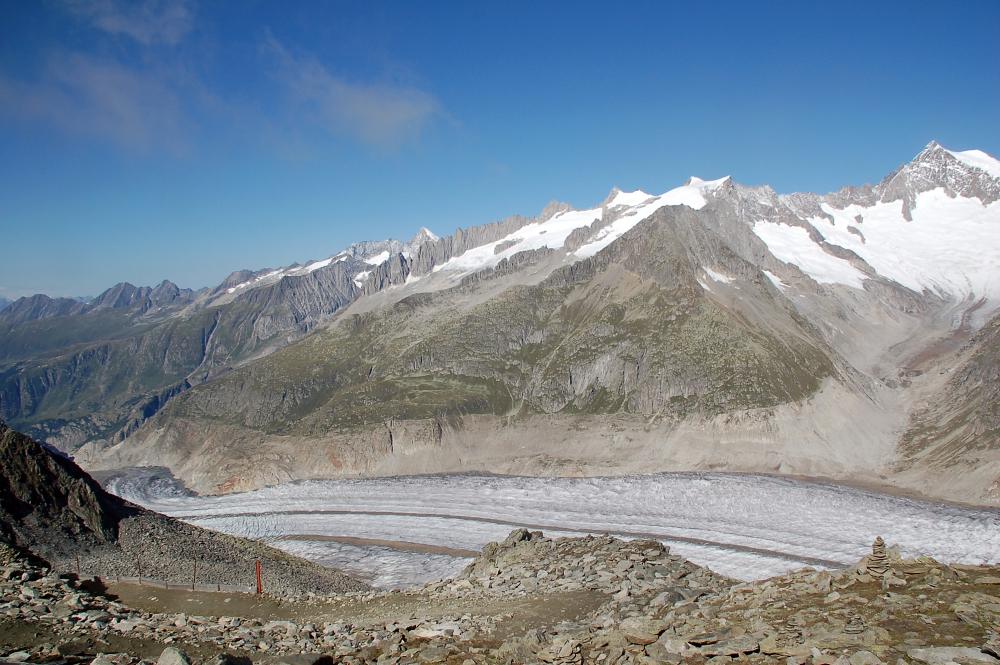
- Geisshorn (center right) and Aletschhorn (right), above the Aletsch Glacier

Highest point
- Elevation: 3,740 m (12,270 ft)
- Prominence: 158 m (518 ft)
- Parent peak: Aletschhorn
- Coordinates: 46°26′27.7″N 8°0′20.5″E

Geography
- Location within Switzerland
- Location: Valais, Switzerland
- Parent range: Bernese Alps

The Geisshorn is a mountain of the Bernese Alps, overlooking the Aletsch Glacier in the canton of Valais. Together with its Northeast-Summit Sattelhorn (3724 m), it appears as a Doublepeak. Northwest of the Sattelhorn, the slightly lower ridge of the Vorderes Geisshorn (3632 m) leads to the south-ridge of the Aletschhorn.
