= L'Evêque =

Mountain in Switzerland

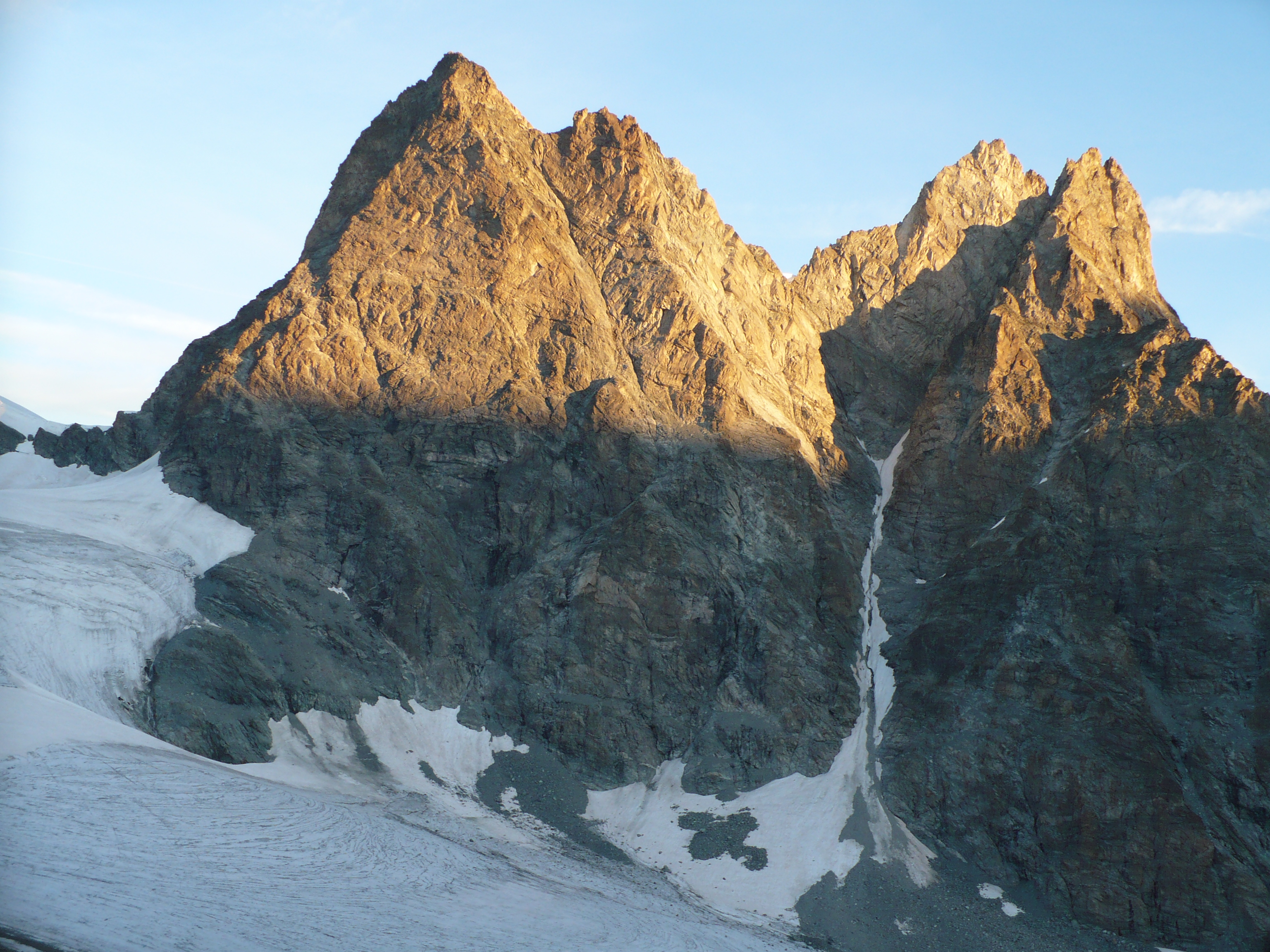
- L'Evêque (left) and Mitre de L'Evêque (right) from the east side

Highest point
- Elevation: 3,716 m (12,192 ft)
- Prominence: 642 m (2,106 ft)
- Parent peak: Monte Rosa
- Listing: Alpine mountains above 3000 m
- Coordinates: 45°57′52″N 7°30′10″E

Geography
- Location within Switzerland
- Location: Valais, Switzerland
- Parent range: Pennine Alps

L'Evêque is a mountain of the Pennine Alps, overlooking the Col Collon in the canton of Valais, south of Mont Collon. With a height of 3,716 meters above sea level, it is one of the highest summits in the Arolla valley. Together with the not much lower double-peaked Mitre de l'Evêque (3,653 m), L'Evêque builds a very prominent double tower.

== See also ==
- List of mountains of Switzerland
