= Klein Lauteraarhorn =

Mountain in Switzerland

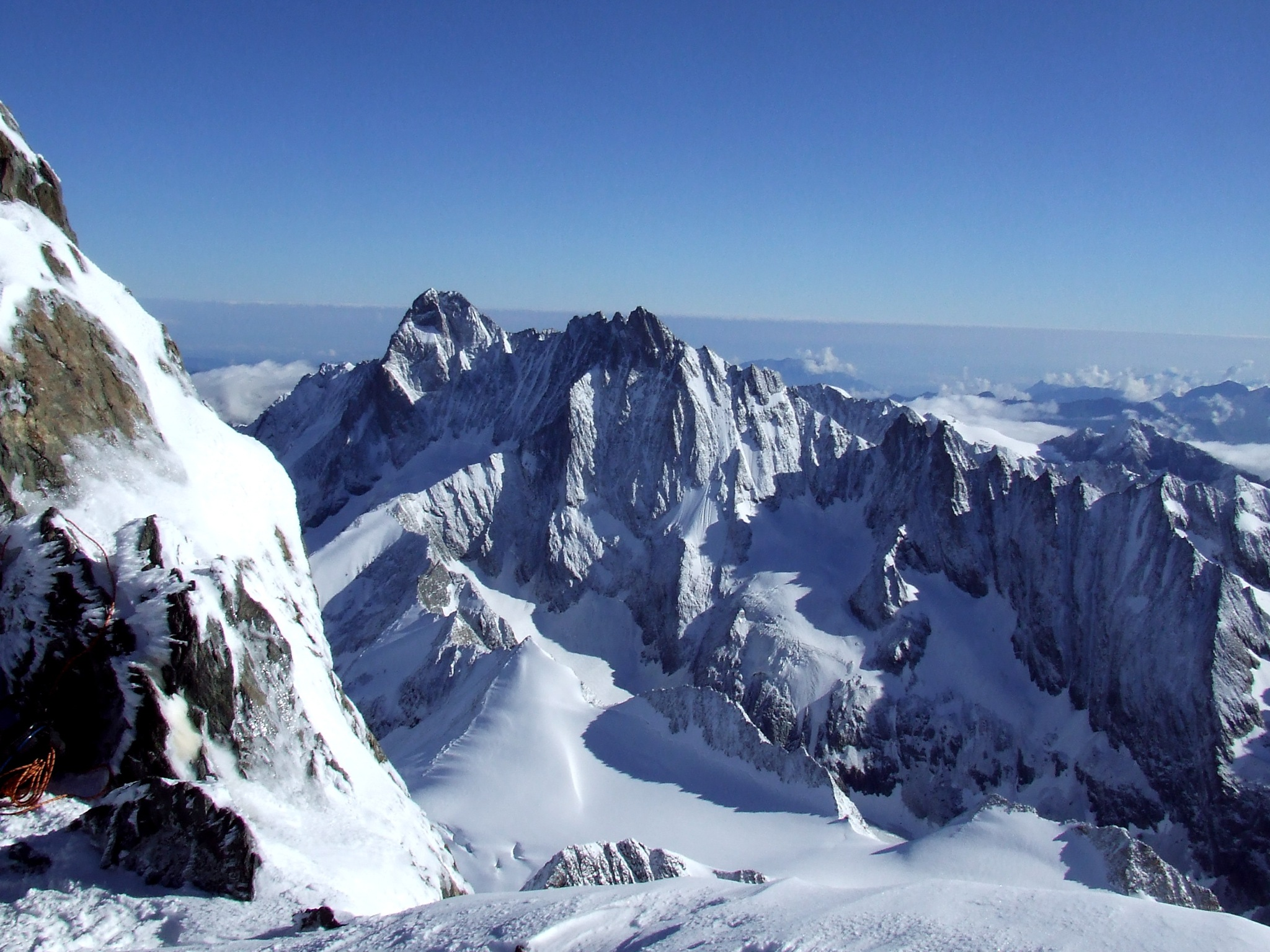
- Lauteraarhorn (centre) and Klein Lauteraarhorn (centre right) from the west side

Highest point
- Elevation: 3,738 m (12,264 ft)
- Prominence: 117 m (384 ft)
- Parent peak: Schreckhorn
- Coordinates: 46°34′44.2″N 8°8′21.3″E

Geography
- Location within Switzerland
- Location: Bern, Switzerland
- Parent range: Bernese Alps

Climbing
- Easiest route: rock/snow climb

The Klein Lauteraarhorn (3,738 m) is a peak of the Bernese Alps, overlooking the Unteraar Glacier in the canton of Bern. It lies south of the Lauteraarhorn, on the range separating the Strahlegg Glacier from the Lauteraar Glacier, both tributaries of the Unteraar Glacier.

The summits of the Klein Lauteraarhorn are (from northwest to southeast): main-summit pt 3738; south-top (double-tower), not measured; lower southeast-top pt 3648; double-gendarme pt 3626.

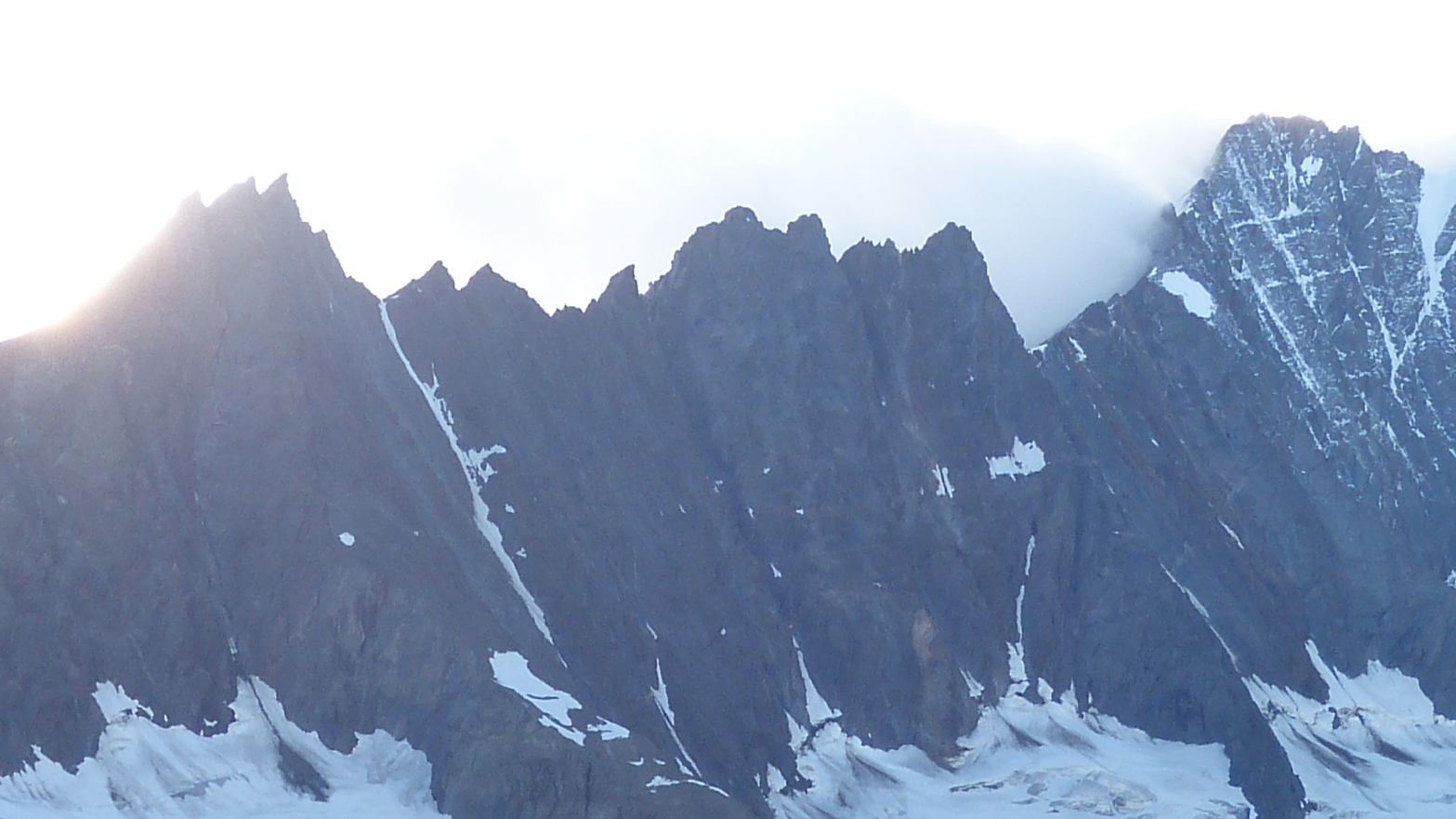
From left: Hugihorn, double-gendarme pt 3626, lower southeast-top pt 3648, south-top (double-tower), Klein Lauteraarhorn/main-top, Lauteraarhorn
