= Besso (mountain) =

Mountain in Switzerland

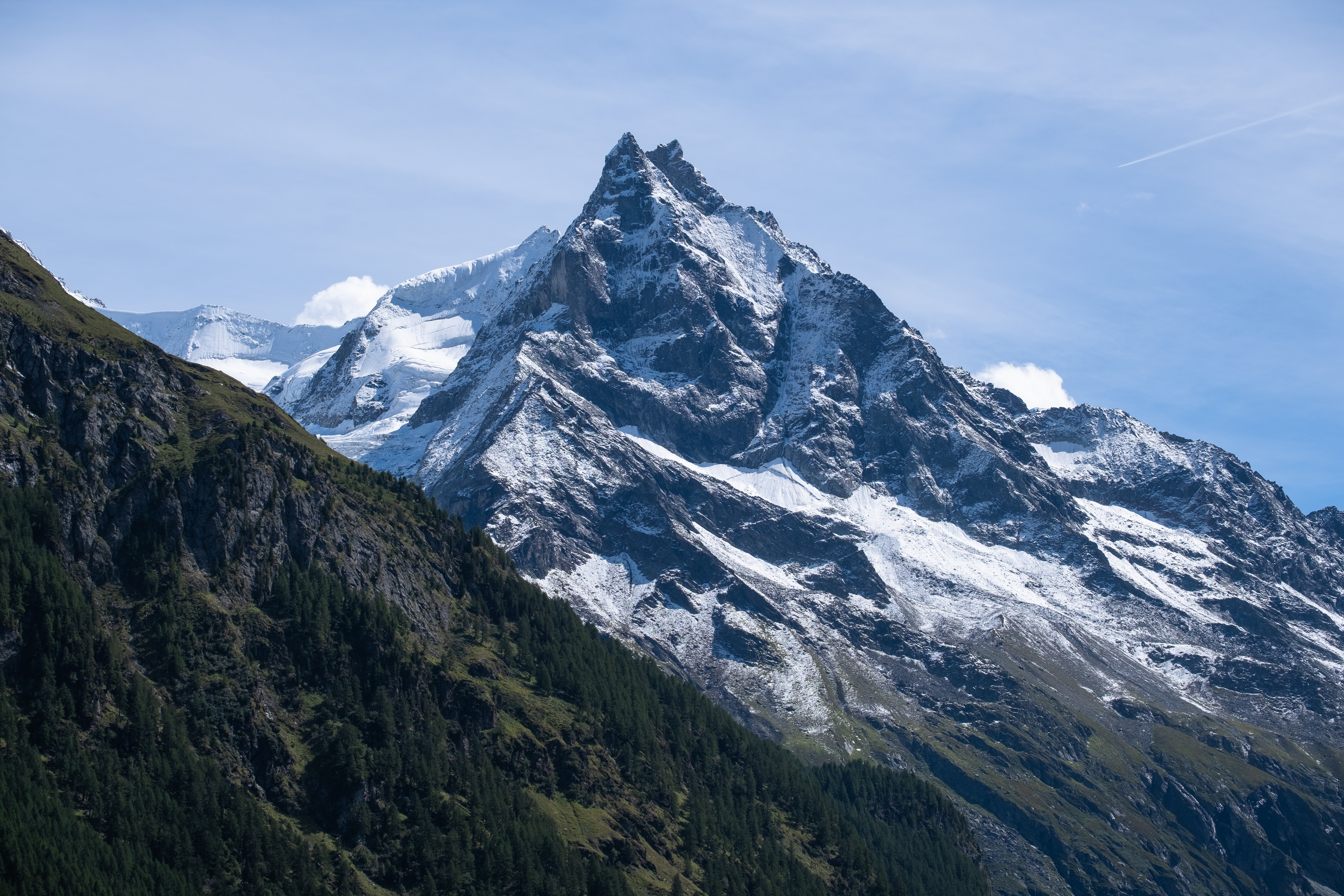
- Besso from the Corne de Sorebois

Highest point
- Elevation: 3,669 m (12,037 ft)
- Prominence: 151 m (495 ft)
- Parent peak: Weisshorn
- Coordinates: 46°4′39.43″N 7°39′31.5″E

Geography
- Location within Switzerland
- Location: Valais, Switzerland
- Parent range: Pennine Alps

Climbing
- First ascent: c. 1862 by J. B. Epinay and J. Vianin
- Easiest route: South flank and south-east ridge (F)

Besso is a mountain in the Pennine Alps in the Swiss canton of Valais. It has two significant summits: the main summit (3,669 m (12,037 ft)) and the north-top (3,659 m (12,005 ft)).

The name Besso means "twins" in the dialect of the Val d'Anniviers and refers to the twin summits of the mountain.

The first ascent of the mountain was probably made by the guides J. B. Épinay and J. Vianin in 1862. The classic route on the mountain – the south-west ridge (PD+) – was, according to Collomb, "possibly" first climbed by R. L. G. Irving and party in 1906.

The Mountet hut (2,886 m) is used for the normal route, which is known as the "Ladies' Route".
