= Le Boudri =

Mountain in Switzerland

- Burgihorn
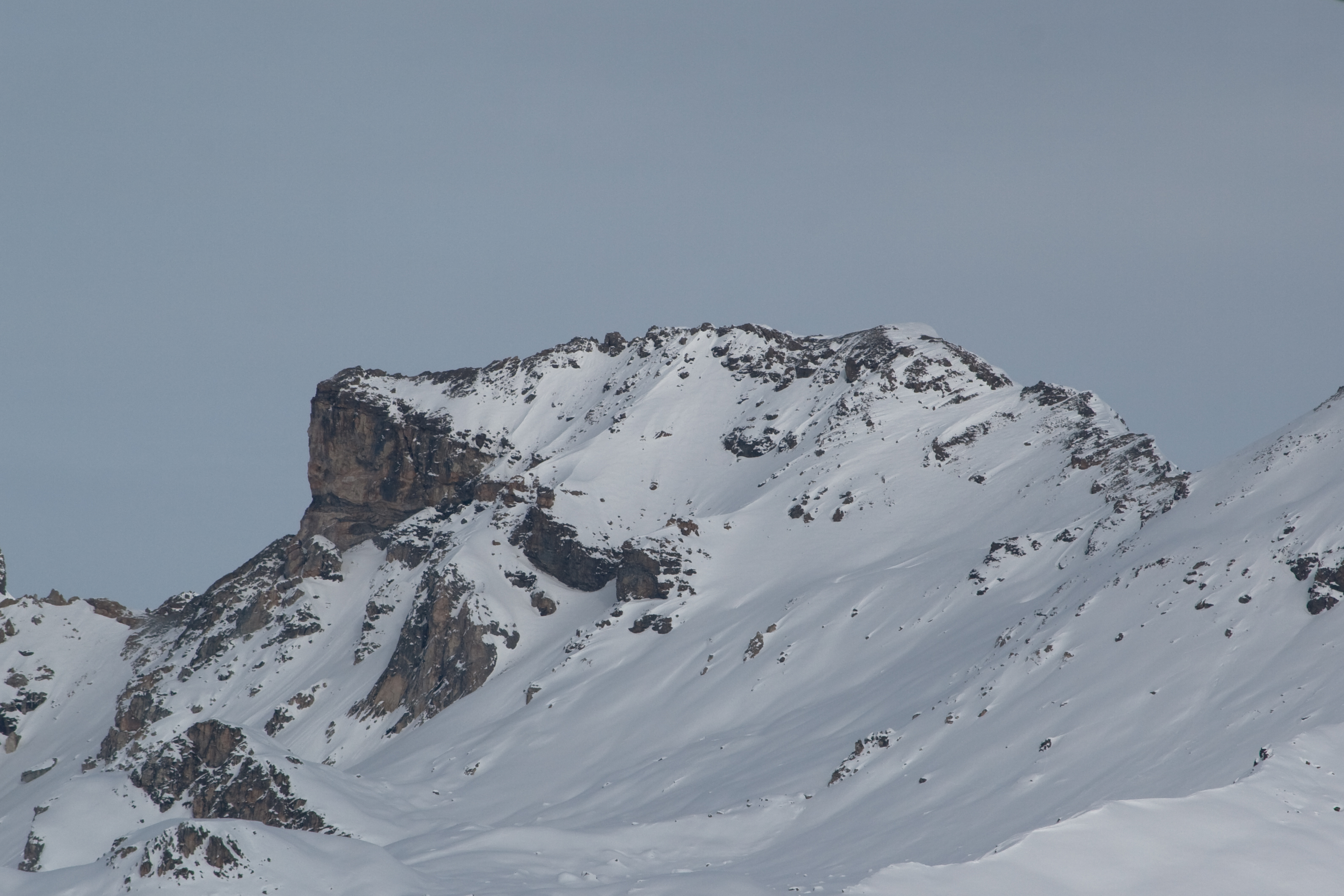
- View from the Corne de Sorebois (west side)

Highest point
- Elevation: 3,070 m (10,070 ft)
- Prominence: 100 m (330 ft)
- Parent peak: Hirsihorn
- Coordinates: 46°11′33.6″N 7°39′31.8″E

Geography
- Location within Switzerland
- Location: Valais, Switzerland
- Parent range: Pennine Alps

Le Boudri (also known as Burgihorn) is a mountain of the Swiss Pennine Alps, located east of Ayer in the canton of Valais. It lies between the valleys of Anniviers and Turtmann, north of the Hirsihorn.
