= Pointes de Mourti =

Mountain in Switzerland

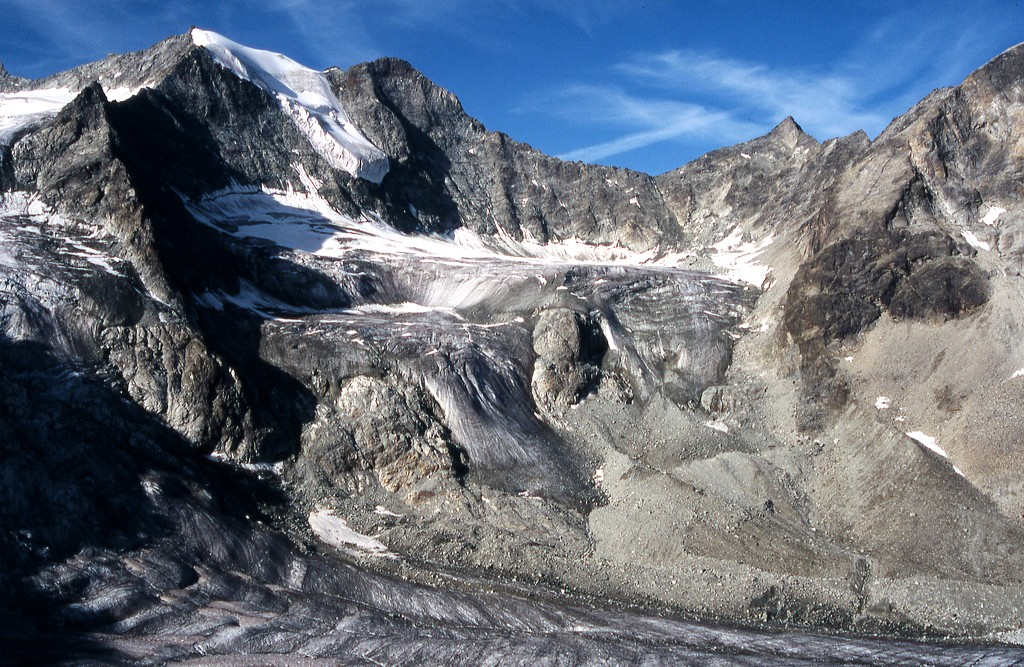
- The Pointes du Mourti (left) from Moiry

Highest point
- Elevation: 3,564 m (11,693 ft)
- Prominence: 66 m (217 ft)
- Parent peak: Dent Blanche
- Coordinates: 46°04′21″N 7°35′9.5″E

Geography
- Location within Switzerland
- Location: Valais, Switzerland
- Parent range: Pennine Alps

The Pointes de Mourti are a mountain of the Swiss Pennine Alps, overlooking the glacier of Moiry in the canton of Valais. They lie north of the Pointe de Bricola, on the range that separates the valley of Hérens from the valley of Moiry (part of the Anniviers valley).

The (main) eastern summit has an elevation of 3,564 metres while the western summit has an elevation of 3,529 metres.

The closest locality is Salay on the west side of the mountain, although the Pointes du Mourti are usually climbed from the Moiry hut on their eastern side.
