= Bec de la Montau =

Mountain in Switzerland

- Location within Switzerland

Highest point
- Elevation: 2,922 m (9,587 ft)
- Prominence: 95 m (312 ft)
- Coordinates: 46°07′44″N 7°20′51″E

Geography
- Location: Valais, Switzerland
- Parent range: Pennine Alps

The Bec de la Montau is a mountain of the Pennine Alps, located south of Nendaz in the Swiss canton of Valais. It lies on the range that separates the Val de Nendaz from the Val d'Hérémence, which culminates at Le Métailler.
