= Lammenhorn =

Mountain in Switzerland

- Location within Switzerland

Highest point
- Elevation: 3,190 m (10,470 ft)
- Prominence: 61 m (200 ft)
- Coordinates: 46°9′16.3″N 7°53′40.3″E

Geography
- Location: Valais, Switzerland
- Parent range: Pennine Alps

The Lammenhorn is a mountain of the Swiss Pennine Alps, overlooking Saas-Balen in the canton of Valais. It lies north of the Balfrin, within the valley of Saas.
