= Festihorn =

Mountain in Switzerland

- Location within Switzerland

Highest point
- Elevation: 3,248 m (10,656 ft)
- Prominence: 134 m (440 ft)
- Coordinates: 46°10′35.5″N 07°45′24″E

Geography
- Location: Valais, Switzerland
- Parent range: Pennine Alps

The Festihorn is a mountain of the Swiss Pennine Alps, located west of St. Niklaus in the canton of Valais. It lies on the range south of the Jungtal, between the Sparruhorn and the Wasuhorn.
