= Pointe de Bricola =

Mountain in Switzerland

- Location within Switzerland

Highest point
- Elevation: 3,658 m (12,001 ft)
- Prominence: 68 m (223 ft)
- Parent peak: Grand Cornier
- Coordinates: 46°03′45″N 7°35′30″E

Geography
- Location: Valais, Switzerland
- Parent range: Pennine Alps

The Pointe de Bricola is a mountain of the Swiss Pennine Alps, located south of Les Haudères in the canton of Valais. The south and west side are rocky, whilst the east side is covered by the Moiry Glacier, which is used as the main point of access.

Among the mountains exceeding 3000m in height, the Pointe de Bricola is considered a rather easy climb.
