= Sex de Marinda =

Mountain in Switzerland

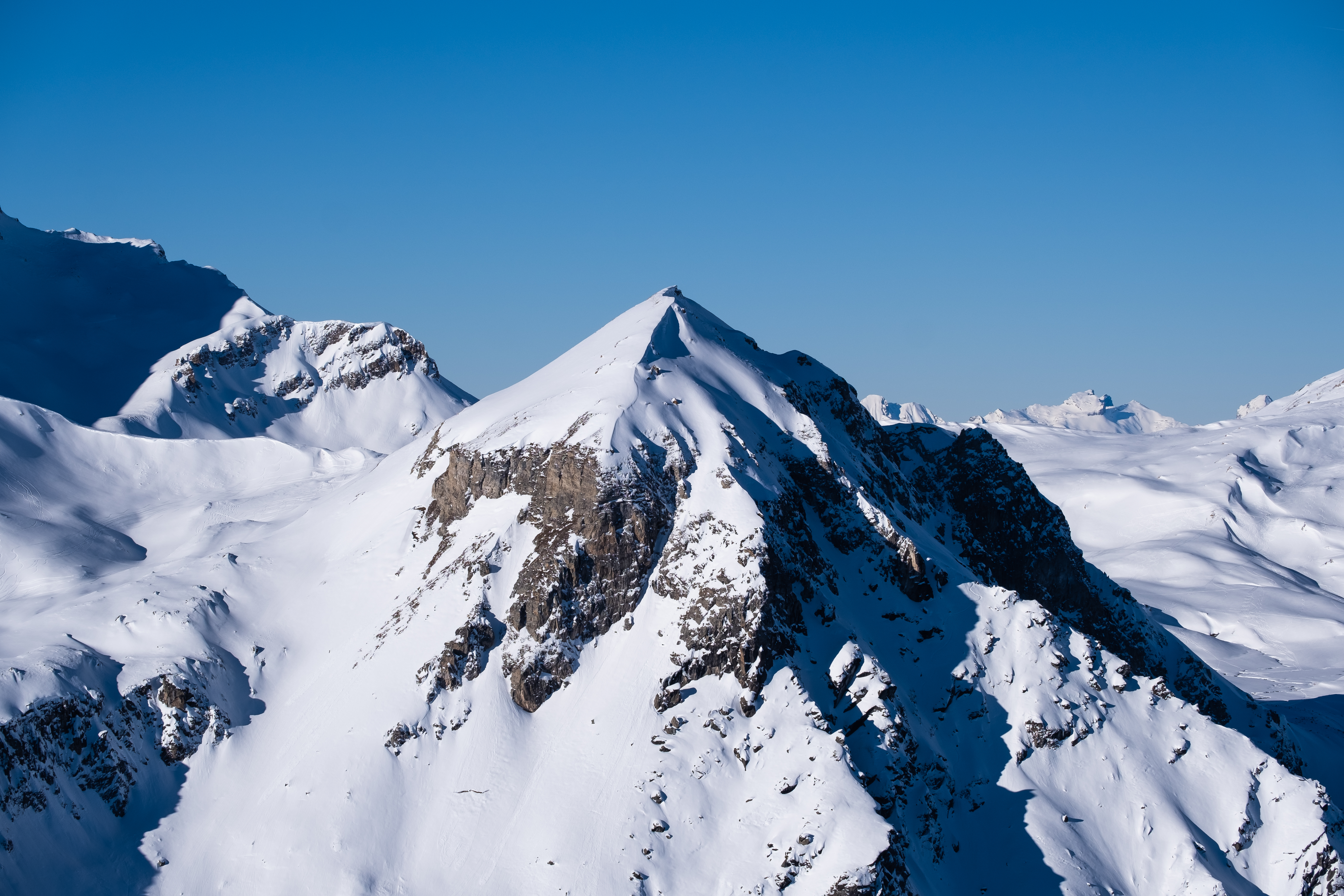
- Sex de Marinda from the Corne de Sorebois

Highest point
- Elevation: 2,906 m (9,534 ft)
- Prominence: 114 m (374 ft)
- Coordinates: 46°8′58.9″N 7°33′5.2″E

Geography
- Location within Switzerland
- Location: Valais, Switzerland
- Parent range: Pennine Alps

The Sex de Marinda is a mountain of the Swiss Pennine Alps, located south of Grimentz in the canton of Valais. It lies east of the Sasseneire, 90 km (56 mi) south of capital Bern. The peak level is 2,906 meters (9,534 ft) above the sea level, 117 meters (384 ft) above the surrounding terrain. Width at its peak's base is 0.55 km (0.34 mi).

Terrain near Sex de Marinda is mountainous. The highest point nearby is Sasseneire, 3,254 meters (10,676 ft) above sea level, 2.3 km (1.4 mi) southwest of Sex de Marinda.
