= Schalihorn =

Mountain in Switzerland

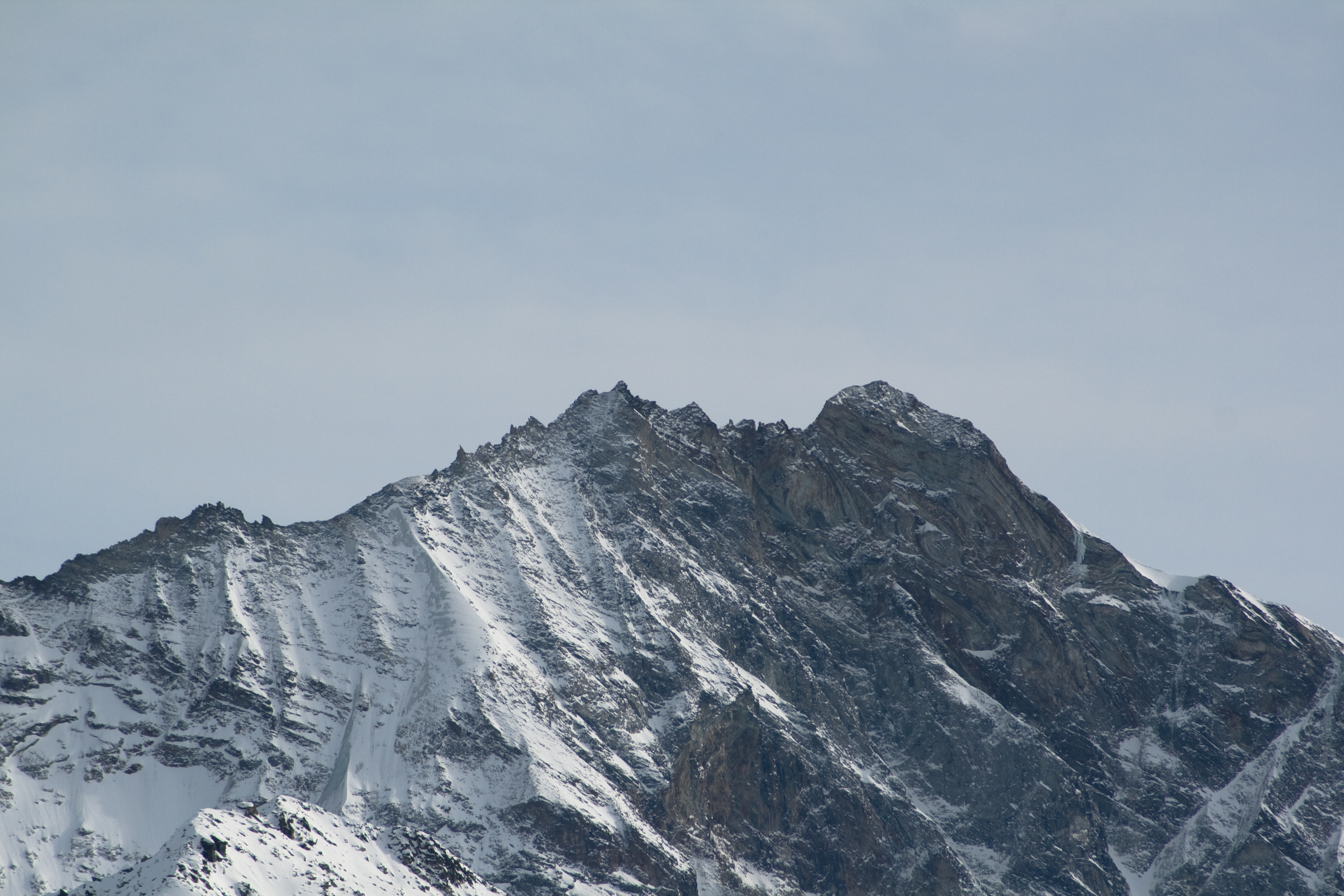
- The west face seen from Sorebois. Main-top right, north-top in the center.

Highest point
- Elevation: 3,975 m (13,041 ft)
- Prominence: 225 m (738 ft)
- Parent peak: Weisshorn
- Coordinates: 46°05′04″N 7°42′18″E

Geography
- Location within Switzerland
- Location: Valais, Switzerland
- Parent range: Pennine Alps

The Schalihorn (3,975 m) is a mountain of the Swiss Pennine Alps, located between Zinal and Täsch in the canton of Valais. It is separated from the Zinalrothorn by the Moming Pass (3,777 m) and from the Weisshorn by the Schalijoch (3,750 m). The Schalihorn has a prominent north-peak (3954 m).
