= Lac de la Bayenna =

Lake in Valais, Switzerland

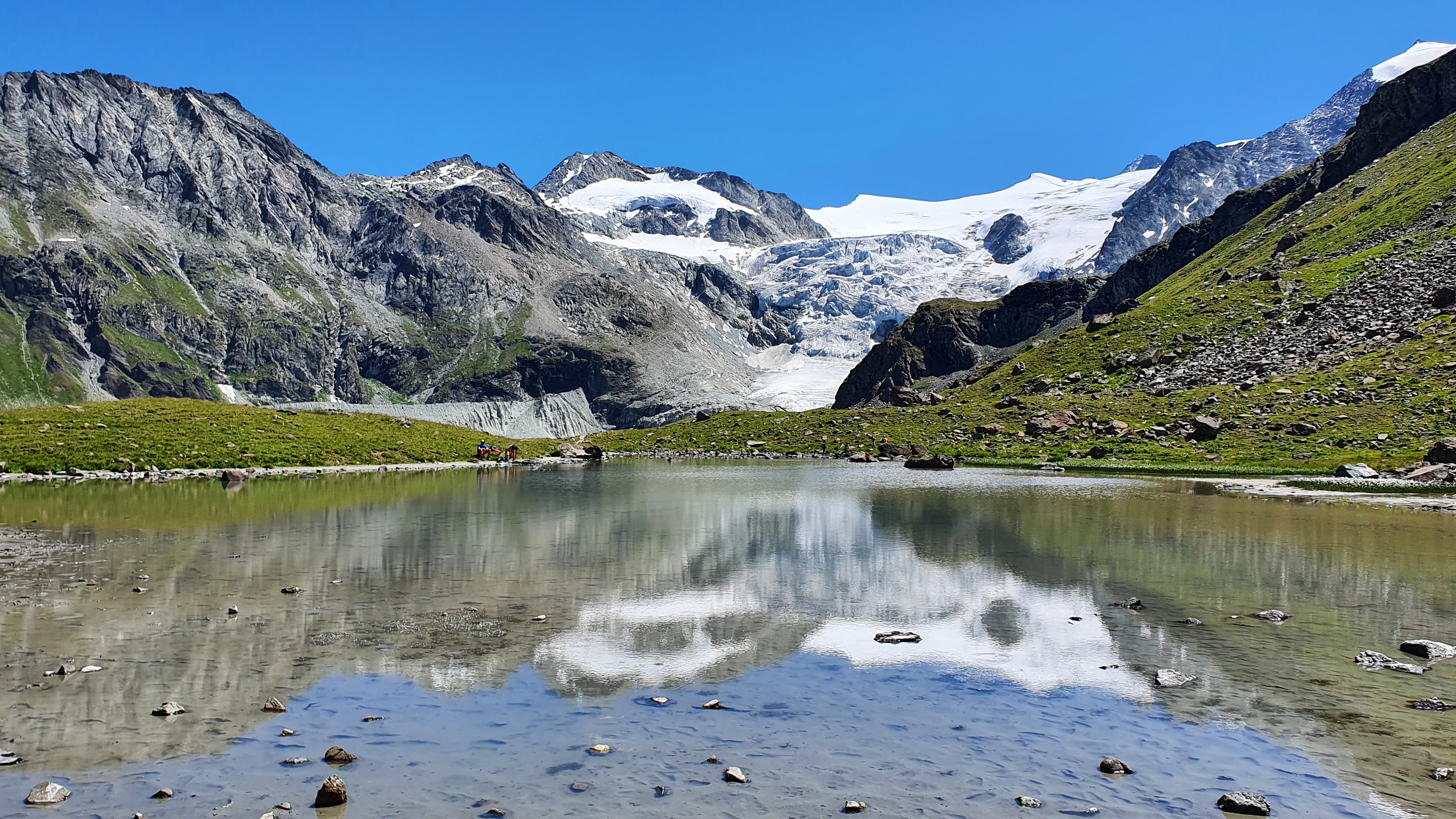
- Lac de la Bayenna and Moiry Glacier

- Location within Canton of Valais Location within Switzerland Location within Alps
- Interactive map of Lac de la Bayenna
- Location: Anniviers, Valais
- Coordinates: 46.10235°N 7.57281°E
- Primary outflows: tributary to the Gougra
- Basin countries: Switzerland
- Surface elevation: 2,546 m (8,353 ft)

Lac de la Bayenna is a mountain lake in the Val de Moiry, a side valley of the Val d'Anniviers, on the territory of the municipality of Anniviers in the Swiss canton of Valais. It lies at 2,546 m (8,353 ft) west of Lac de Châteaupré above the glacier forelands of Moiry Glacier. Its outlet flows into the Gougra river after about 800 m slightly below Lac de Châteaupré.

== Accessibility ==
The lake can be reached on a mountain hiking trail in about 30 minutes from Lac de Châteaupré, which is accessible by public transport.

Lac de la Bayenna is located on the circular hiking trail around Lac de Moiry (Tour du Lac de Moiry). In addition, the mountain trail to the mountain pass Col du Tsaté (2,867 m (9,406 ft)), a crossing into the Val d'Hérens, passes the lake.
