= Frilihorn =

Mountain in Switzerland

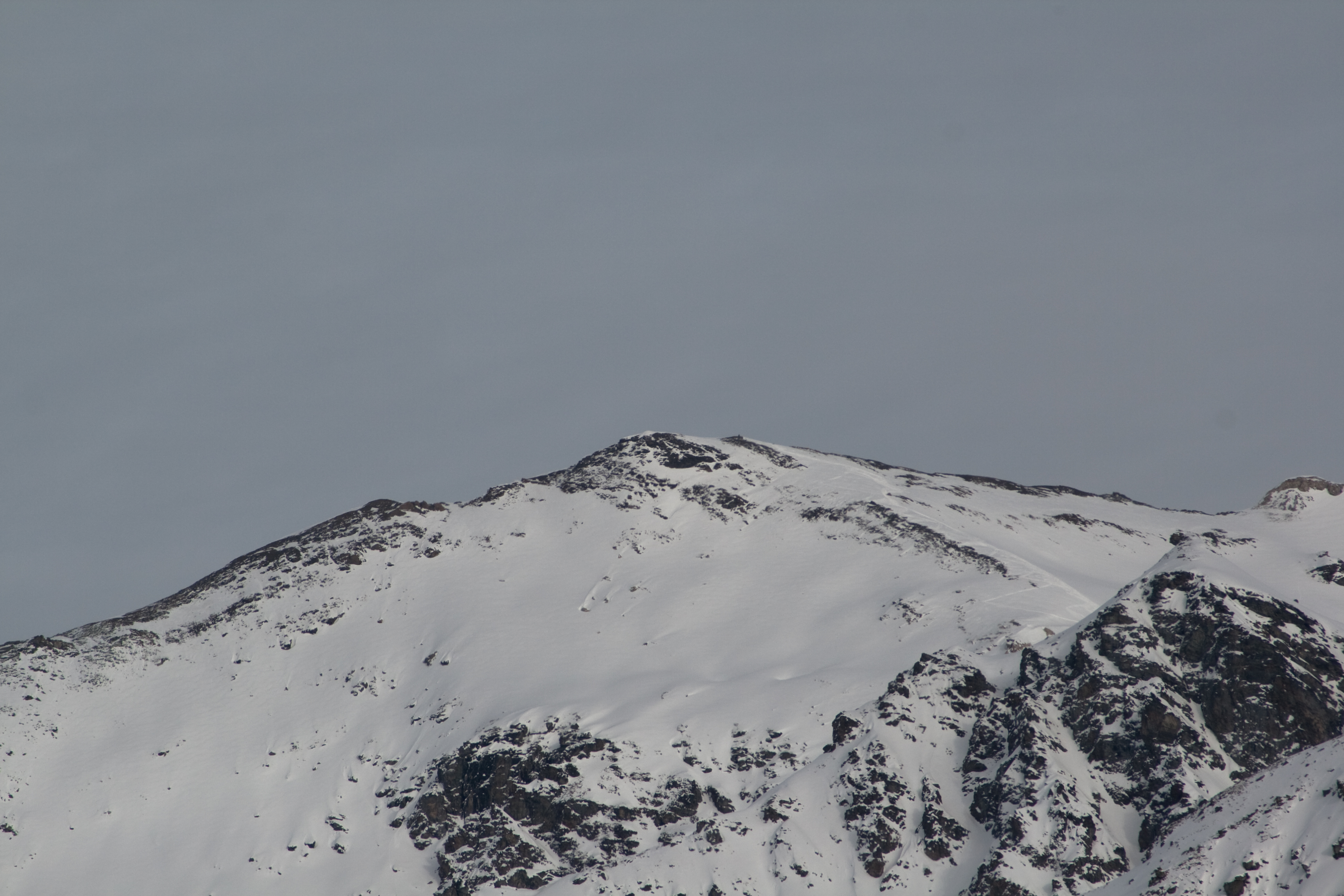
- View from Sorebois (west side)

Highest point
- Elevation: 3,124 m (10,249 ft)
- Coordinates: 46°10′4.8″N 7°40′17.3″E

Geography
- Location within Switzerland
- Location: Valais, Switzerland
- Parent range: Pennine Alps

The Frilihorn is a mountain of the Swiss Pennine Alps, located between the Val d'Anniviers and the Turtmanntal in the canton of Valais.

The Frilihorn rises to a height of 10,249 ft (3,124 m), making it the 758th highest mountain in Switzerland. It is located east of Ayer and south of Gruben. It sits to the north of Wängerhorn peak, south of Minugrat peak and south east of L'Omen Roso peak.
