= Crêta de Vella =

Mountain in Switzerland

- Location within Switzerland

Highest point
- Elevation: 2,519 m (8,264 ft)
- Prominence: 24 m (79 ft)
- Parent peak: La Tsavre
- Coordinates: 45°57′35.5″N 7°10′25.1″E

Geography
- Location: Valais, Switzerland
- Parent range: Pennine Alps

The Crêta de Vella is a mountain of the Swiss Pennine Alps, located south of Liddes in the canton of Valais. It lies at the northern end of the chain separating the Comba de l'A from the main valley of Entremont.
