= Tällihorn =

Mountain in Switzerland

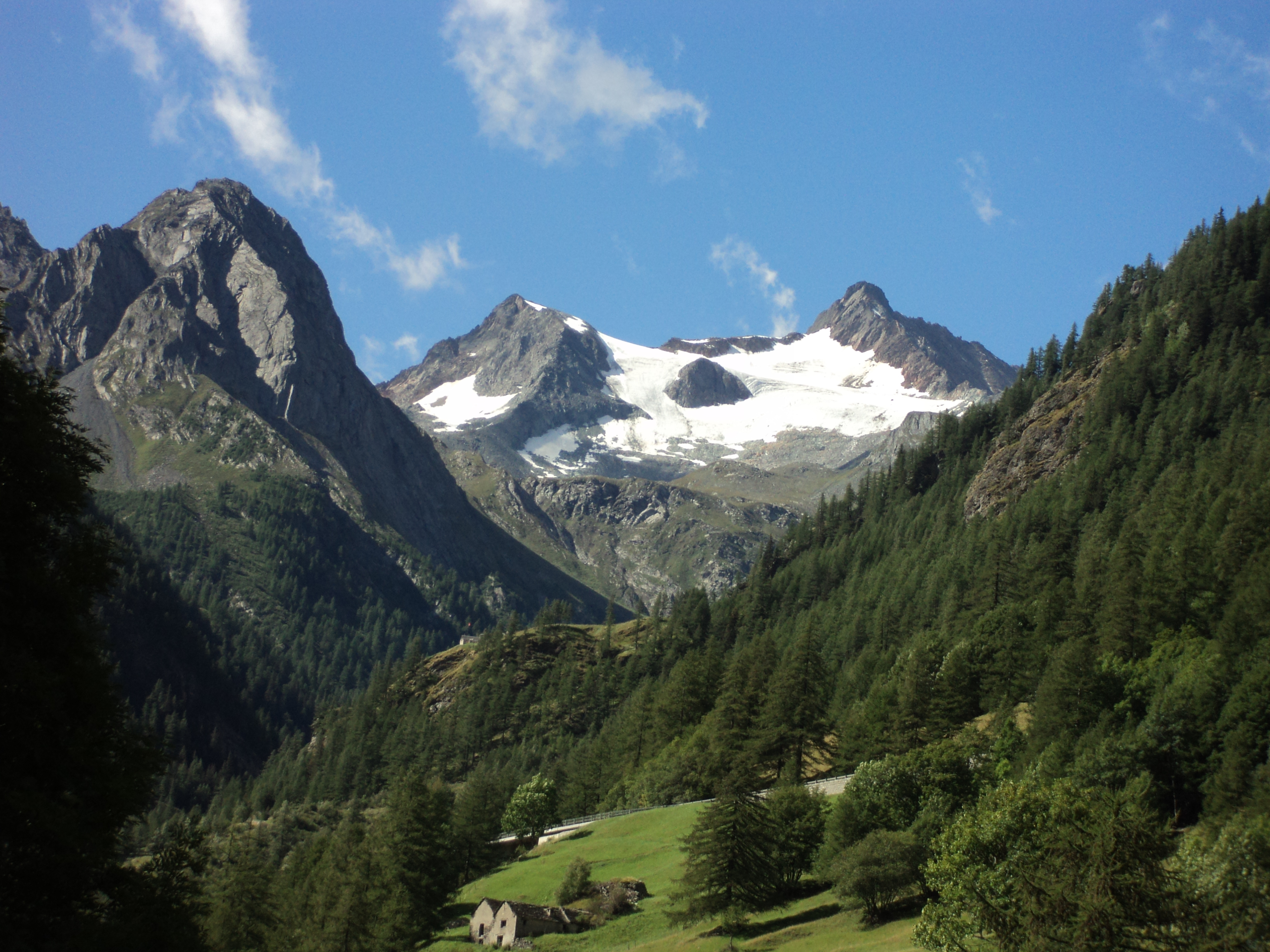
- The Tällihorn (right peak) from the Laggintal (north side)

Highest point
- Elevation: 3,448 m (11,312 ft)
- Prominence: 53 m (174 ft)
- Parent peak: Weissmies
- Coordinates: 46°7′24.9″N 8°2′15.9″E

Geography
- Location within Switzerland
- Location: Valais, Switzerland
- Parent range: Pennine Alps

The Tällihorn is a mountain of the Swiss Pennine Alps, located east of the Weissmies in the canton of Valais. It lies in the Val Divedro, south of the main Alpine watershed.
