= Pletschuhorn =

Mountain in Switzerland

- Location within Switzerland

Highest point
- Elevation: 2,751 m (9,026 ft)
- Prominence: 114 m (374 ft)
- Coordinates: 46°14′20.5″N 7°41′26.8″E

Geography
- Location: Valais, Switzerland
- Parent range: Pennine Alps

The Pletschuhorn is a mountain of the Swiss Pennine Alps, overlooking the Turtmanntal in the canton of Valais. It is composed of several summits, of which the highest has an elevation of 2,751 metres.

The closest locality is Gruben, on the east side of the mountain.
