= Balfrin =

Mountain in Switzerland

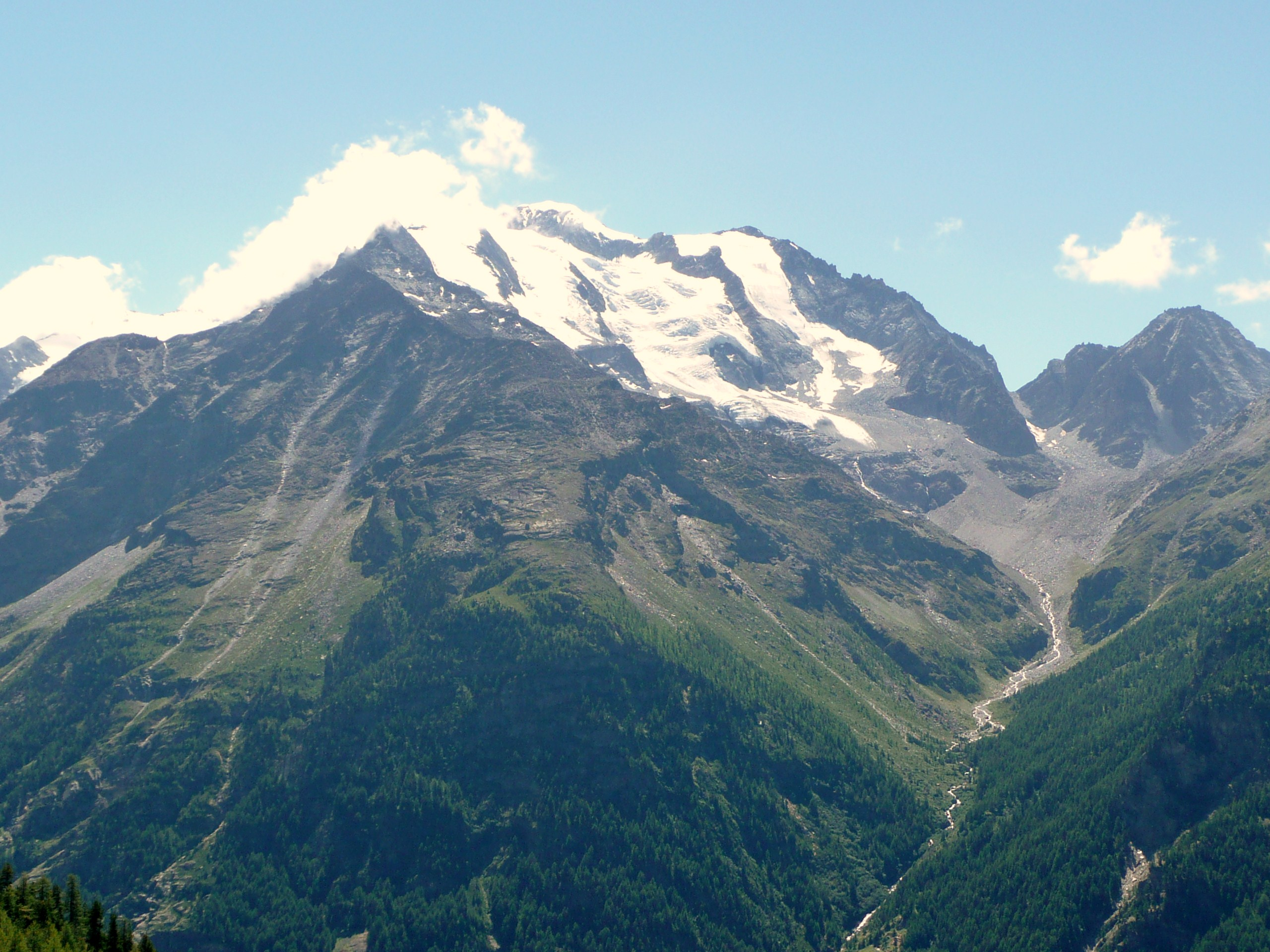
- The north side

Highest point
- Elevation: 3,796 m (12,454 ft)
- Prominence: 243 m (797 ft)
- Parent peak: Dom
- Coordinates: 46°08′06.3″N 7°52′49″E

Geography
- Location within Switzerland
- Location: Valais, Switzerland
- Parent range: Pennine Alps

The Balfrin is a mountain of the Swiss Pennine Alps, located north of the Dom in the canton of Valais. It belongs to the Mischabel massif, which lies between the Mattertal and the Saastal.

The northern side of the Balfrin is covered by a glacier named Balfringletscher. On the south side is the larger Ried Glacier.

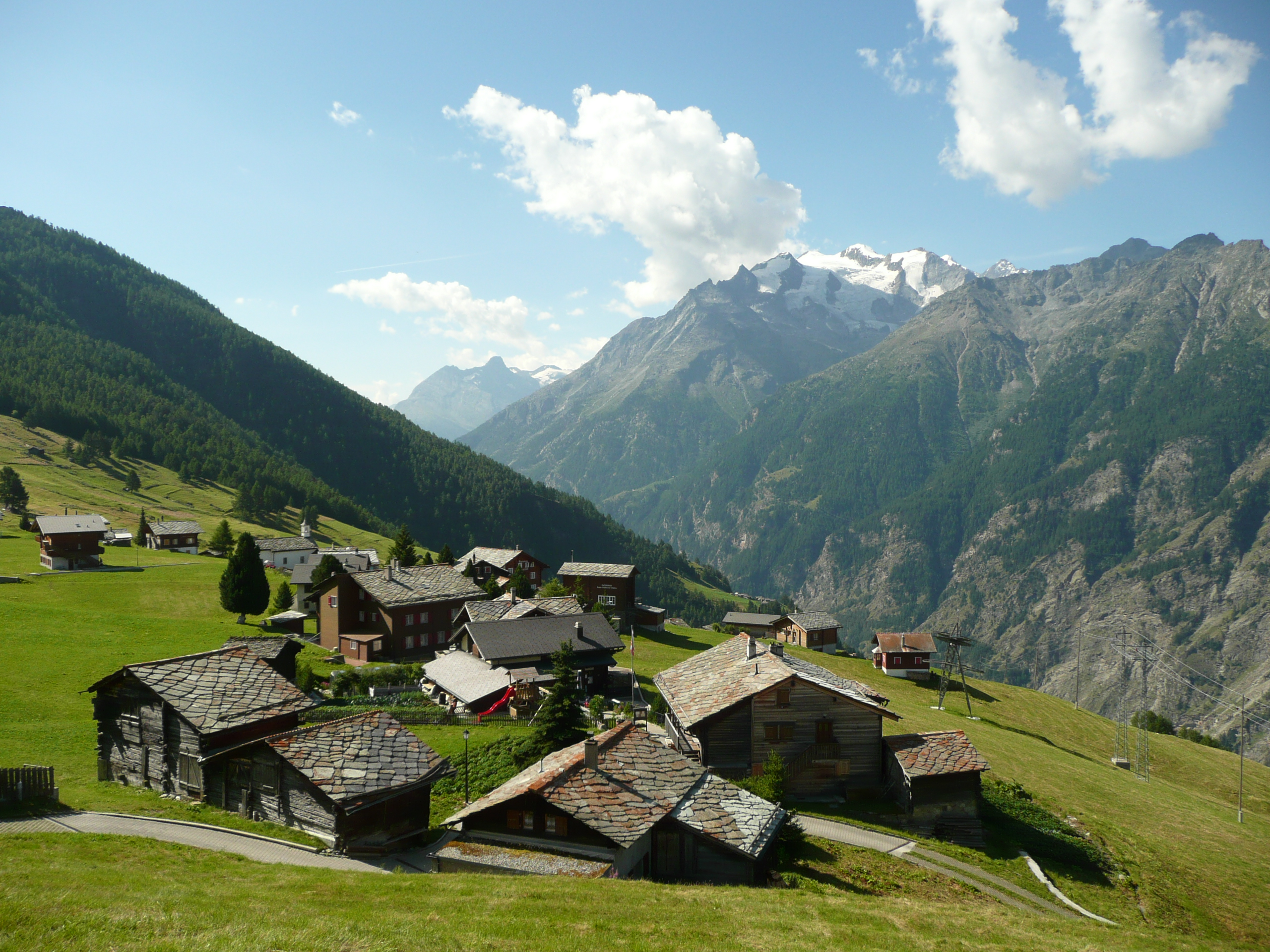
