= Aiguille des Angroniettes =

Mountain in Switzerland

- Location within Alps Location within Piedmont Location within Switzerland

Highest point
- Elevation: 2,885 m (9,465 ft)
- Prominence: 38 m (125 ft)
- Coordinates: 45°52′17″N 7°5′38″E

Geography
- Location: Valais, Switzerland; Aosta Valley, Italy
- Parent range: Pennine Alps

The Aiguille des Angroniettes is a mountain of the Pennine Alps, located on the border between Switzerland and Italy. It lies on the main Alpine watershed, west of the Grand Golliat.
