= Le Métailler =

Mountain in Switzerland

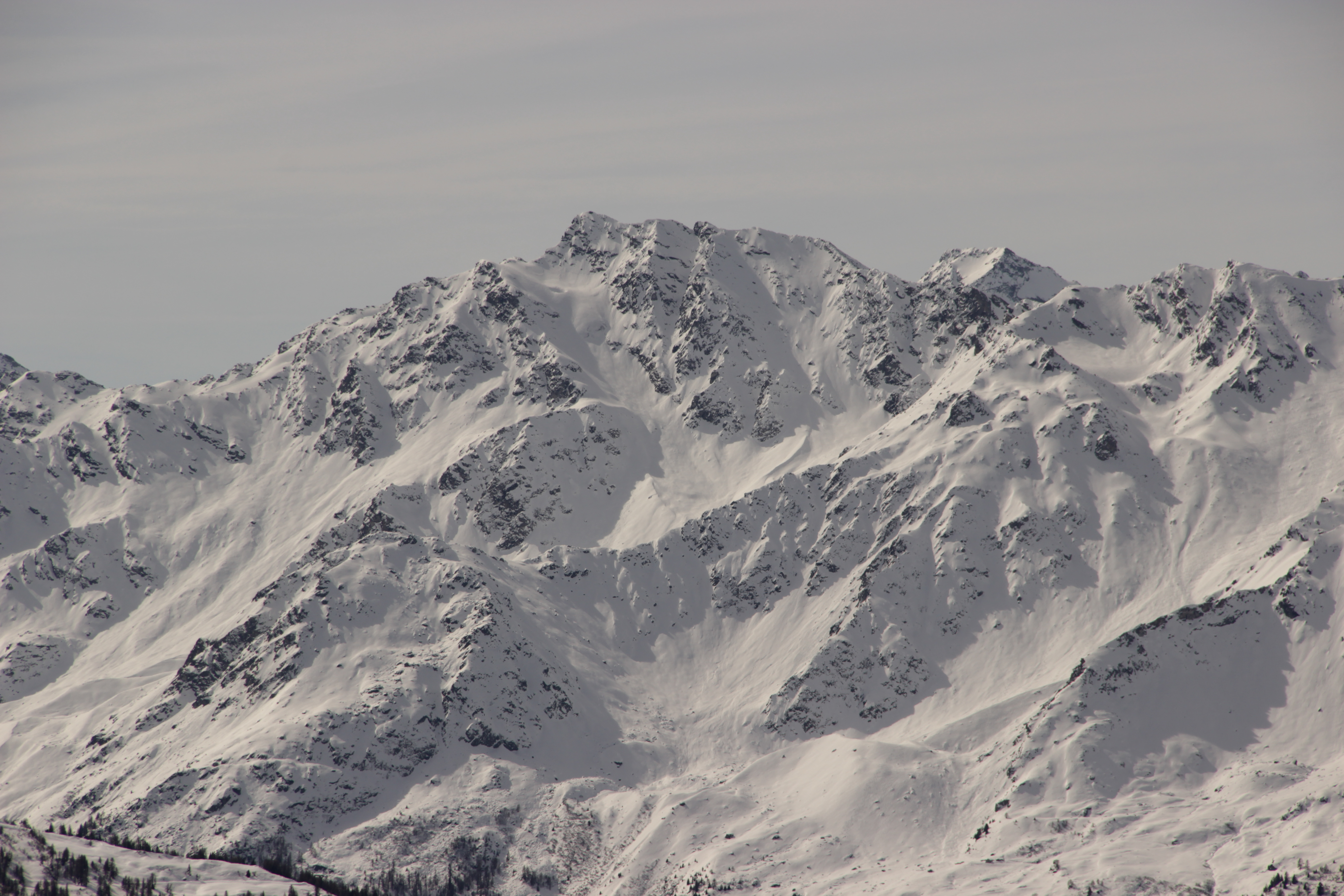
- Le Métailler

Highest point
- Elevation: 3,213 m (10,541 ft)
- Prominence: 301 m (988 ft)
- Listing: Alpine mountains above 3000 m
- Coordinates: 46°6′14.5″N 7°21′37.2″E

Geography
- Location within Switzerland
- Location: Valais, Switzerland
- Parent range: Pennine Alps

Le Métailler is a mountain of the Pennine Alps, overlooking the lake of Cleuson in the canton of Valais.
