= Mont Blava =

Mountain in Switzerland

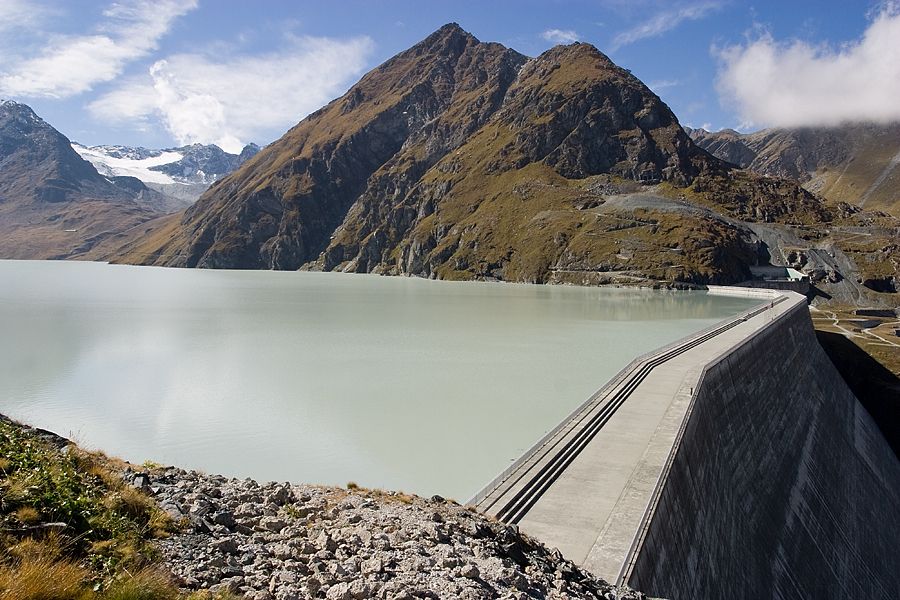
- Mont Blava from the Grande Dixence

Highest point
- Elevation: 2,932 m (9,619 ft)
- Prominence: 128 m (420 ft)
- Coordinates: 46°4′28.7″N 7°23′16.1″E

Geography
- Location within Switzerland
- Location: Valais, Switzerland
- Parent range: Pennine Alps

Mont Blava is a mountain of the Pennine Alps, overlooking the Lac des Dix in the canton of Valais. It rises above the artificial lake formed by the Grande Dixence Dam, the world's tallest gravity dam at a height of 285 metres. It is part of a major hydroelectric complex in the Val d'Hérémence.
