= Corno di Faller =

Mountain in Italy

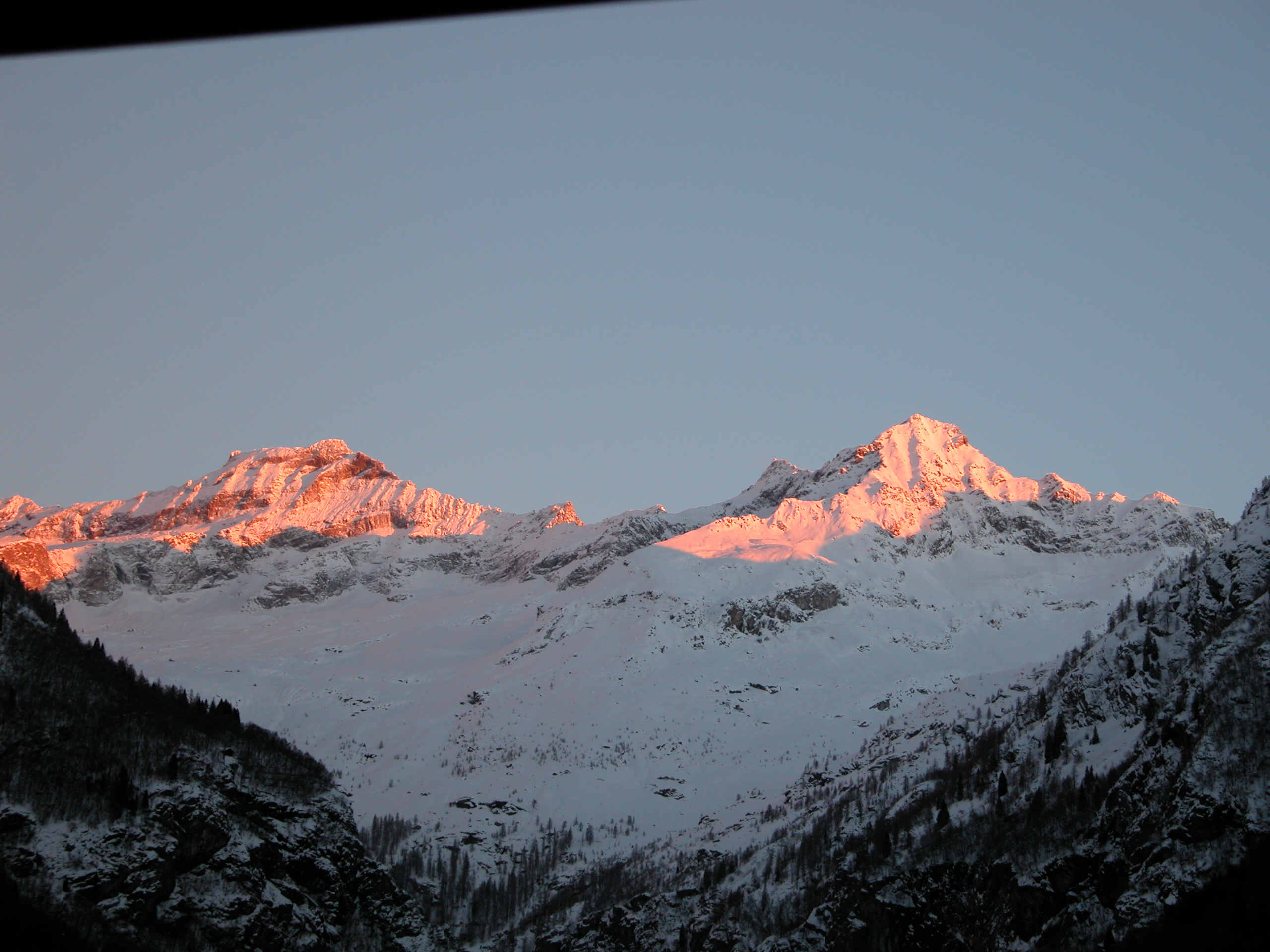
- Corno di Faller (right) seen from Alagna Valsesia

Highest point
- Elevation: 3,128 m (10,262 ft)
- Coordinates: 45°54′24″N 7°56′34″E

Geography
- Location: Piedmont, Italy
- Parent range: Pennine Alps

Corno di Faller, also known as Monte Turlo, or Fallerhorn in Walser language, is a mountain of Piedmont, Italy, with an elevation of 3,128 metres (10,262 ft).

Part of the Pennine Alps, it is located between the Valsesia, in the Province of Vercelli, and the Valle Anzasca, in the Province of Verbano-Cusio-Ossola. It lies west of Colle Turlo and south of the Bocchetta di Faller.
