= Seetalhorn =

Mountain in Switzerland

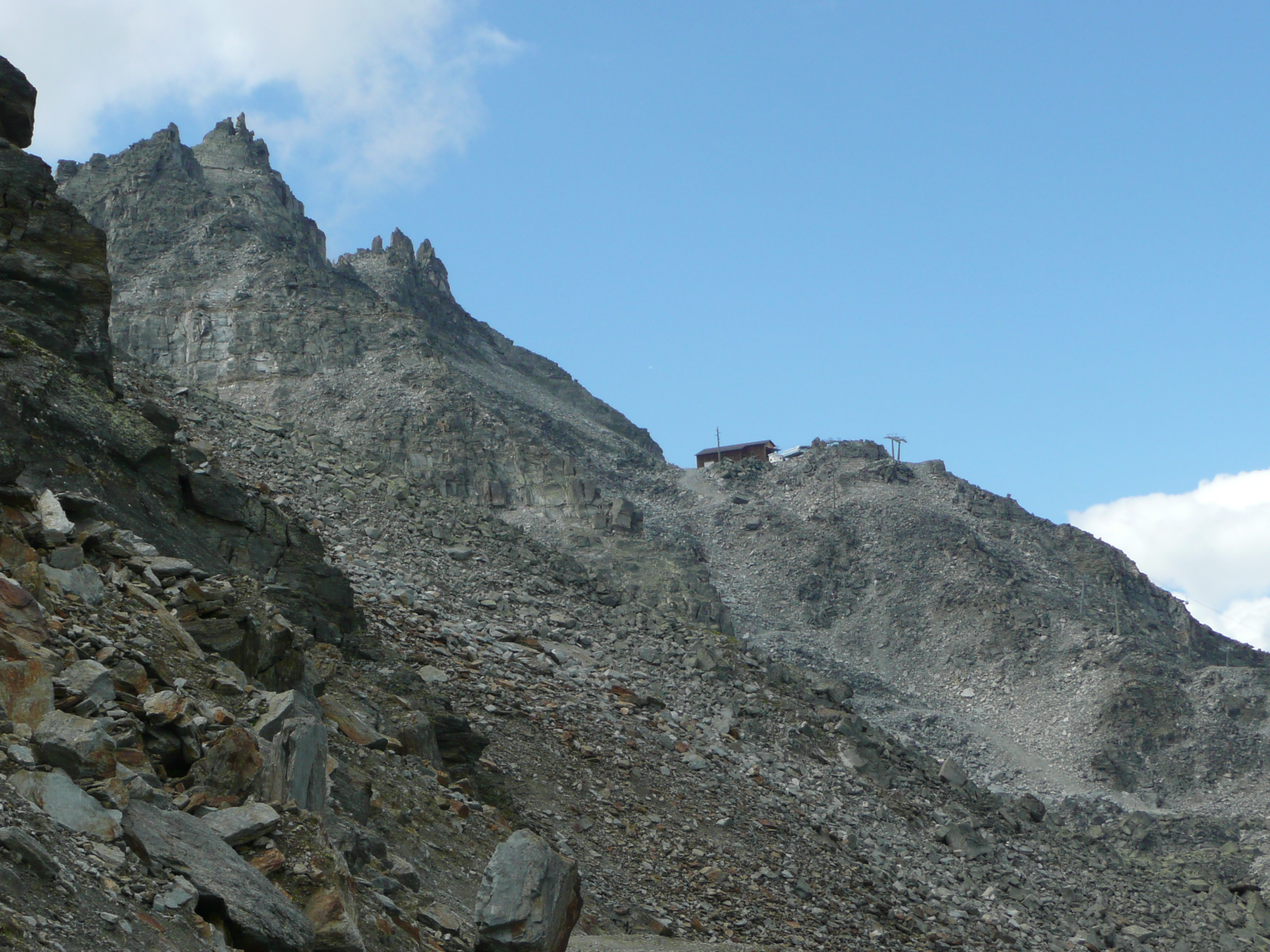

Highest point
- Elevation: 3,037 m (9,964 ft)
- Prominence: 62 m (203 ft)
- Parent peak: Platthorn
- Coordinates: 46°10′35″N 7°51′46″E

Geography
- Location within Switzerland
- Location: Valais, Switzerland
- Parent range: Pennine Alps

The Seetalhorn is a mountain of the Swiss Pennine Alps, overlooking Grächen in the canton of Valais. With an elevation of 3,037 m, it is the highest point of the ski area of Grächen.
