= Bösentrift =

Mountain in Switzerland

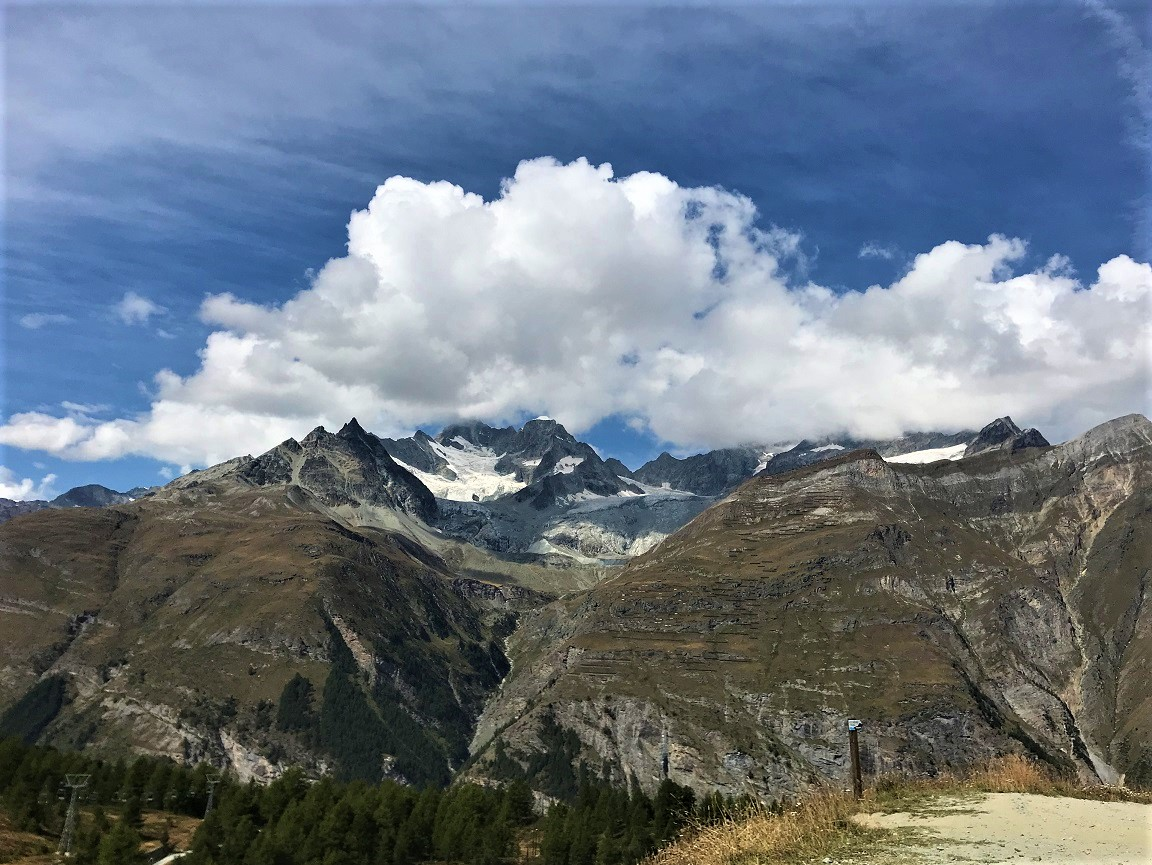
- Bösentrift and Oberrothorn on summer 2020

Highest point
- Elevation: 3,248 m (10,656 ft)
- Prominence: 127 m (417 ft)
- Coordinates: 46°2′33″N 7°48′9.9″E

Geography
- Location within Switzerland
- Location: Valais, Switzerland
- Parent range: Pennine Alps

The Bösentrift is a mountain of the Pennine Alps, overlooking Täsch and Zermatt in the canton of Valais. It lies north of the Oberrothorn.
