= Becca de Corbassière =

Mountain in Switzerland

- Location within Switzerland

Highest point
- Elevation: 2,749 m (9,019 ft)
- Prominence: 83 m (272 ft)
- Coordinates: 46°0′51″N 7°18′32″E

Geography
- Location: Valais, Switzerland
- Parent range: Pennine Alps

The Becca de Corbassière is a mountain of the Pennine Alps, overlooking Fionnay in the canton of Valais. It lies at the northern end of the chain separating the valley of the Corbassière Glacier from the main valley of Bagnes, north of the Grand Combin.
