= Guggilihorn =

Mountain in Switzerland

- Location within Switzerland

Highest point
- Elevation: 2,351 m (7,713 ft)
- Prominence: 86 m (282 ft)
- Coordinates: 46°9′54.2″N 8°5′17.5″E

Geography
- Location: Valais, Switzerland
- Parent range: Pennine Alps

The Guggilihorn is a mountain of the Swiss Pennine Alps, located south of Simplon in the canton of Valais. It lies on the range east of the Weissmies, between the Laggintal and the Zwischbergental.
