= Balmahorn =

Mountain in Switzerland

- Location within Switzerland

Highest point
- Elevation: 2,870 m (9,420 ft)
- Prominence: 97 m (318 ft)
- Parent peak: Weissmies
- Coordinates: 46°08′16″N 8°04′33″E

Geography
- Location: Valais, Switzerland
- Parent range: Pennine Alps

The Balmahorn is a mountain of the Pennine Alps, located south of Zwischbergen (Val Divedro) in the canton of Valais. The Balmahorn belongs to the Weissmies massif.
