= Wenghorn =

Mountain in Switzerland

- Location within Switzerland

Highest point
- Elevation: 2,587 m (8,488 ft)
- Prominence: 87 m (285 ft)
- Coordinates: 46°10′42.2″N 8°3′0.3″E

Geography
- Location: Valais, Switzerland
- Parent range: Pennine Alps

The Wenghorn is a mountain of the Swiss Pennine Alps, overlooking Simplon in the canton of Valais. It lies at the eastern end of the range east of the Fletschhorn.
