= Dürrenhorn =

Mountain in Switzerland

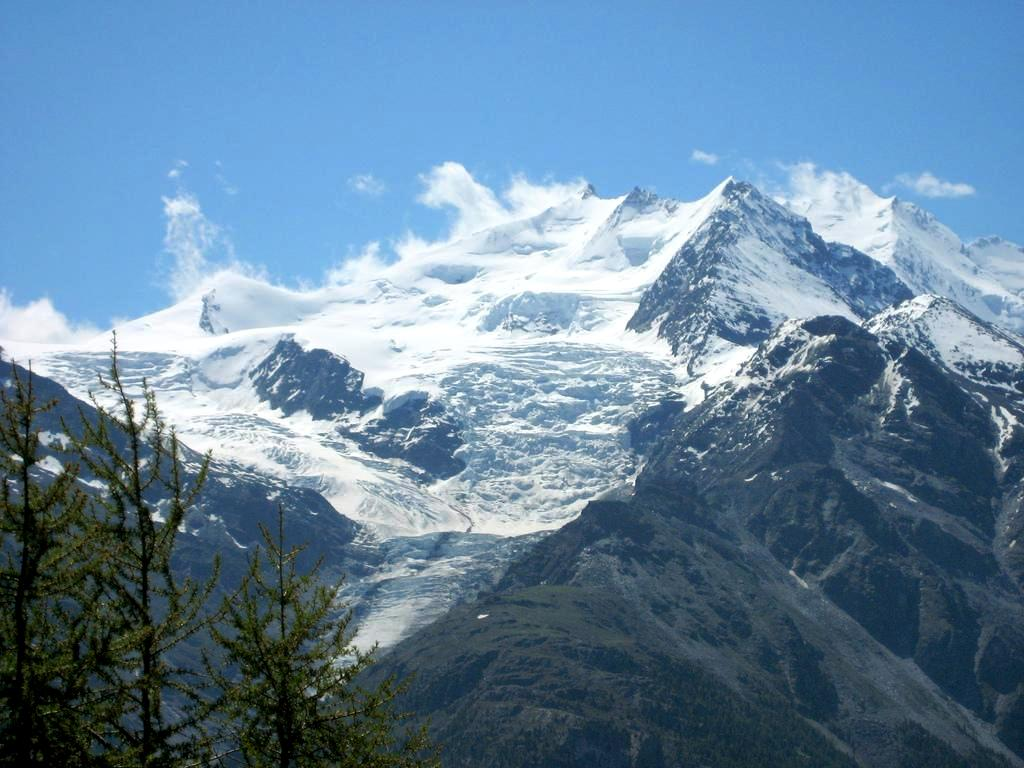
- The Dürrenhorn on the right, above the Ried Glacier

Highest point
- Elevation: 4,035 m (13,238 ft)
- Prominence: 124 m (407 ft)
- Parent peak: Dom
- Coordinates: 46°07′11″N 7°50′53″E

Geography
- Location within Switzerland
- Location: Switzerland
- Parent range: Pennine Alps

Climbing
- First ascent: 7 September 1879 by Albert Frederick Mummery and William Penhall with guides Alexander Burgener and Ferdinand Imseng

The Dürrenhorn (4,035 m) (also Dirruhorn) is a summit in the Pennine Alps in Switzerland. It lies towards the northern end of the Nadelgrat, a high-level ridge running roughly north–south above the resort of Saas-Fee to the east, and the Mattertal to the west. It is part of the Mischabel range, which culminates at the Dom (4,546 m).

North of the Dürrenhorn, there is located the sub-peak Klein Dürrenhorn (3889 m).

== See also ==
- List of 4000 metre peaks of the Alps
