= Mont Rogneux =

Mountain in Switzerland

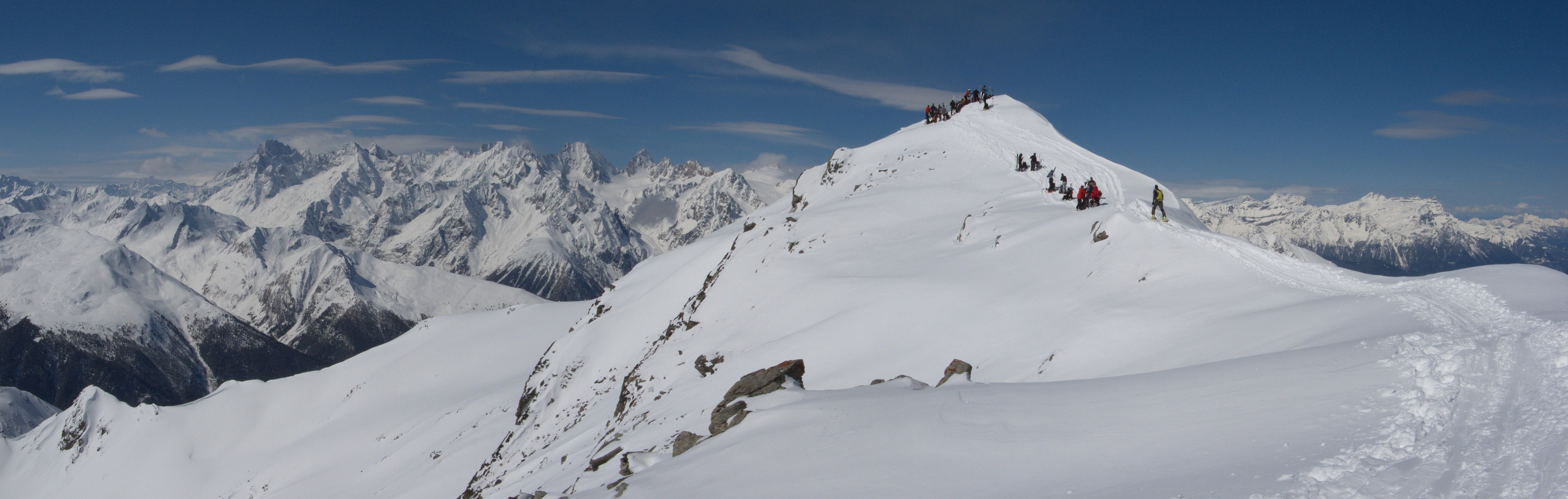

Highest point
- Elevation: 3,084 m (10,118 ft)
- Prominence: 90 m (300 ft)
- Parent peak: Grand Combin
- Coordinates: 46°0′34.2″N 7°13′50.9″E

Geography
- Location within Switzerland
- Location: Valais, Switzerland
- Parent range: Pennine Alps

Mont Rogneux is a mountain of the Swiss Pennine Alps, overlooking Liddes in the canton of Valais. It is a mountain located north of the Petit Combin and Grand Combin. Facing the Verbier ski resort and neighbouring the Bruson lifts.
