= Six Blanc =

Mountain in Switzerland

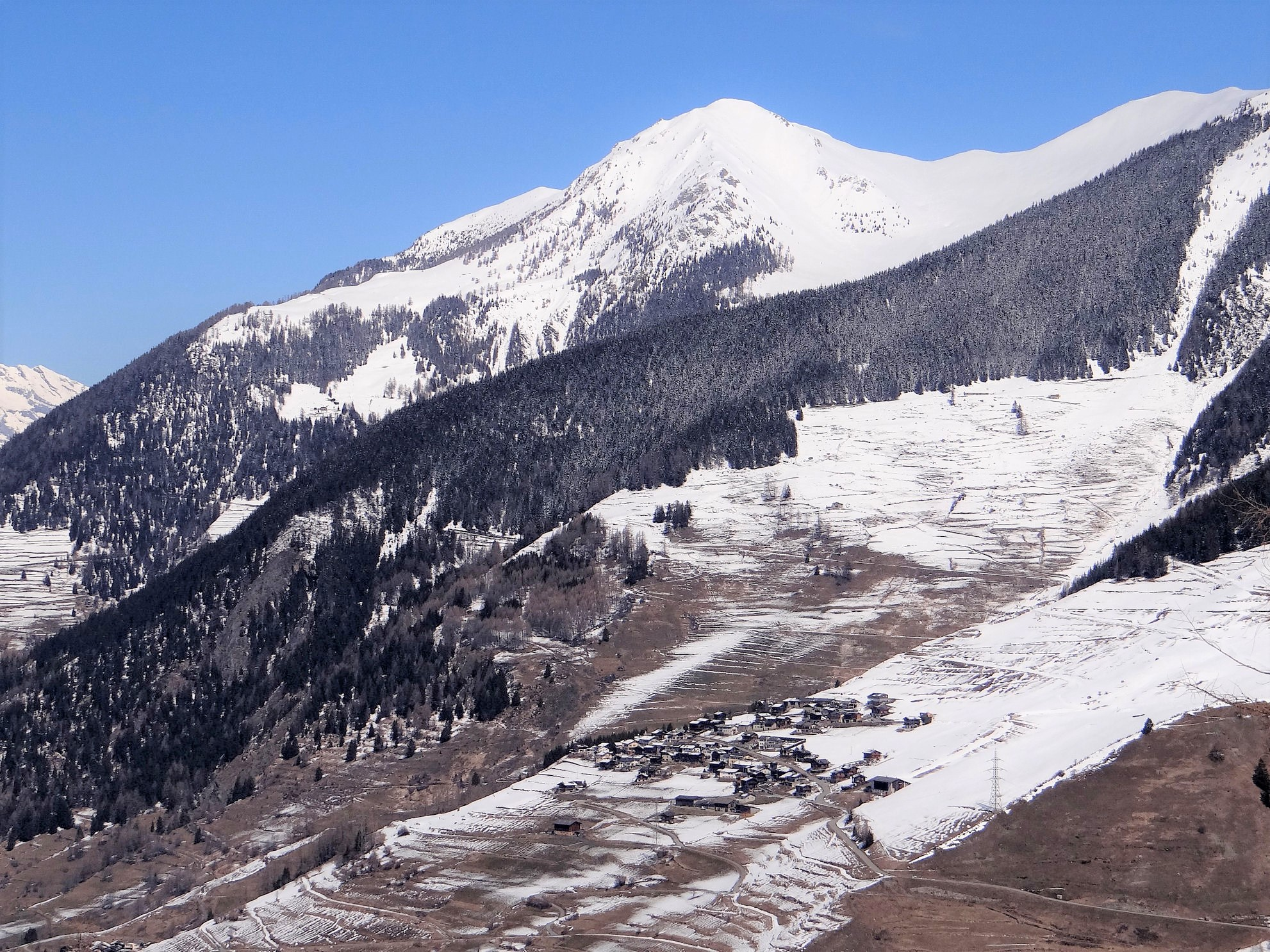
- Six Blanc above Chandonne, Val d'Entremont.

Highest point
- Elevation: 2,445 m (8,022 ft)
- Prominence: 114 m (374 ft)
- Coordinates: 46°2′14.2″N 7°11′6.4″E

Geography
- Location within Switzerland
- Location: Valais, Switzerland
- Parent range: Pennine Alps

The Six Blanc is a mountain of the Swiss Pennine Alps, overlooking Orsières in the canton of Valais. It lies at the northern end of the chain separating the valley of Entremont from the valley of Bagnes, culminating at the Grand Combin.
