= William Penhall =

William Penhall (27 October 1858 – 3 August 1882) was an English mountaineer.

== Life and family ==
The son of Dr John Penhall MRCS LSA (born 1833 at St Pancras, Middlesex, in 1871 a general practitioner in Hastings, Sussex), Penhall was educated at Trinity College, Cambridge, where he graduated BA in 1881. At the time of the 1881 census, he was enumerated at Trinity, giving his place of birth as Hastings, Sussex, and his occupation as "No Occ."

== Alpinism ==
=== First ascents ===
Penhall made the first ascent of a number of peaks and routes in the Alps during the silver age of alpinism.

Together with Martin Conway, G. S. Scriven and guides Ferdinand Imseng and Peter and M. Truffer he made the first ascent (in two and a half hours) of the west face of the Zinalrothorn in August 1878. With Albert Frederick Mummery and guides Alexander Burgener and Ferdinand Imseng he made the first ascent of the Dürrenhorn on 7 September 1879.

Penhall was involved in a race with Mummery to be the first to climb the Zmutt ridge of the Matterhorn, a race which Mummery eventually won. According to Penhall, his interest in finding a new way up the mountain had been kindled by Edward Whymper's account of the successful first ascent in 1865 in Scrambles amongst the Alps. As Mummery and Burgener approached the mountain to attempt the ridge they met Penhall, and guides Ferdinand Imseng and Louis Zurbrücken, who had retreated from the mountain after a bad-weather bivouac on the ridge. After a brief rest in Zermatt, Penhall returned to the Matterhorn, making the first ascent of its west face on 3 September 1879, a harder climb than the Zmutt ridge; his party reached the summit one hour after Mummery's. Penhall wrote an account of the west face climb in the Alpine Journal entitled 'The Matterhorn from the Zmutt Glacier'. The Penhall Couloir on the west face is named after him.

=== Death ===
Penhall and Meiringen guide Andreas Maurer were killed by an avalanche high up on the Wetterhorn on 3 August 1882. Penhall and Maurer share a double gravestone in the Grindelwald cemetery.
