= Sparruhorn =

Mountain in Switzerland

- Location within Switzerland

Highest point
- Elevation: 2,988 m (9,803 ft)
- Prominence: 106 m (348 ft)
- Coordinates: 46°11′0.5″N 7°46′8.8″E

Geography
- Location: Valais, Switzerland
- Parent range: Pennine Alps

The Sparruhorn is a mountain of the Swiss Pennine Alps, overlooking St. Niklaus in the canton of Valais. It lies on the range between the Turtmanntal and the Mattertal, although it is located within the Mattertal and not on the watershed between the two valleys.

On the north side of the mountain lies the small valley of the Jungtal. To the south, beyond the Sparrulicke, is the Festihorn.
