= Ochsehorn =

Mountain in Switzerland

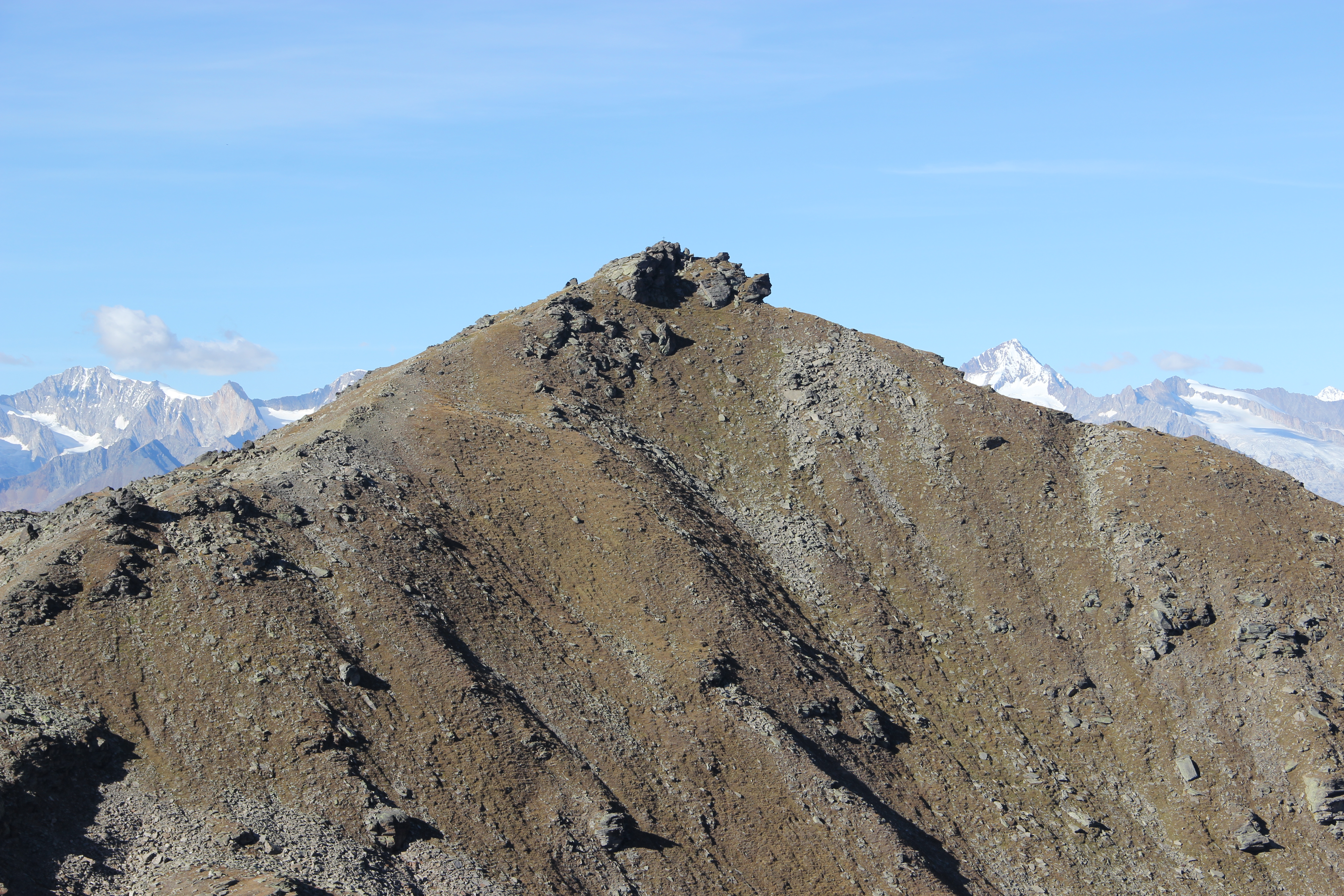

Highest point
- Elevation: 2,912 m (9,554 ft)
- Prominence: 131 m (430 ft)
- Coordinates: 46°13′13.8″N 7°56′27.4″E

Geography
- Location within Switzerland
- Location: Valais, Switzerland
- Parent range: Pennine Alps

The Ochsehorn is a mountain of the Swiss Pennine Alps, overlooking Staldenried in the canton of Valais. It lies between the Saastal and the upper Nanztal, north of the Mattwaldhorn.
