= La Cassorte =

Mountain in Switzerland

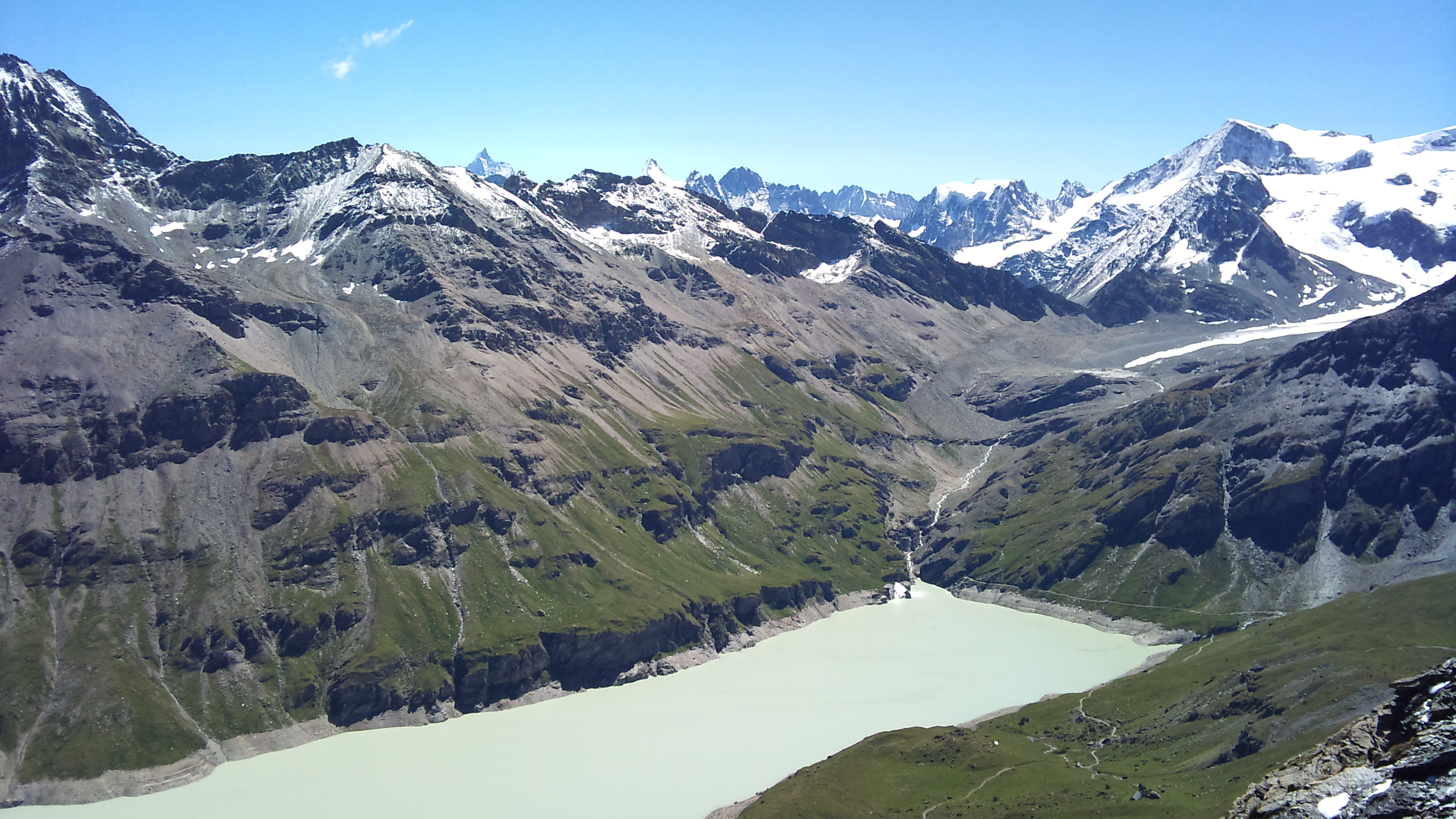

Highest point
- Elevation: 3,301 m (10,830 ft)
- Prominence: 31 m (102 ft)
- Parent peak: Monts Rouges (3,314 m)
- Coordinates: 46°2′7.3″N 7°26′7.5″E

Geography
- Location within Switzerland
- Location: Valais, Switzerland
- Parent range: Pennine Alps

La Cassorte is a mountain of the Swiss Pennine Alps, located west of Arolla in the canton of Valais. It lies on the range between the Lac des Dix and the Val d'Arolla, south of the Aiguilles Rouges d'Arolla.
