= Mont de la Gouille =

Mountain in Switzerland

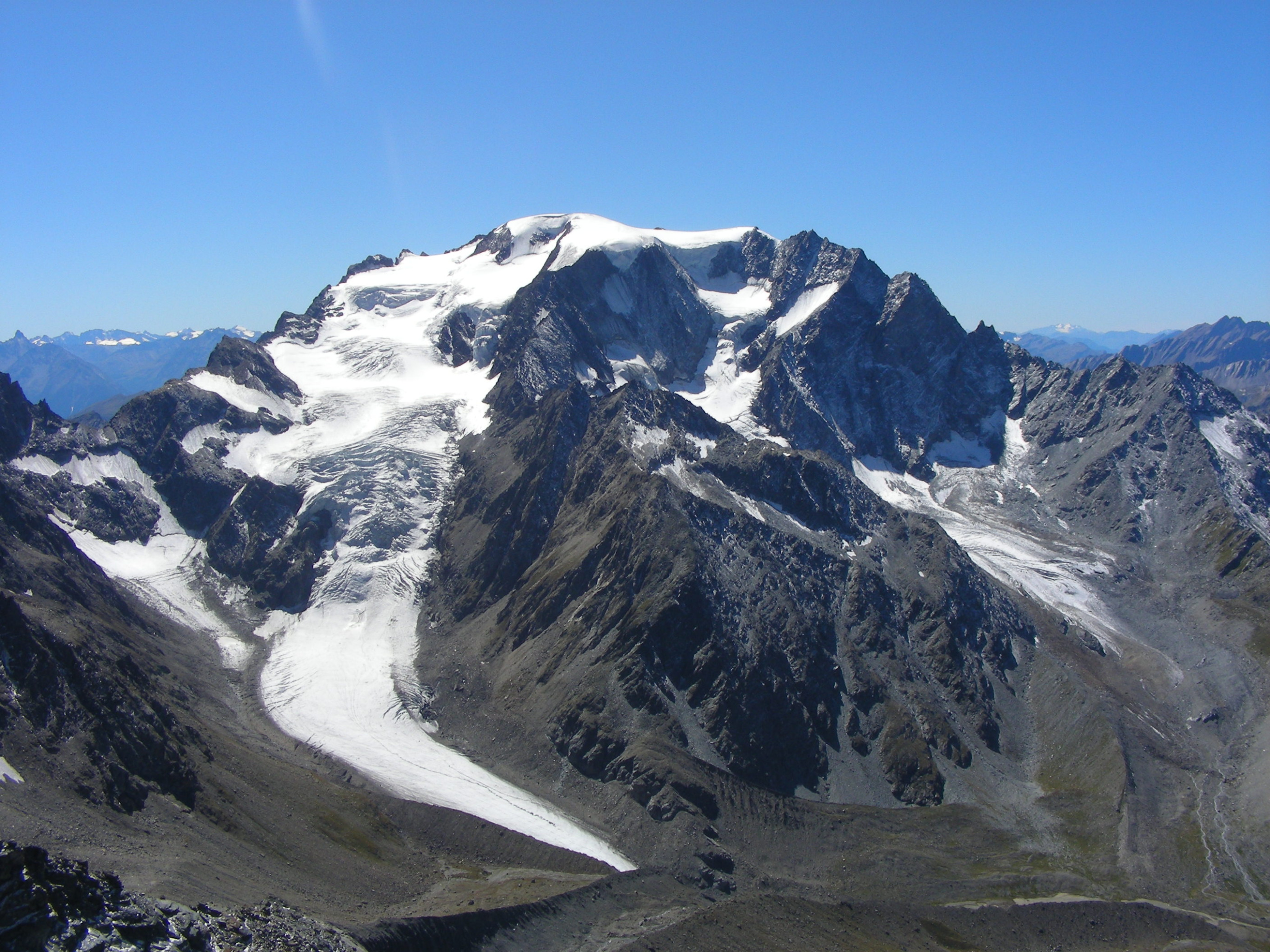
- Mont de la Gouille (centre) and Mont Vélan behind

Highest point
- Elevation: 3,212 m (10,538 ft)
- Prominence: 62 m (203 ft)
- Parent peak: Mont Vélan
- Listing: Mountains of Switzerland
- Coordinates: 45°54′25.1″N 7°15′34″E

Geography
- Location within Switzerland
- Location: Valais, Switzerland
- Parent range: Pennine Alps

Mont de la Gouille is a mountain of the Swiss Pennine Alps, located south of Bourg-Saint-Pierre in the canton of Valais. It belong to the Mont Vélan massif.
