= Cima Verosso =

Mountain in Italy and Switzerland

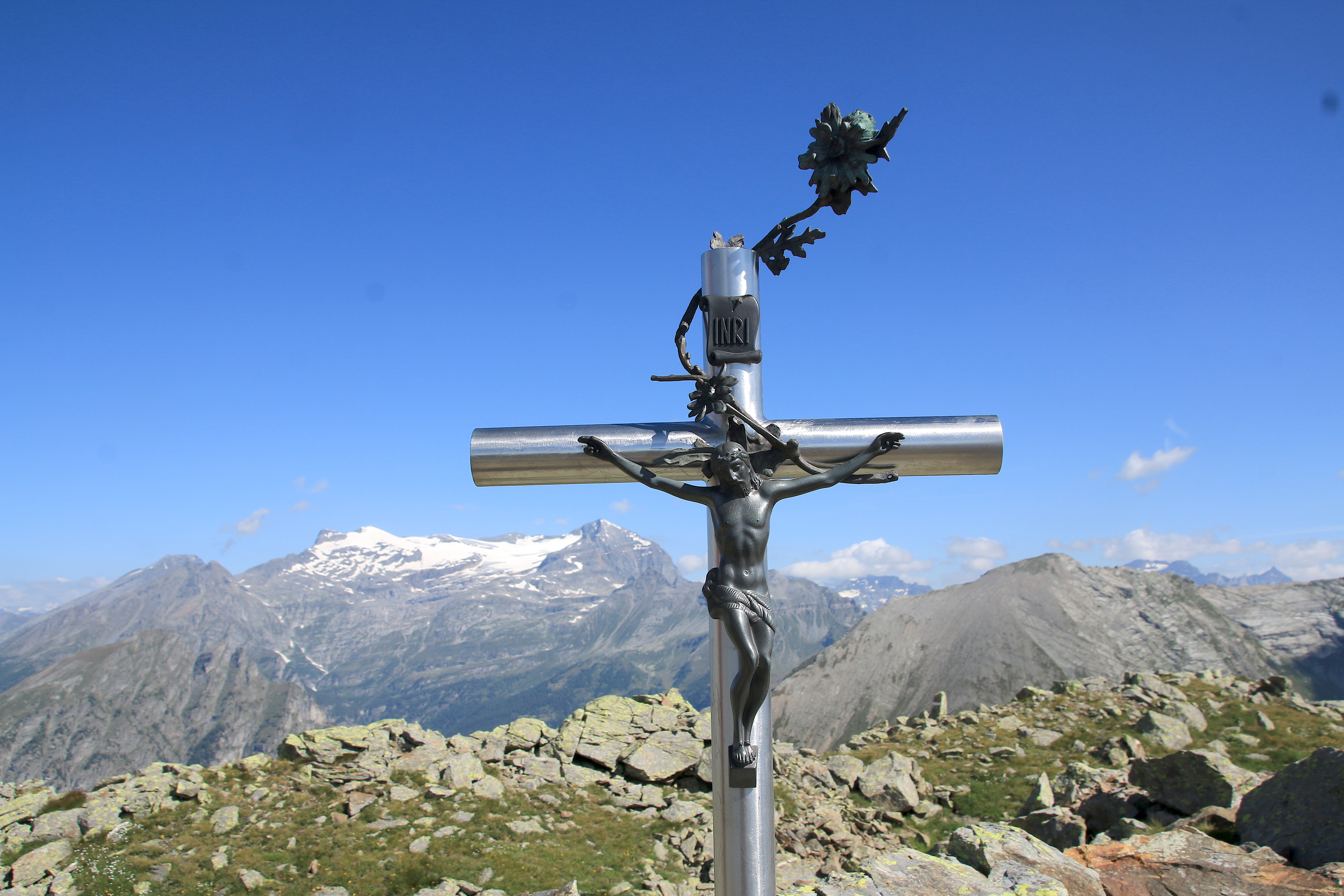
- Summit cross on Cima Verosso. Background: Breithorn and Monte Leone

Highest point
- Elevation: 2,444 m (8,018 ft)
- Prominence: 118 m (387 ft)
- Coordinates: 46°8′49″N 8°9′22″E

Geography
- Location within Alps
- Location: Piedmont, Italy (mountain partially in Switzerland)
- Parent range: Pennine Alps

The Cima Verosso (2,444 m) is a mountain of the Pennine Alps, located west of Bognanco in the Italian region of Piedmont. It lies on the range east of the Portjengrat between the Val Divedro and the Valle di Bognanco. Its summit lies just east of the watershed and border with the Swiss canton of Valais.

On its western (Swiss side), the mountain overlooks the lake Tschawinersee.
