= Pointe d'Ar Pitetta =

Mountain in Switzerland

- Location within Switzerland

Highest point
- Elevation: 3,133 m (10,279 ft)
- Prominence: 153 m (502 ft)
- Parent peak: Weisshorn
- Coordinates: 46°6′38.8″N 7°39′59.6″E

Geography
- Location: Valais, Switzerland
- Parent range: Pennine Alps

The Pointe d'Ar Pitetta (also spelled Pointe d'Arpitetta) is a mountain of the Swiss Pennine Alps, located south of Zinal in the canton of Valais. It lies west of the Weisshorn.
