= Signalhorn =

Mountain in Switzerland

- Location within Switzerland

Highest point
- Elevation: 2,911 m (9,551 ft)
- Prominence: 130 m (430 ft)
- Coordinates: 46°15′19.7″N 7°44′47.4″E

Geography
- Location: Valais, Switzerland
- Parent range: Pennine Alps

The Signalhorn (2,911 m) is a mountain of the Swiss Pennine Alps, located south of Eischoll in the canton of Valais. It lies between the valleys of Turtmann and Ginals.
