= Petite Aiguille =

Mountain in Switzerland

- Location within Switzerland

Highest point
- Elevation: 3,517 m (11,539 ft)
- Prominence: 57 m (187 ft)
- Parent peak: Le Moine
- Coordinates: 45°56′34″N 7°16′26″E

Geography
- Location: Valais, Switzerland
- Parent range: Pennine Alps

The Petite Aiguille is a mountain of the Pennine Alps, situated near Bourg Saint Pierre in Switzerland. It is located on the ridge Les Maisons Blanches in the Grand Combin massif.
