= Ergischhorn =

Mountain in Switzerland

Highest point
- Elevation: 2,526 m (8,287 ft)
- Coordinates: 46°16′26.4″N 7°44′8.6″E

Geography
- Location: Switzerland
- Parent range: Pennine Alps

The Ergischhorn is a mountain in the Pennine Alps in Switzerland.
