= Hirsihorn =

Mountain in Switzerland

- Pointe de la Forcletta
- Location within Switzerland

Highest point
- Elevation: 3,076 m (10,092 ft)
- Prominence: 162 m (531 ft)
- Parent peak: Pointe de Tourtemagne
- Coordinates: 46°11′13″N 7°39′32″E

Geography
- Location: Valais, Switzerland
- Parent range: Pennine Alps

The Hirsihorn (also known as Pointe de la Forcletta) is a mountain of the Swiss Pennine Alps, located east of Ayer in the canton of Valais. It lies between the valleys of Anniviers and Turtmann, north of the Forcletta pass.
