= Le Mourin =

Mountain in Switzerland

- Location within Switzerland

Highest point
- Elevation: 2,766 m (9,075 ft)
- Prominence: 141 m (463 ft)
- Coordinates: 45°56′24.2″N 7°10′46.4″E

Geography
- Location: Valais, Switzerland
- Parent range: Pennine Alps

Le Mourin is a mountain of the Swiss Pennine Alps, located west of Bourg-Saint-Pierre in the canton of Valais. On its south-east side the mountain overlooks the Lac des Toules.
