= Böshorn =

Mountain in Switzerland

- Rauthorn
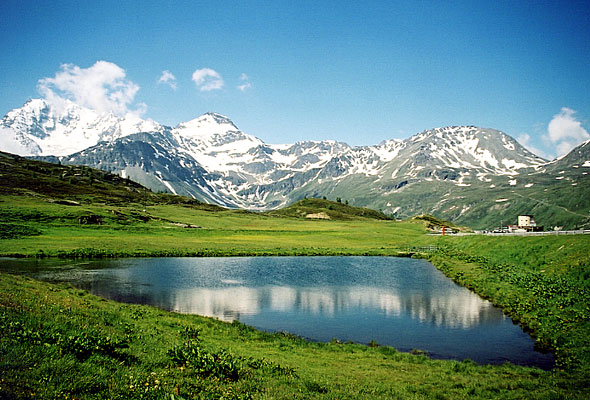
- The Fletschhorn (left) and the Böshorn (centre left) from the Simplon Pass

Highest point
- Elevation: 3,268 m (10,722 ft)
- Prominence: 120 m (390 ft)
- Parent peak: Weissmies
- Coordinates: 46°11′56.4″N 7°59′33.5″E

Geography
- Location within Switzerland
- Location: Valais, Switzerland
- Parent range: Pennine Alps

The Böshorn (also known as Rauthorn) is a mountain in the Swiss Pennine Alps, overlooking Simplon in the canton of Valais. The mountain lies between the upper Nanztal and the Val Divedro.

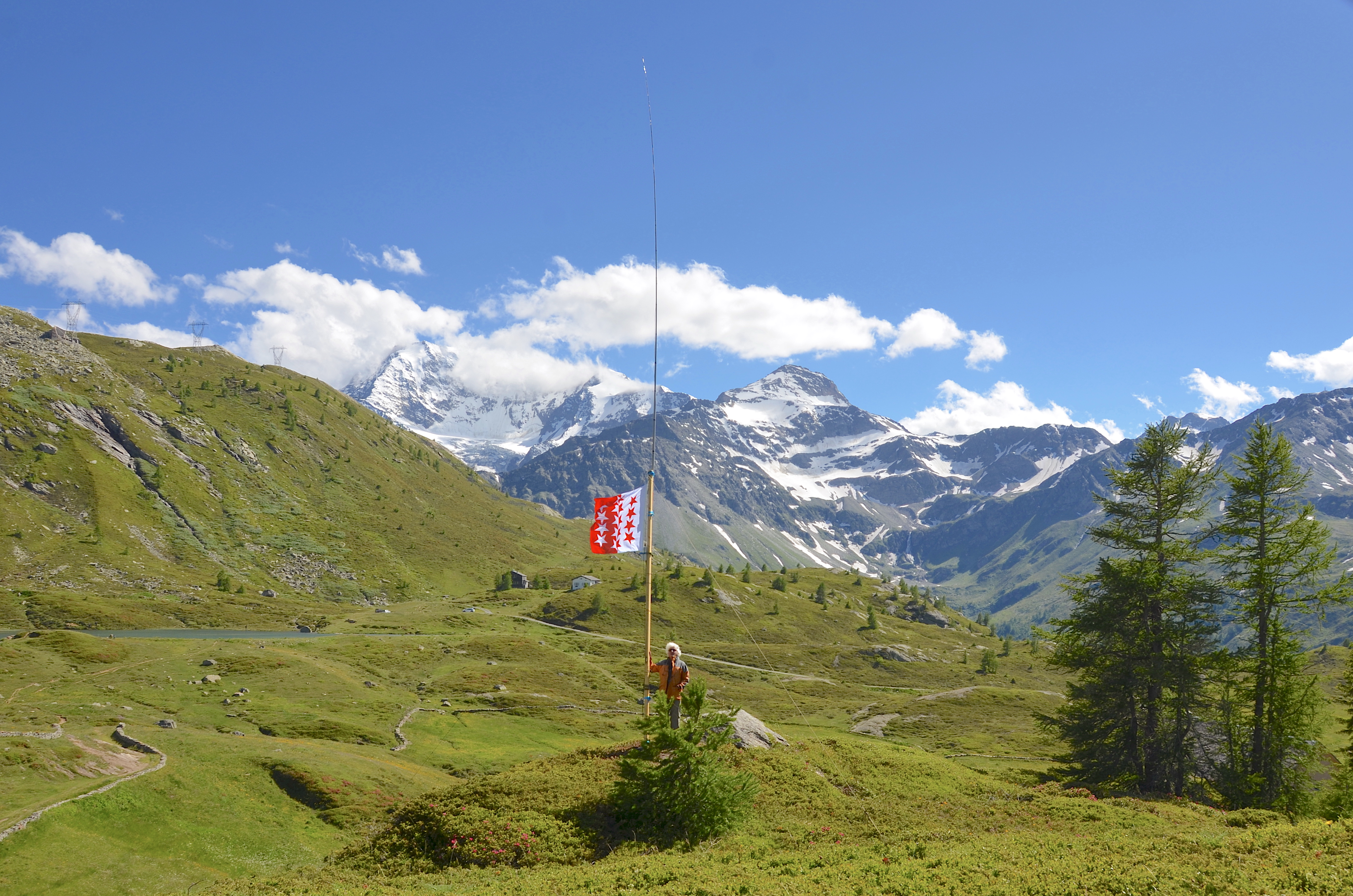
Böshorn on the right hand side of the flag
