= Wasuhorn =

Mountain in Switzerland

- Location within Switzerland

Highest point
- Elevation: 3,343 m (10,968 ft)
- Prominence: 118 m (387 ft)
- Coordinates: 46°10′24″N 07°44′57″E

Geography
- Location: Valais, Switzerland
- Parent range: Pennine Alps

The Wasuhorn (3,343 m) is a mountain of the Swiss Pennine Alps, located west of St. Niklaus in the canton of Valais. It is the highest summit in the Jungtal.

On its northern side lies a glacier named Junggletscher.
