= Ried Glacier =

Glacier in Switzerland

- Riedgletscher
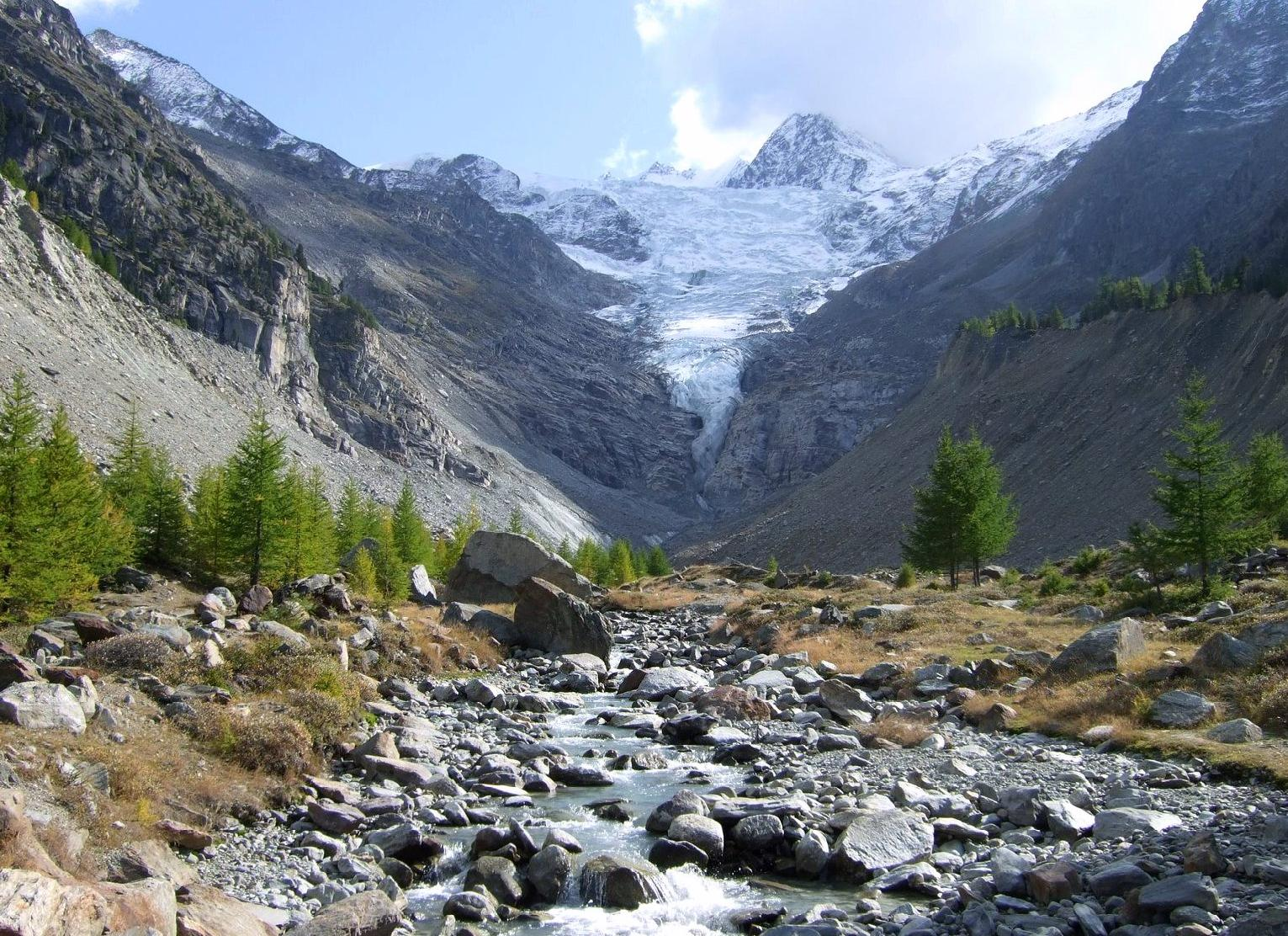
- Lower part, below the Dürrenhorn

- Location within Switzerland Location within Canton of Valais Location within Alps
- Location: Valais, Switzerland
- Coordinates: 46°7′51″N 7°51′28″E
- Length: 6 km (3.7 mi)

The Ried Glacier (German: Riedgletscher) is a 6 km long glacier (2005) situated in the Pennine Alps in the canton of Valais in Switzerland. In 1973 it had an area of 8.22 km^{2}.

The glacier lies in the Mischabel range, at the foot of Nadelhorn and not far from Dom.

== See also ==
- List of glaciers in Switzerland
- Swiss Alps
