= Moiry Glacier =

Glacier in Switzerland

- Glacier de Moiry
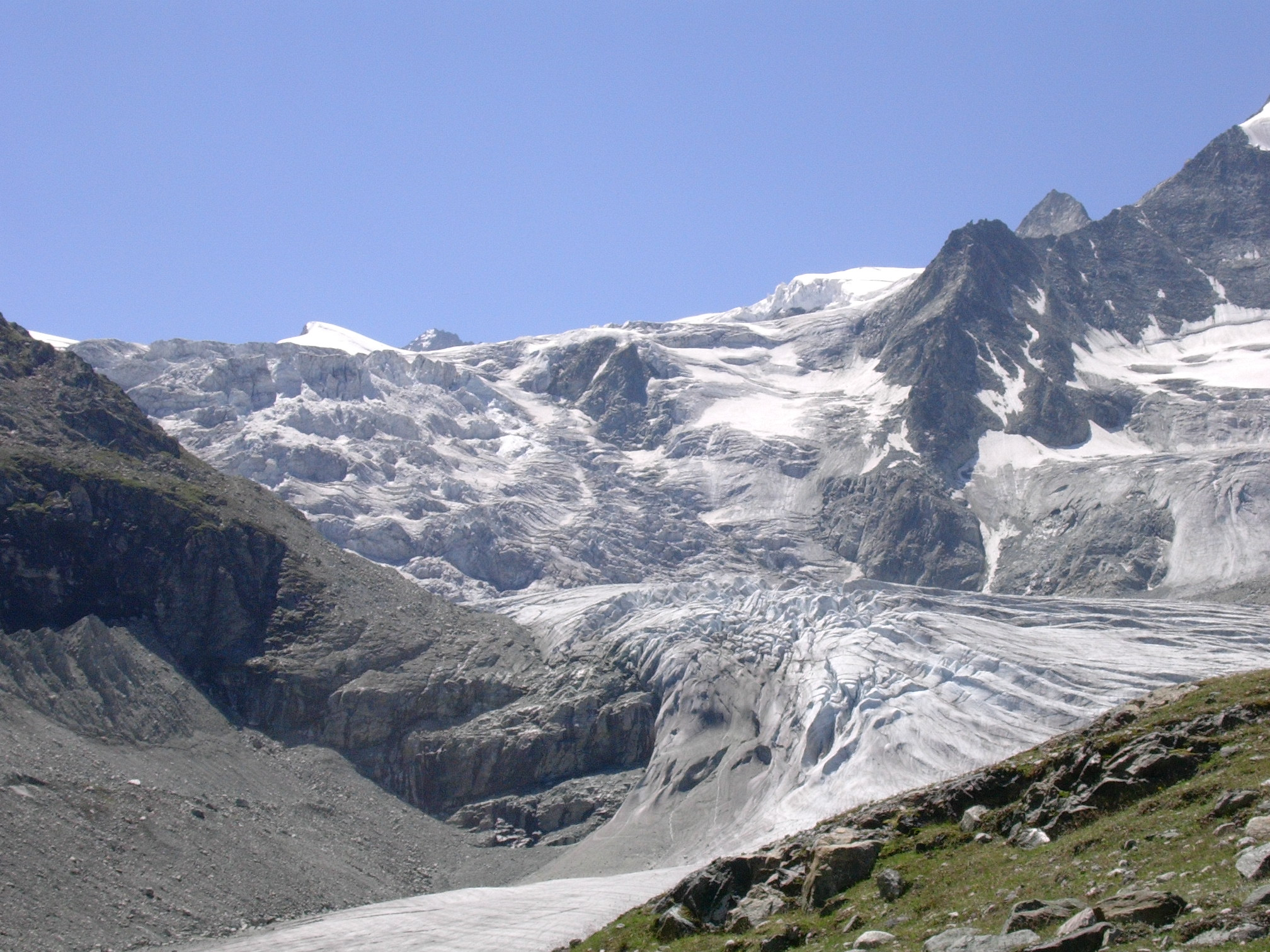
- Interactive map of Moiry Glacier
- Location: Valais, Switzerland
- Coordinates: 46°4′42″N 7°35′55″E
- Length: 5 km

The Moiry Glacier (French: Glacier de Moiry) is a 5 km long glacier (2005) situated in the Pennine Alps in the canton of Valais in Switzerland. In 1973 it had an area of 5.75 km^{2}.

== See also ==
- List of glaciers in Switzerland
- Swiss Alps
