= Corne de Sorebois =

Mountain in Switzerland

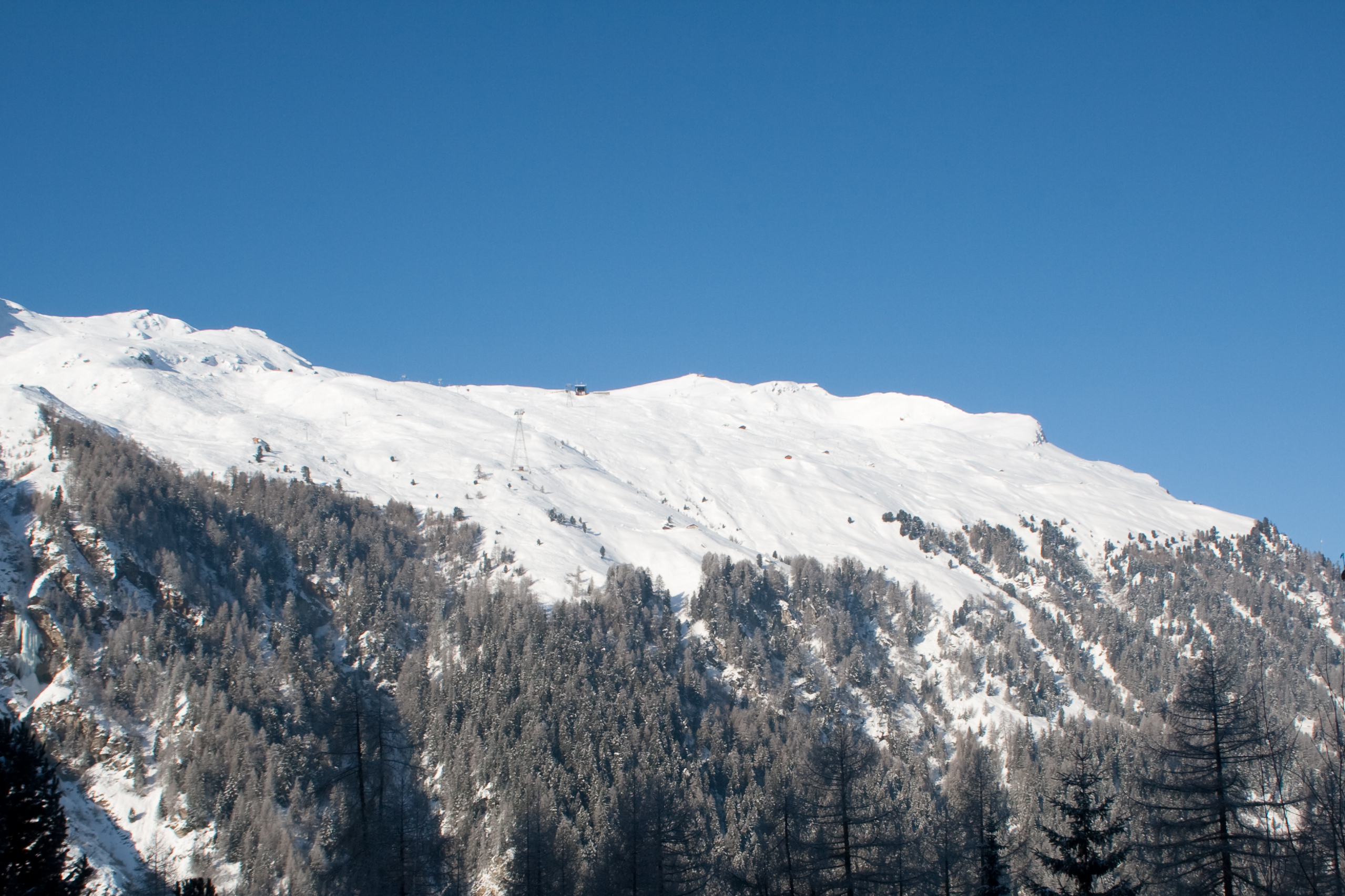

Highest point
- Elevation: 2,896 m (9,501 ft)
- Prominence: 82 m (269 ft)
- Coordinates: 46°09′02.6″N 7°35′12.1″E

Geography
- Location within Switzerland
- Location: Valais, Switzerland
- Parent range: Pennine Alps

The Corne de Sorebois is a mountain in the Pennine Alps in Switzerland. It is located near Zinal in Valais. Sorebois is the name of an alpine pasture on the east slopes of the mountain.

== See also ==
- List of mountains of Switzerland accessible by public transport
