= Pennine Alps =

Mountain range in the western Alps within Italy and Switzerland

- French: Alpes Pennines, German: Walliser Alpen, Italian: Alpi Pennine, Latin: Alpes Poeninae
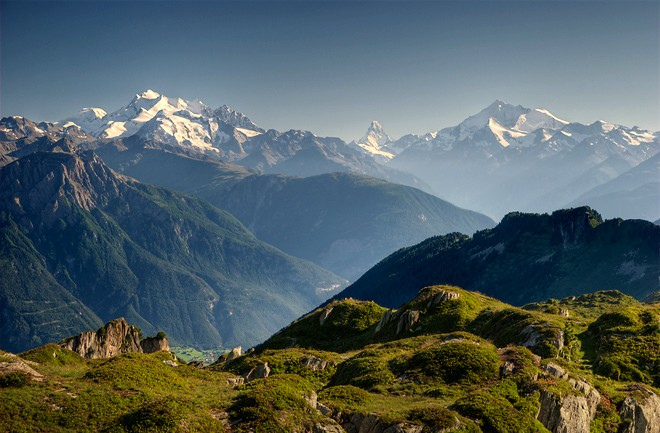
- View of Pennine Alps from Riederalp

Highest point
- Peak: Italian: Punta Dufour/German: Dufourspitze
- Elevation: 4,634 m (15,203 ft)
- Coordinates: 45°56′12″N 7°52′00″E

Geography
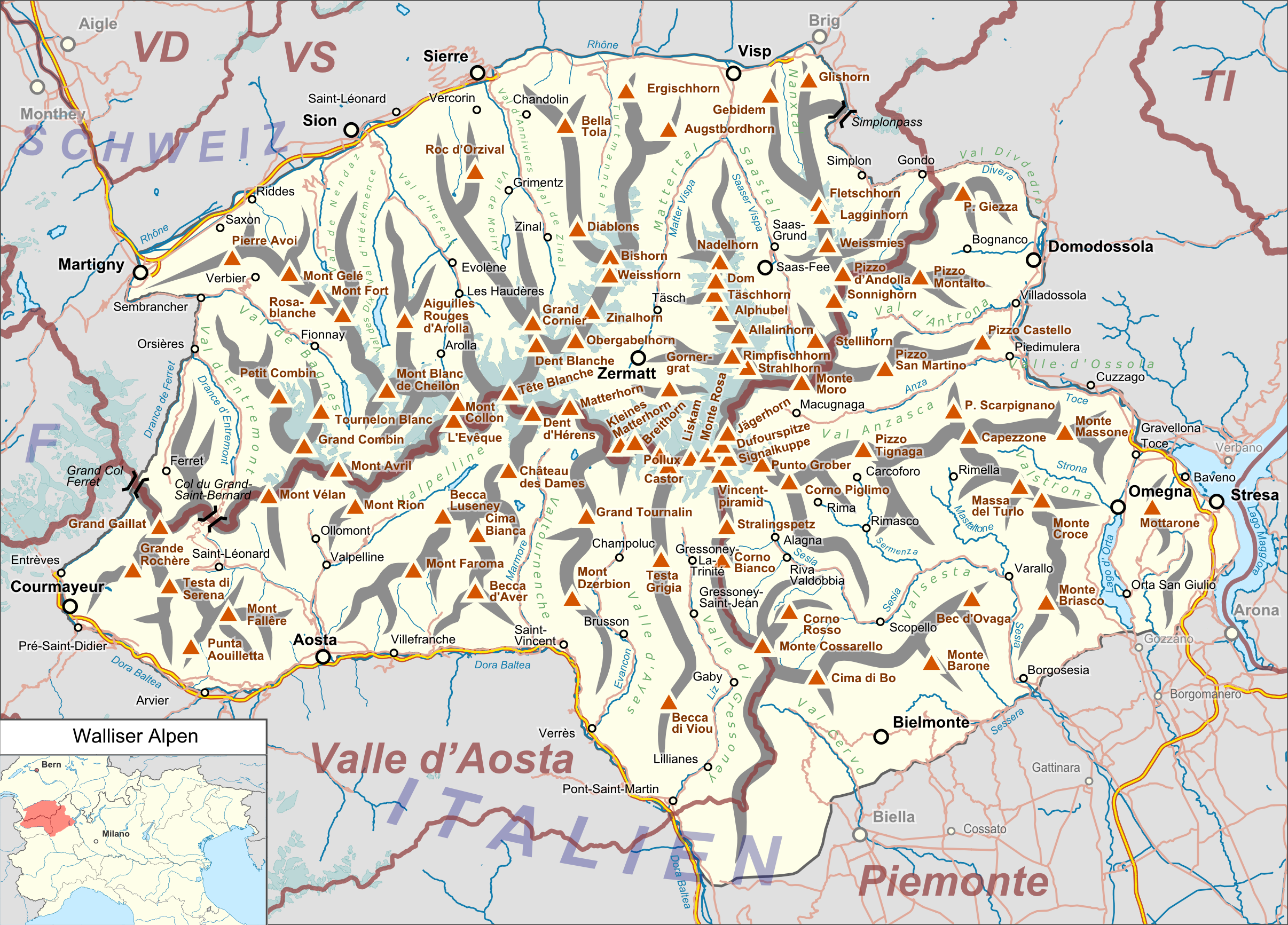
- Map of Pennine Alps and their location in Switzerland and Italy (red)
- Countries: Italy; Switzerland
- Regions/Canton: Aosta Valley; Piedmont; Valais
- Range coordinates: 46°05′N 7°50′E
- Parent range: Alps
- Borders on: Bernese Alps; Graian Alps; Lepontine Alps; Po Valley

The Pennine Alps (French: Alpes Pennines, German: Walliser Alpen, Italian: Alpi Pennine, Latin: Alpes Poeninae), are a mountain range in the western part of the Alps. Sometimes referred to as the Valais Alps (when applied to the northern Swiss part of the Pennines), they are located in the canton of Valais in southwestern Switzerland and in the Aosta Valley and Piedmont of Italy.

Together with the Bernese Alps and the Graian Alps (that include the Mont Blanc massif), the Pennines are amongst the three highest major subranges of the Alps.

== Geography ==
The Pennine Alps straddle the border between southwestern Switzerland and northwestern Italy. The Italian side is drained by the Dora Baltea, Sesia and Toce rivers, all tributaries of the Po. The Swiss side is drained by the Rhône.

The Great St Bernard Tunnel, under the Great St Bernard Pass, spans between Martigny, Switzerland, to Aosta, Italy.

== Morphology ==
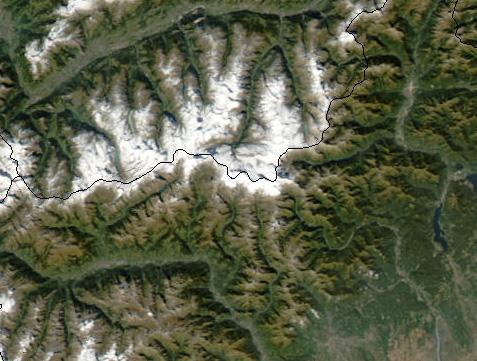
2002 Satellite image of the Pennine Alps in summer. Part of the Mont Blanc massif is visible on the west. Its boundaries are the Aosta Valley on the south, Ossola valley on the east and Rhone valley on the north. It is separated from the Mont Blanc Massif by the Val Ferret, and the Lepontine Alps by the Simplon Pass. The black line demarks the Swiss-Italian and Swiss-French borders.

The main chain watershed (between the Mediterranean Sea and the Adriatic Sea) runs from west to east on the border between Italy (south) and Switzerland (north). From Mont Vélan, the first high summit east of St Bernard Pass, the chain rarely goes below 3,000 ft (910 m) and contains many four-thousanders such as Matterhorn and Monte Rosa. The valleys are quite similar on both side of the border, being generally oriented perpendicular to the main chain and descending progressively into the Rhône Valley on the north and the Aosta Valley on the south. Unlike many other mountain ranges, the higher peaks (Grand Combin, Weisshorn, Mischabel, Weissmies) are often located outside the main chain, lying between the northern valleys.

== Peaks ==
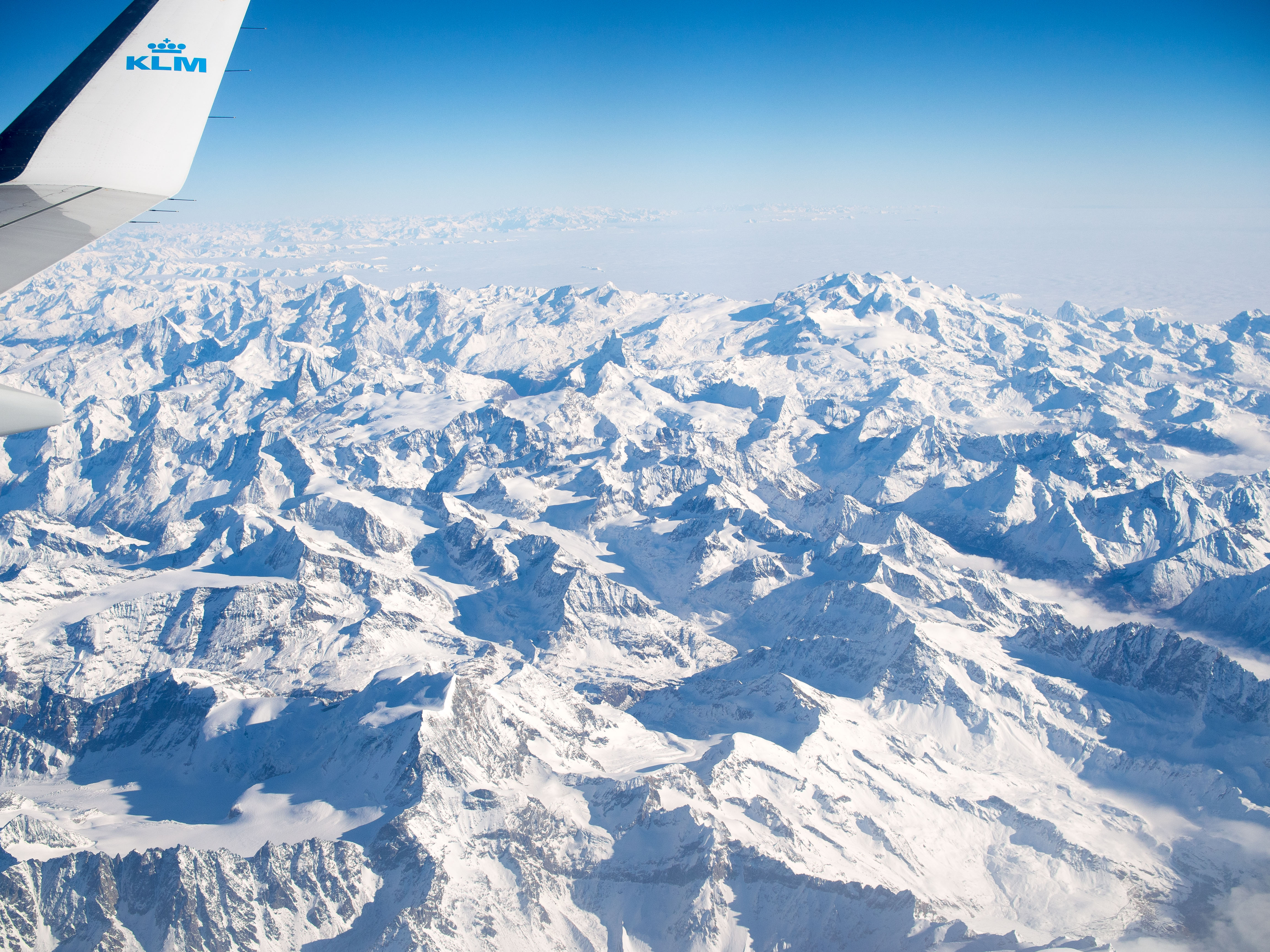
Aerial view of the Pennine Alps from a plane above Mont Blanc (Monte Bianco)

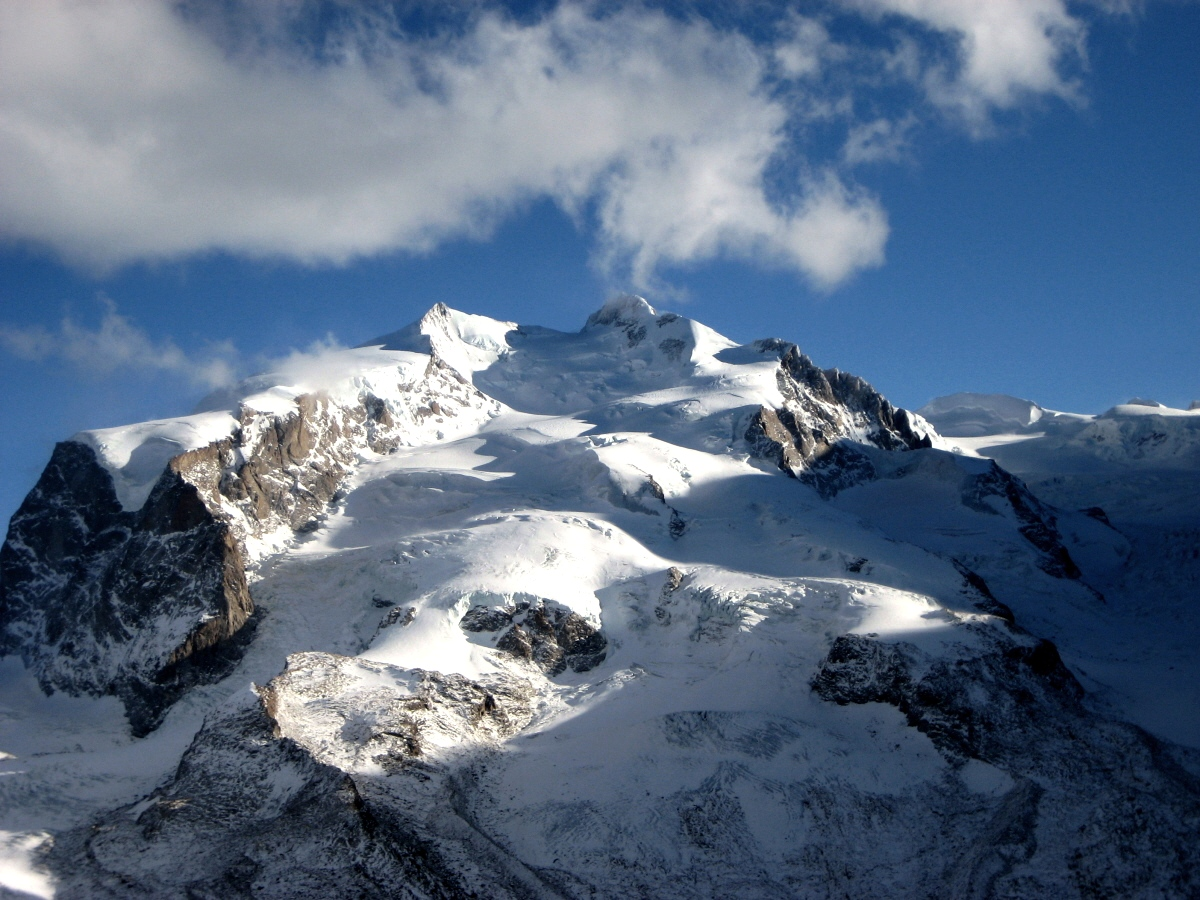
Monte Rosa

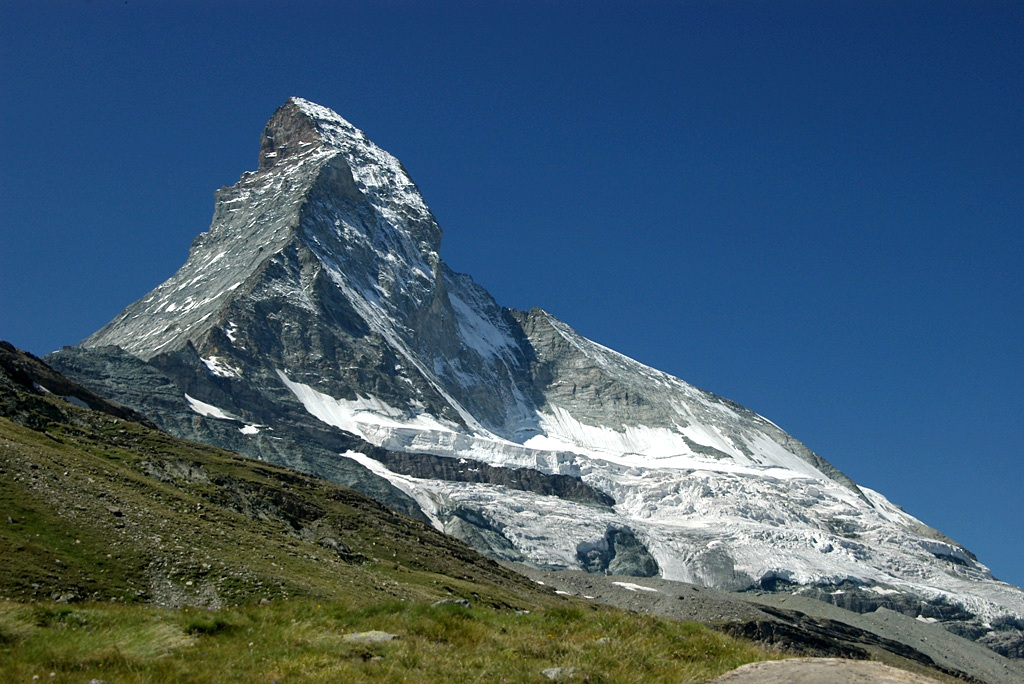
Matterhorn (Cervino)

There are 126 peaks over 2,106 m (6,909 ft) in the Pennine Alps. The chief peaks are:

=== Over 4,634 m (15,203 ft) ===
Name	Height
Dufourspitze	4,634 m (15,203 ft)
Nordend	4,608 m (15,118 ft)
Zumsteinspitze	4,563 m (14,970 ft)
Signalkuppe	4,554 m (14,941 ft)
Dom	4,546 m (14,915 ft)
Liskamm	4,532 m (14,869 ft)
Weisshorn	4,505 m (14,780 ft)
Täschhorn	4,491 m (14,734 ft)
Matterhorn	4,478 m (14,692 ft)
Parrotspitze	4,434 m (14,547 ft)
Dent Blanche	4,357 m (14,295 ft)
Nadelhorn	4,327 m (14,196 ft)
Grand Combin	4,309 m (14,137 ft)
Lenzspitze	4,294 m (14,088 ft)
Stecknadelhorn	4,240 m (13,911 ft)
Castor	4,225 m (13,862 ft)
Zinalrothorn	4,221 m (13,848 ft)
Hohberghorn	4,218 m (13,839 ft)
Alphubel	4,206 m (13,799 ft)
Rimpfischhorn	4,199 m (13,776 ft)
Strahlhorn	4,190 m (13,747 ft)
Dent d'Hérens	4,173 m (13,691 ft)
Breithorn	4,160 m (13,648 ft)
Bishorn	4,151 m (13,619 ft)
Breithornzwillinge	4,138 m (13,576 ft)
Pollux	4,089 m (13,415 ft)
Ober Gabelhorn	4,063 m (13,330 ft)
Dürrenhorn	4,035 m (13,238 ft)
Allalinhorn	4,027 m (13,212 ft)
Weissmies	4,013 m (13,166 ft)
Lagginhorn	4,010 m (13,156 ft)
Fletschhorn	3,985 m (13,074 ft)
Adlerhorn	3,988 m (13,084 ft)
Schalihorn	3,974 m (13,038 ft)
Jägerhorn	3,970 m (13,025 ft)
Grand Cornier	3,962 m (12,999 ft)
Ulrichshorn	3,925 m (12,877 ft)
Wellenkuppe	3,898 m (12,789 ft)
Feechopf	3,888 m (12,756 ft)
Klein Matterhorn	3,883 m (12,740 ft)
Pointe du Mountet	3,877 m (12,720 ft)
La Ruinette	3,875 m (12,713 ft)

=== Between 3,204 and 4,634 m (10,512 to 15,203 ft) ===
Name	Height
Mont Blanc de Cheilon	3,870 m (12,697 ft)
Bouquetins	3,838 m (12,592 ft)
Tour de Boussine	3,833 m (12,575 ft)
Brunegghorn	3,831 m (12,569 ft)
Balfrin	3,796 m (12,454 ft)
Cima di Jazzi	3,792 m (12,441 ft)
Pigne d'Arolla	3,787 m (12,425 ft)
Mont Vélan	3,765 m (12,352 ft)
Kinhorn	3,750 m (12,303 ft)
L'Évêque	3,738 m (12,264 ft)
Tête Blanche	3,710 m (12,172 ft)
Le Pleureur	3,706 m (12,159 ft)
Aiguille de la Tsa	3,668 m (12,034 ft)
Besso	3,667 m (12,031 ft)
Mont Collon	3,637 m (11,932 ft)
Les Diablons	3,605 m (11,827 ft)
Pointes de Mourti	3,564 m (11,693 ft)
Le Ritord	3,556 m (11,667 ft)
Dents de Bertol	3,547 m (11,637 ft)
Mont Gelé	3,518 m (11,542 ft)
Petite Aiguille	3,517 m (11,539 ft)
Becca di Luseney	3,506 m (11,503 ft)
Château des Dames	3,489 m (11,447 ft)
Tällihorn	3,448 m (11,312 ft)
Pigne de la Lé	3,396 m (11,142 ft)
Grand Tournalin	3,379 m (11,086 ft)
Rosablanche	3,348 m (10,984 ft)
Wasuhorn	3,343 m (10,968 ft)
Mont Avril	3,341 m (10,961 ft)
Almagellhorn	3,327 m (10,915 ft)
Grande Rochère	3,326 m (10,912 ft)
Corno Bianco	3,320 m (10,892 ft)
Testa Grigia	3,315 m (10,876 ft)
La Cassorte	3,301 m (10,830 ft)
Böshorn	3,268 m (10,722 ft)
Le Parrain	3,259 m (10,692 ft)
Sasseneire	3,259 m (10,692 ft)
Bösentrift	3,248 m (10,656 ft)
Festihorn	3,248 m (10,656 ft)
Grand Golliat	3,240 m (10,630 ft)
Jazzihorn	3,227 m (10,587 ft)
Pizzo Bianco	3,216 m (10,551 ft)
Mont de la Gouille	3,212 m (10,538 ft)
Latelhorn	3,207 m (10,522 ft)
Jegihorn	3,206 m (10,518 ft)
Schwarzhorn	3,204 m (10,512 ft)

=== Between 2,106 and 3,190 m (6,909 to 10,466 ft) ===
Name	Height
Lammenhorn	3,190 m (10,466 ft)
Gornergrat	3,136 m (10,289 ft)
Pointe d'Ar Pitetta	3,133 m (10,279 ft)
Corno di Faller	3,128 m (10,262 ft)
Frilihorn	3,124 m (10,249 ft)
Mont Rogneux	3,084 m (10,118 ft)
Le Boudri	3,070 m (10,072 ft)
Mont Néry	3,070 m (10,072 ft)
Seetalhorn	3,037 m (9,964 ft)
Bella Tola	3,028 m (9,934 ft)
Corno Bussola	3,023 m (9,918 ft)
Le Toûno	3,018 m (9,902 ft)
Sparruhorn	2,988 m (9,803 ft)
Monte Tagliaferro	2,964 m (9,724 ft)
Pointe de Barasson	2,963 m (9,721 ft)
Mont Blava	2,932 m (9,619 ft)
Riffelhorn	2,931 m (9,616 ft)
Palanche de la Cretta	2,927 m (9,603 ft)
Bec de la Montau	2,922 m (9,587 ft)
Ochsehorn	2,912 m (9,554 ft)
Signalhorn	2,911 m (9,551 ft)
Sex de Marinda	2,906 m (9,534 ft)
Aiguille des Angroniettes	2,885 m (9,465 ft)
Balmahorn	2,870 m (9,416 ft)
Roc d'Orzival	2,853 m (9,360 ft)
Le Mourin	2,766 m (9,075 ft)
Pletschuhorn	2,751 m (9,026 ft)
Becca de Corbassière	2,749 m (9,019 ft)
Cima del Rosso	2,624 m (8,609 ft)
Wenghorn	2,587 m (8,488 ft)
Cima di Bo	2,556 m (8,386 ft)
Ergischhorn	2,526 m (8,287 ft)
Glishorn	2,525 m (8,284 ft)
Crêta de Vella	2,519 m (8,264 ft)
Six Blanc	2,445 m (8,022 ft)
Cima Verosso	2,444 m (8,018 ft)
Guggilihorn	2,351 m (7,713 ft)
Testa di Comagna	2,106 m (6,909 ft)

== Glaciers ==
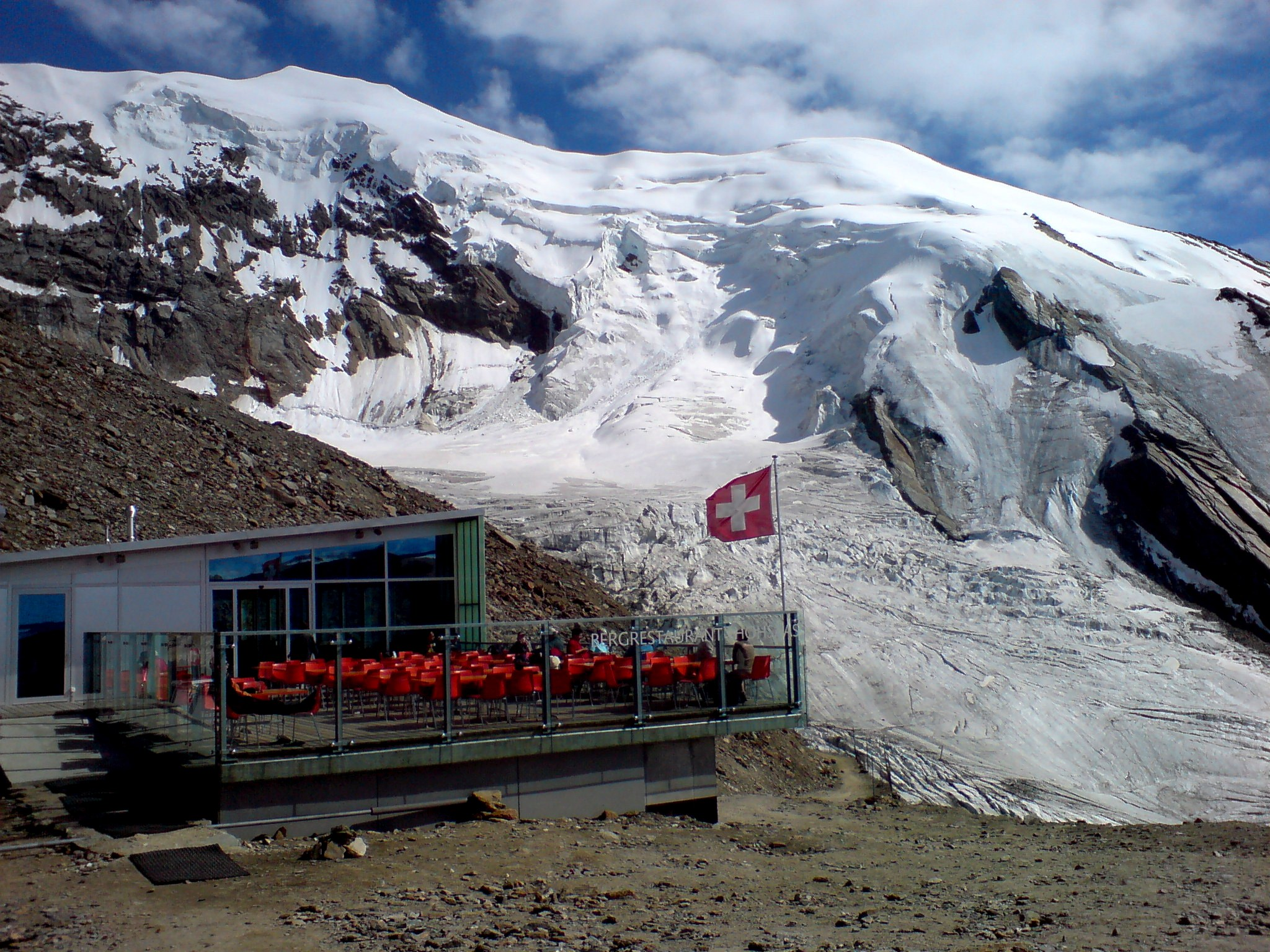
Weissmies

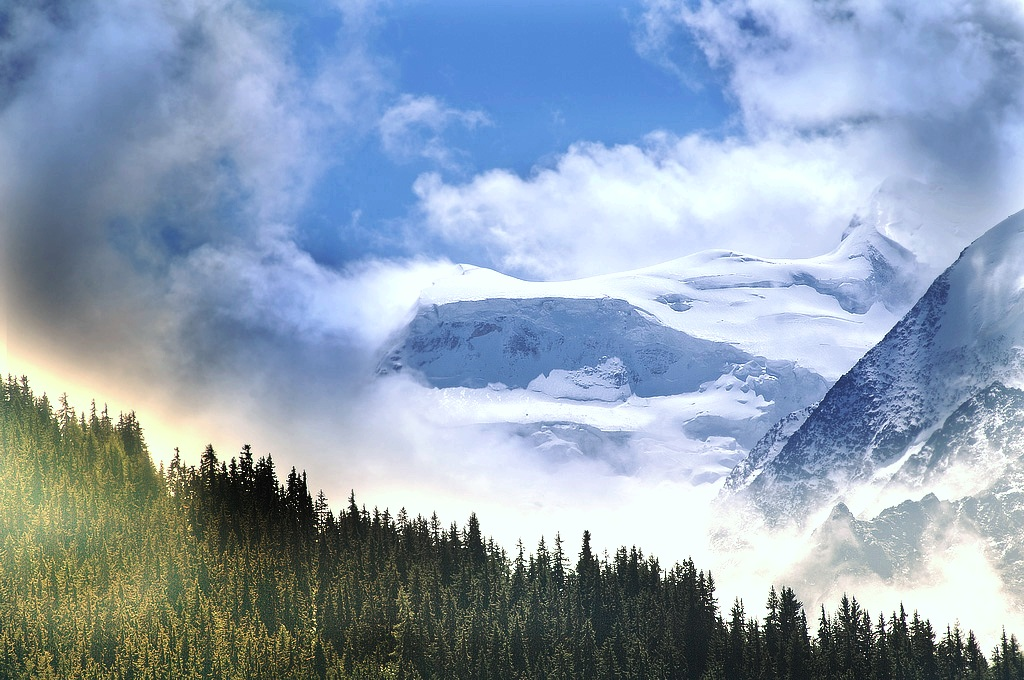
Grand Combin

Main glaciers:

- Gorner Glacier
- Corbassière Glacier
- Findel Glacier
- Zmutt Glacier
- Zinal Glacier
- Otemma Glacier
- Allalin Glacier
- Ferpècle Glacier
- Fee Glacier
- Mont Miné Glacier
- Ried Glacier
- Turtmann Glacier
- Moiry Glacier
- Arolla Glacier
- Moming Glacier
- Cheilon Glacier
- Rossbode Glacier

== Passes ==
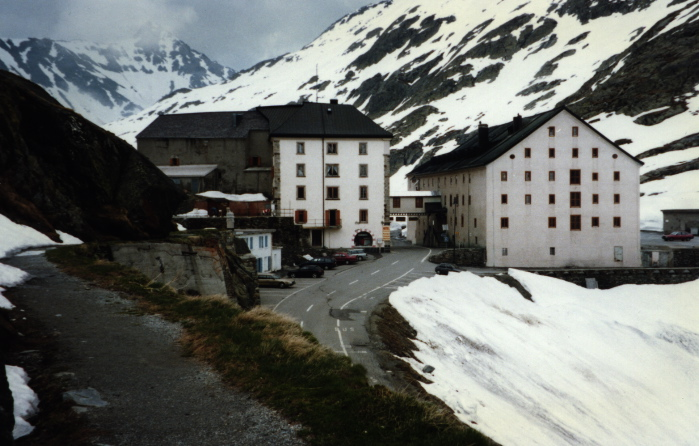
Great St Bernard Pass

The chief passes of the Pennine Alps are:

Mountain pass	location	type	elevation	
Sesiajoch	Zermatt to Alagna	snow	4,424	14,515
Domjoch	Randa to Saas-Fee	snow	4,286	14,062
Lisjoch	Zermatt to Gressoney-La-Trinité	snow	4,277	14,033
Mischabeljoch	Zermatt to Saas-Fee	snow	3,856	12,651
Alphubel Pass	Zermatt to Saas-Fee	snow	3,802	12,474
Adler Pass	Zermatt to Saas-Fee	snow	3,798	12,461
Moming Pass	Zermatt to Zinal	snow	3,745	12,287
Schwarztor	Zermatt to Ayas	snow	3,741	12,274
Ried Pass	Sankt-Niklaus to Saas-Fee	snow	3,597	11,800
Neues Weisstor	Zermatt to Macugnaga	snow	3,580	11,746
Allalin Pass	Zermatt to Saas-Fee	snow	3,570	11,713
Col de Valpelline	Zermatt to Aosta	snow	3,562	11,687
Biesjoch	Randa to Turtmann	snow	3,549	11,644
Triftjoch	Zermatt to Zinal	snow	3,540	11,615
Col du Sonadon	Bourg-Saint-Pierre to the Val de Bagnes	snow	3,489	11,447
Col d'Herens	Zermatt to Evolène	snow	3,480	11,418
Col Durand	Zermatt to Zinal	snow	3,474	11,398
Col des Maisons Blanches	Bourg-Saint-Pierre to the Val de Bagnes	snow	3,426	11,241
Col de Bertol	Arolla to the Col d'Herens	snow	3,414	11,200
Col du Mont Rouge	Val de Bagnes to the Val d'Hérémence	snow	3,341	10,962
Theodulpass	Zermatt to Valtournenche	snow	3,322	10,899
Col de Tracuit	Zinal to Turtmann	snow	3,252	10,670
Zwischbergen Pass	Saas-Fee to Gondo	snow	3,248	10,657
Col d'Oren	Val de Bagnes to the Valpelline	snow	3,242	10,637
Col de Seilon	Val de Bagnes to the Val d'Hérémence	snow	3,200	10,499
Col du Cret	Val de Bagnes to the Val d'Hérémence	snow	3,148	10,329
Col de Valcournera	Valtournenche to the Valpelline	snow	3,147	10,325
Col de Collon	Arolla to Aosta	snow	3,130	10,270
Col de Valsorey	Bourg-Saint-Pierre to Aosta	snow	3,113	10'214
Col de Chermontane	Val de Bagnes to Arolla	snow	3084	10,119
Cimes Blanches	Valtournenche to Ayas	bridle path	2,980	9,777
Col de Torrent	Evolène to the Val de Torrent	bridle path	2,924	9,593
Augstbord Pass	Sankt-Niklaus to Turtmann	bridle path	2,893	9,492
Col de Crête Sèche	Val de Bagnes to the Valpelline	snow	2,888	9,475
Col d'Olen	Alagna to Gressoney	bridle path	2,871	9,420
Monte Moro	Saas-Fee to Macugnaga	bridle path	2,862	9,390
Pas de Chevres	Arolla to the Val d'Hérémence	footpath	2,851	9,354
Antrona Pass	Saas-Fee to Antrona	bridle path	2,844	9,331
Col de Sorebois	Zinal to the Val de Torrent	bridle path	2,825	9,269
Col de Vessona	Valpelline to Nus	footpath	2,794	9,167
Fenêtre de Durand	Val de Bagnes to Aosta	bridle path	2,786	9,141
Z'Meiden Pass	Zinal to Turtmann	bridle path	2,772	9,095
Turlo Pass	Alagna to Macugnaga	footpath	2,736	8,977
Fenêtre de Ferret	Great St Bernard to the Swiss Val Ferret	bridle path	2,699	8,855
Bettaforca Pass (Bättforko)	Ayas to Gressoney-La-Trinité	bridle path	2,676	8,780
Col Serena	Great St Bernard to Morgex	footpath	2,538	8,327
Col Ferret	Courmayeur to Orsières	bridle path	2,533	8,311
Col de Valdobbia	Gressoney to the Val Sesia	bridle path	2,479	8,134
Great St Bernard	Martigny to Aosta	road	2,472	8,111
Col de Moud	Alagna to Rima	bridle path	2,323	7,622
Col d'Egua	Rima to the Valle Anzasca	bridle path	2,236	7,336
Simplon Pass	Brig to Domodossola	road	2,009	6,592
Bocchetta del Croso	Piedicavallo to Valsesia	bridle path	1,941	6,374
Baranca Pass	Varallo to the Val Anzasca	bridle path	1,820	5,971

== Nature conservation ==
Some regional nature parks, like the Parco Naturale Alta Valsesia (6,511 ha - Piedmont, IT), the Mont Mars Nature Reserve (390 ha - Aosta Valley, IT) and the Regional park of Binn valley (15,891 ha - Valais, CH), have been established on both sides of the main water divide.

== Maps ==
SwissTopo map of the Western Alps, centred on the Pennine Alps. The Mont Blanc Massif is visible in the west with the Bernese Alps to the north and Lepontine Alps to the north-east. The Ossola, Aosta, Ferret and Rhone valleys form its eastern, southern, western and northern boundaries. The Col Ferret and separates it from the Mont Blanc Massif, as does the Simplon Pass from the Lepontine Alps. At its centre is the Mattertal with its highest point, Dufourspitze, slightly southeast at the border with Italy. The thick red line demarks the French-Swiss and Swiss-Italian borders.

== See also ==
- Alpi Cusiane
- Biellese Alps
- Swiss Alps
- SOIUSA
- Western Alps

== Maps ==
- Swiss official cartography (Swiss Federal Office of Topography - Swisstopo); on-line version: map.geo.admin.ch
- Italian official cartography (Istituto Geografico Militare - IGM); on-line version: www.pcn.minambiente.it
