= Val d'Anniviers =

Valley in Sierre, Switzerland

- Eifischtal
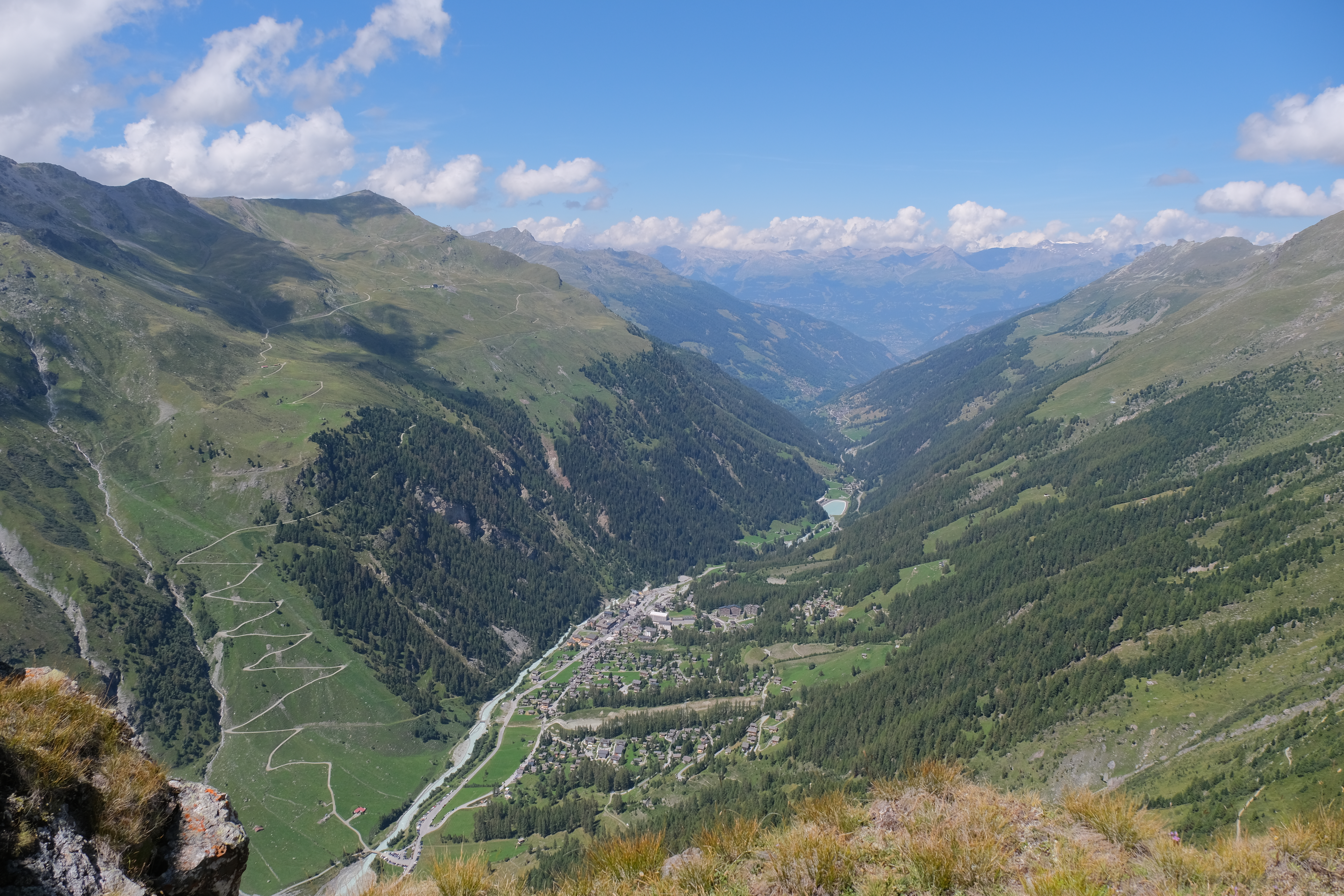
- Val d'Anniviers seen from the Roc de la Vache.

- Location within Canton of Valais
- Length: 35 km (22 mi) North

Geology
- Type: U-shaped valley

Geography
- Location: Anniviers, Sierre District, Valais, Switzerland
- Coordinates: 46°12′N 7°35′E
- Rivers: Navizence
- Interactive map of Val d'Anniviers

The Val d'Anniviers (old name in German Eifischtal) is a Swiss Alpine valley, situated in the district of Sierre in Valais, which extends south of the Rhône Valley, on the northern slopes of the Pennine Alps. The valley was home to six municipalities: Ayer, Chandolin, Grimentz, Saint-Jean, Saint-Luc and Vissoie. The citizens of those municipalities agreed on November 26, 2006, to merge into one, which was named Anniviers. The merger took place in January 2009.

== Toponymy ==
The name of the valley has changed little during its history: "vallis Annivesii" before 1052, then "de Anivesio" in 1193, "Annivies" in 1215, "Anives" in 1243 and "Annevié" in 1253.

The origin and meaning of the name "Anniviers" are uncertain and have been interpreted in different ways from Latin. According to the sociologist Bernard Crettaz, it would find its origin in the seasonal migration of its inhabitants between the mountain and the plain: the etymology would refer to "Anni viae", meaning "year on the paths", "paths of the year" or "work of the year". The other possible interpretations are, among others, "Ad nives" ("towards the snows") or "Anni visio" ("visit of the year", in reference to the annual visit of the bishop).

In the local variety of Arpitan, Anniviers is called "Anivyè". The German form "Eifischtal", still used in some publications, would have similar origins to that in French; however, it has no connection with fish (Fisch in German).

The inhabitants of the valley are called the Anniviards.

== Geography ==
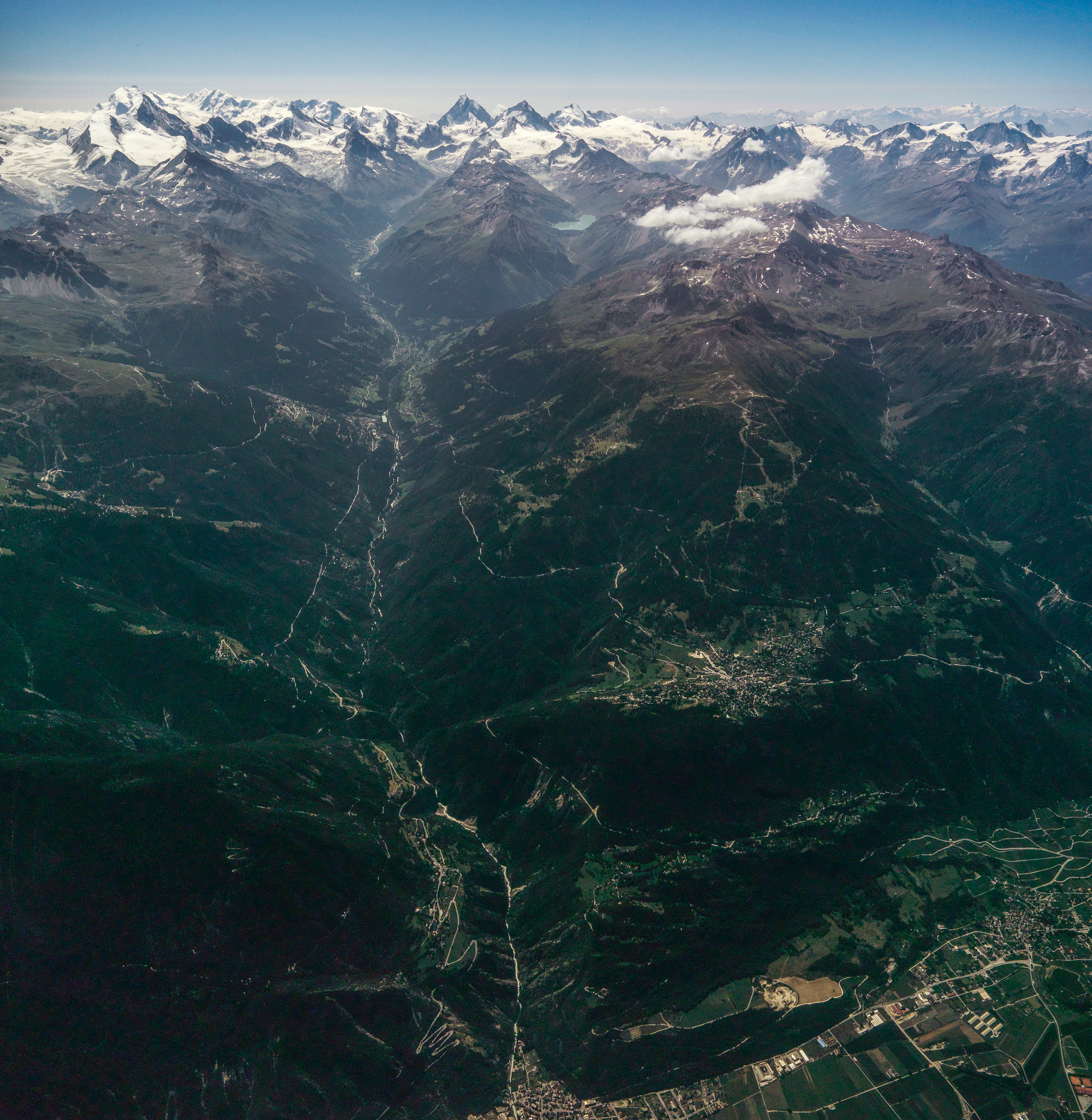
The Val d'Anniviers seen from the air in 1994

=== Situation ===
The Val d'Anniviers is located in the canton of Valais and is one of the seven large valleys of the Swiss Rhône Valley. It is located on the left bank of the Rhône, between the Vallon de Réchy and the Illgraben and opposite Sierre. It begins at Chippis, at an altitude of 550 meters (1,800 ft), in narrow gorges, and its highest point is at the top of the Weisshorn, at an altitude of 4,500 meters (14,800 ft).

=== Seismicity, landslides and avalanches ===
The Val d'Anniviers is located in seismic risk zone 3b, the category of the most exposed regions in Switzerland. The valley is also in a high avalanche risk zone.

The Val d'Anniviers has experienced a number of natural disasters. The oldest known dates back to the 6th century when, after heavy snowfalls during the winter followed by long storms and torrential rains in the spring, a section of the Tsirouc mountain collapsed on the village of Morasses. In 1817, the village of Mayoux was also destroyed, this time by an avalanche: three consecutive very cold winters created a basin of snow at 2,500 meters (8,200 ft), under the Roc d'Orzival. By freeing itself due to spring warming and thunderstorms, the basin gave way to a second avalanche, two days later, coming from the face of the Roc d'Orzival and ending in the village.

== Bibliography ==
- Crettaz, Bernard (1979). lastades et sédentaires dans le Val d'Anniviers (in French). Genève: éditions Grounauer. p. 459.
- Fenner, Martin (2015). Val d'Anniviers : Tradition et Mutations (in French). Sierre: Éditions Monographic. ISBN 978-2-88341-230-9.
- Knapp, Charles; Borel, Maurice; Attinger, V. (1902). "Anniviers (val des ou val d')". Dictionnaire géographique de la Suisse : Aa - Engadine (PDF) (in French). Neuchâtel: Société neuchâteloise de géographie. pp. 69–70.
- Monod, Jules (2004). Sierre et le val d'Anniviers (in French). Sierre: Éditions à la Carte. p. 148. ISBN 2-88464-581-0.
- Solandieu (1910). "Le Val d'Anniviers". Le Valais pittoresque (PDF) (in French). Lausanne: L. Martinet. pp. 97–104.
- Wildi, Walter (2019). Zinal : histoire naturelle et présence humaine (PDF) (in French). Le Grand-Saconnex: Département F.-A. Forel des sciences de l’environnement et de l’eau.
- Zufferey, Doctor Erasme (1927). Le Passé du Val d'Anniviers (in French). Haute-Savoie: Société d'imprimeurs d'Ambilly-Annemasse.
