= Mayoux =

Swiss village

Coordinates: 46°13′00″N 007°35′00″E

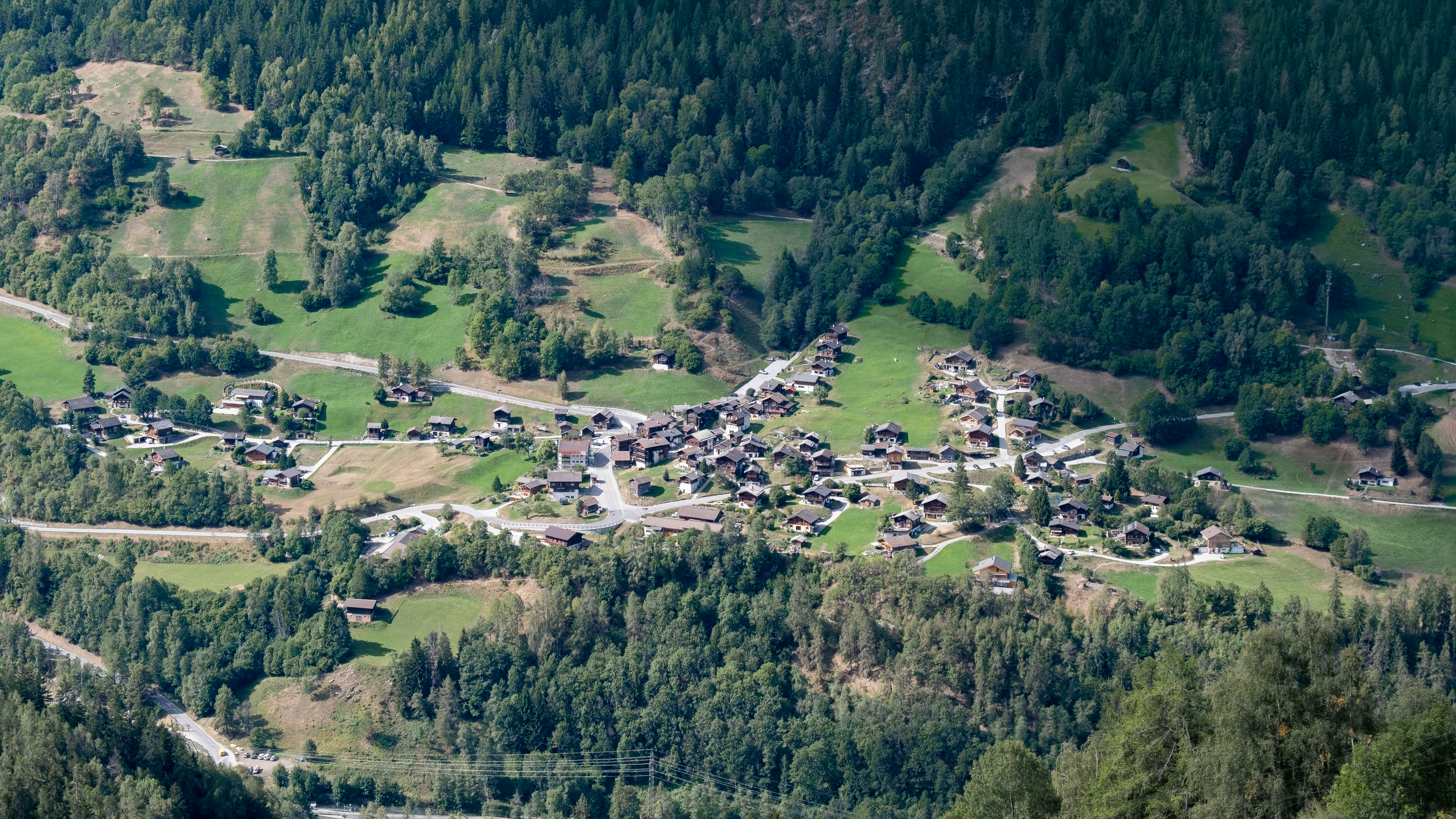
Mayoux as seen from Saint-Luc

Mayoux is a village in Valais, Switzerland.

== See also ==
- Anniviers
- Saint-Luc
- Vissoie
