= Roc d'Orzival =

Mountain in Switzerland

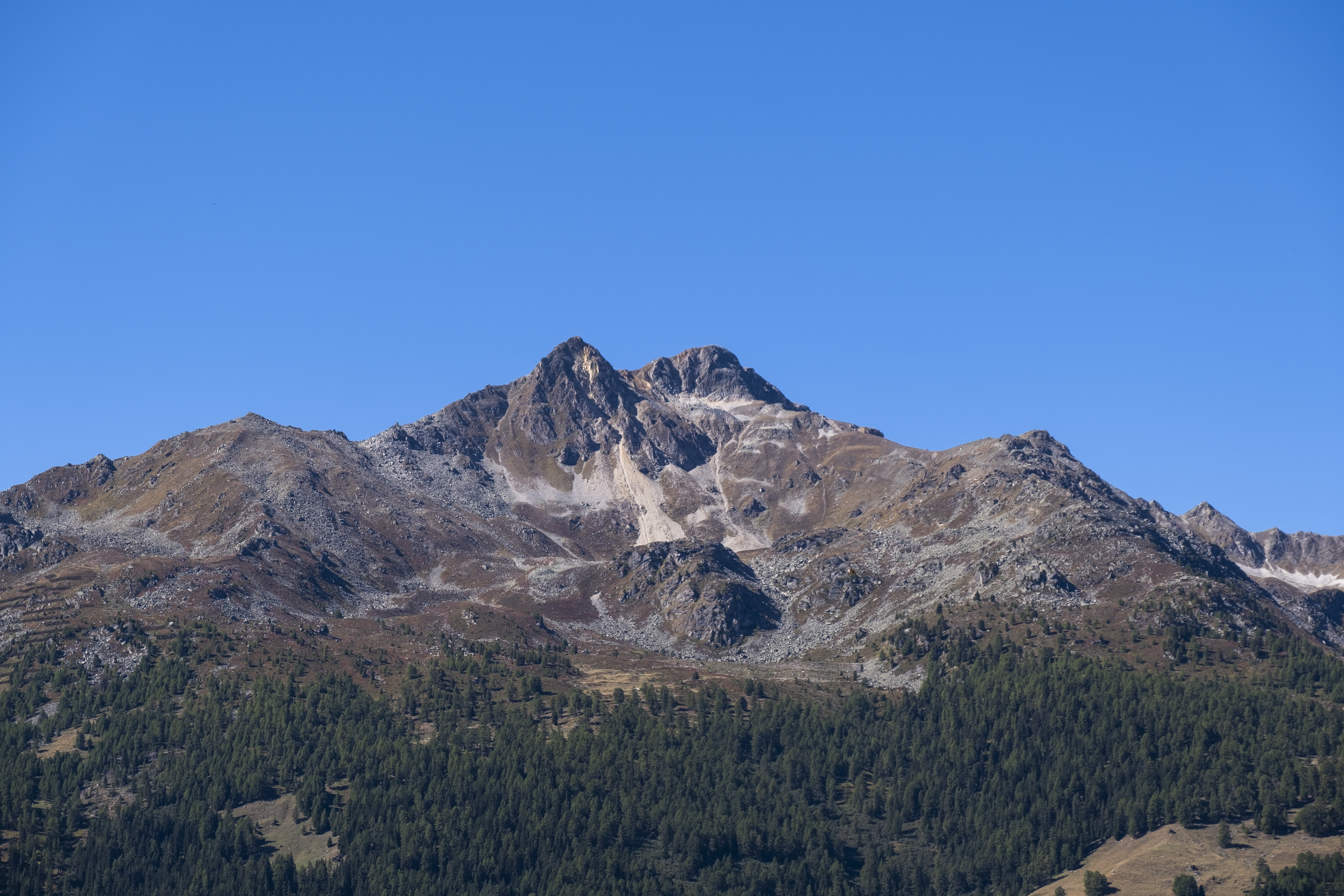

Highest point
- Elevation: 2,853 m (9,360 ft)
- Prominence: 105 m (344 ft)
- Coordinates: 46°11′42.7″N 7°32′16.9″E

Geography
- Location within Switzerland
- Location: Valais, Switzerland
- Parent range: Pennine Alps

The Roc d'Orzival is a mountain of the Swiss Pennine Alps, overlooking Grimentz in the canton of Valais. It lies north of the Becs de Bosson, on the chain between the Val de Réchy and the Val d'Anniviers.
