= Mayoux (surname) =

Mayoux is a surname. Notable people with the surname include:

- François Mayoux (1882–1967), French teacher, communist revolutionary syndicalist. Husband of Marie Mayoux
- Marie Mayoux (1878–1969), French teacher, revolutionary syndicalist, pacifist and libertarian

== See also ==
- Mayoux, a village in Valais, Switzerland
