= Chalais, Switzerland =

Chalais
- Municipality
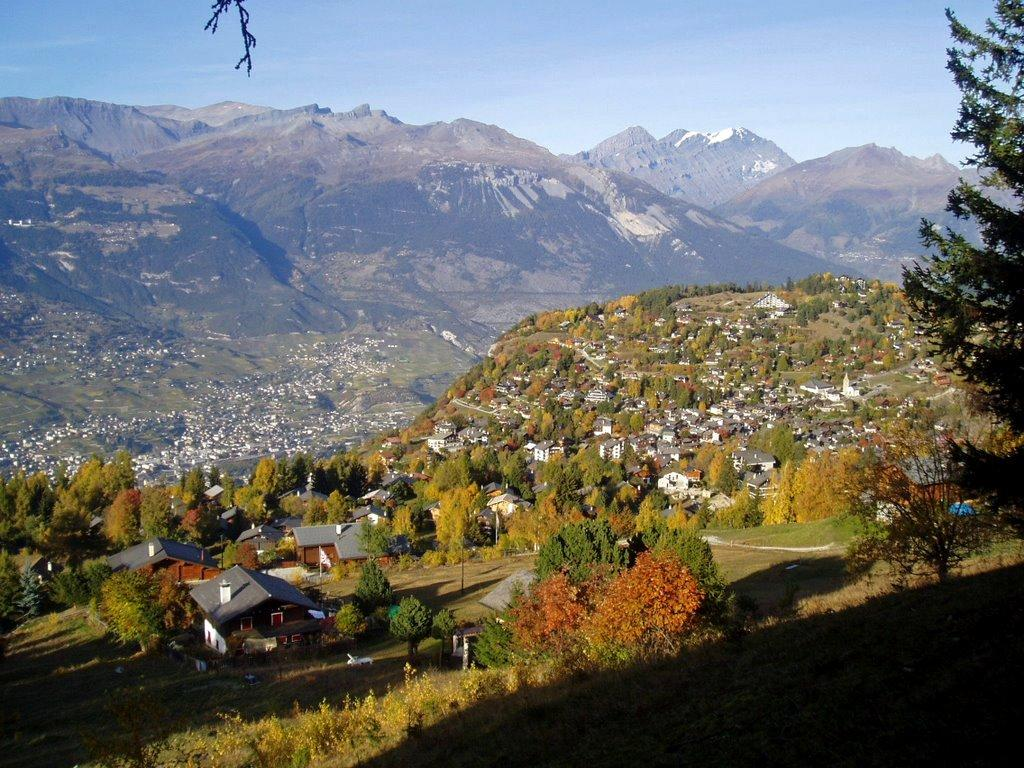
- Vercorin village

- Flag Coat of arms
- Location of Chalais
- Location within Switzerland Location within Canton of Valais
- Coordinates: 46°16′N 7°30′E
- Country: Switzerland
- Canton: Valais
- District: Sierre

Government
  - Mayor: Alain Perruchoud

Area
  - Total: 24.5 km^{2} (9.5 sq mi)
- Elevation: 557 m (1,827 ft)

Population (December 2002)
  - Total: 2,650
  - Density: 108/km^{2} (280/sq mi)
- Time zone: UTC+01:00 (CET)
  - Summer (DST): UTC+02:00 (CEST)
- Postal code: 3966
- SFOS number: 6232
- ISO 3166 code: CH-VS
- Surrounded by: Anniviers, Chippis, Grône, Sierre
- Website: www.chalais.ch

Chalais (French pronunciation: [ʃalɛ]) is a municipality in the district of Sierre in the canton of Valais in Switzerland.

== History ==
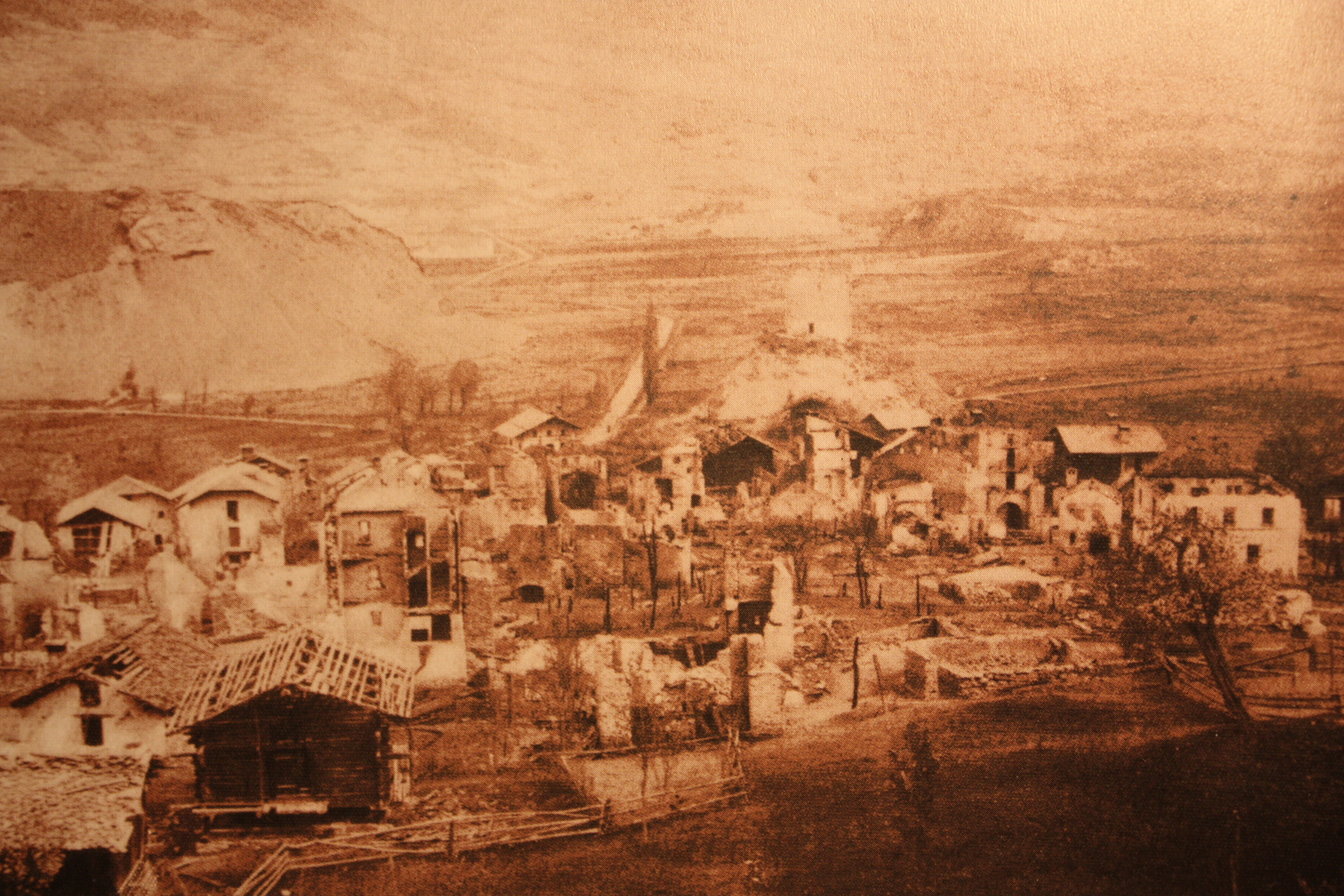
Chalais after the 1892 fire.

Chalais is first mentioned in the 11th century as Jaler. In 1425 it was mentioned as Challir.

In 1892 much of the village was destroyed in a fire.

== Geography ==
Chalais has an area, as of 2009, of 24.5 square kilometers (9.5 mi^{2}). Of this area, 4.65 km^{2} (1.80 mi^{2}) or 19.0% is used for agricultural purposes, while 16.55 km^{2} (6.39 mi^{2}) or 67.7% is forested. Of the rest of the land, 2.07 km^{2} (0.80 mi^{2}) or 8.5% is settled (buildings or roads), 0.02 km^{2} (4.9 acres) or 0.1% is either rivers or lakes and 1.16 km^{2} (0.45 mi^{2}) or 4.7% is unproductive land.

Of the built up area, housing and buildings made up 5.4% and transportation infrastructure made up 1.9%. Out of the forested land, 64.3% of the total land area is heavily forested and 3.1% is covered with orchards or small clusters of trees. Of the agricultural land, 0.4% is used for growing crops and 4.3% is pastures, while 4.7% is used for orchards or vine crops and 9.6% is used for alpine pastures. All the water in the municipality is flowing water. Of the unproductive areas, 3.0% is unproductive vegetation and 1.8% is too rocky for vegetation.

The municipality is located in the Sierre district, on the left side of the Rhone river. It consists of the villages of Chalais and Réchy on the edge of the valley along with Brie and Vercorin on a terrace in the mountains.

== Coat of arms ==
The blazon of the municipal coat of arms is Argent, between a Cross pattee Vert overall four Mullets of Five Gules.

== Demographics ==
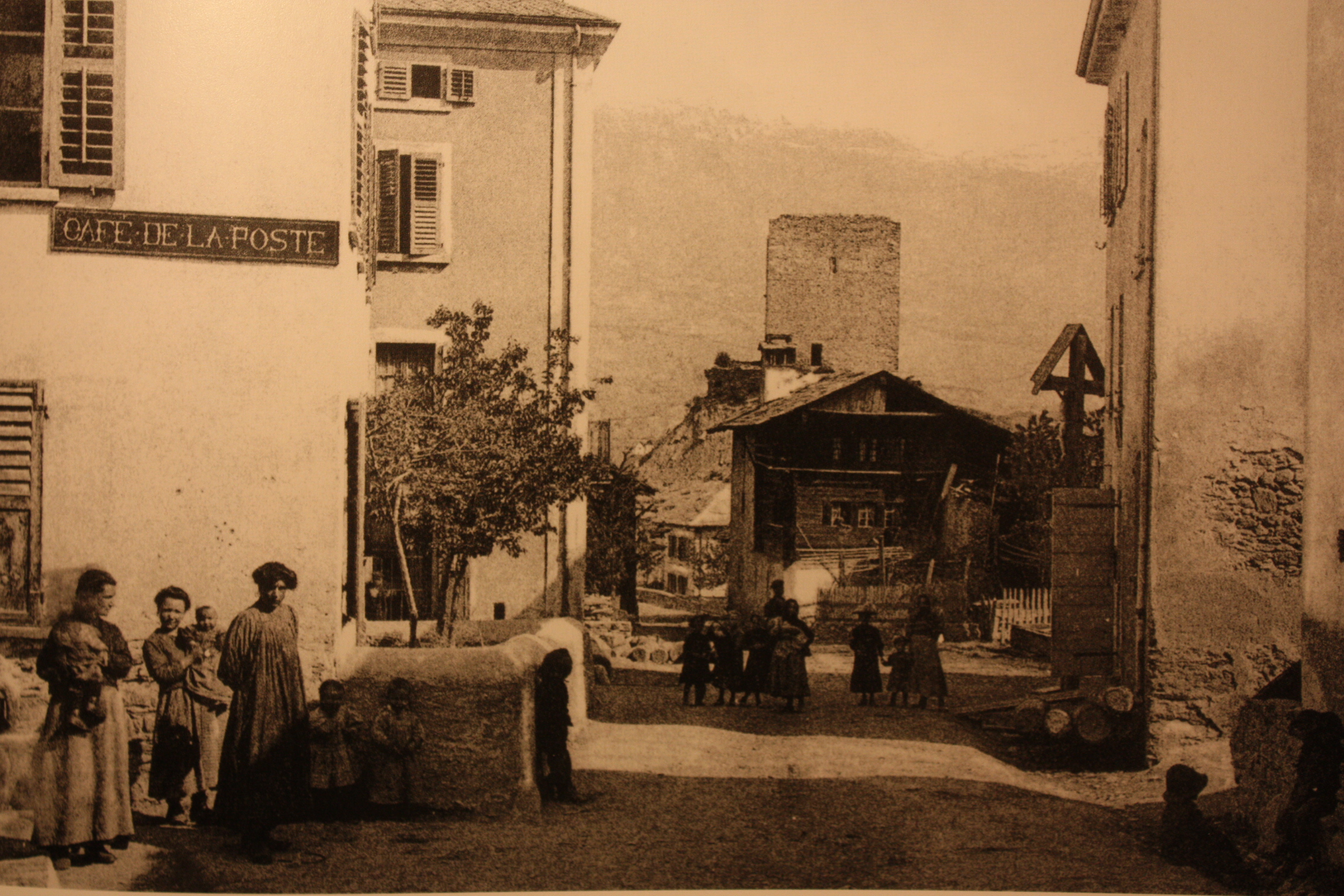
Rue de la Poste in Chalais in 1927

Historic aerial photograph by Werner Friedli from 1949

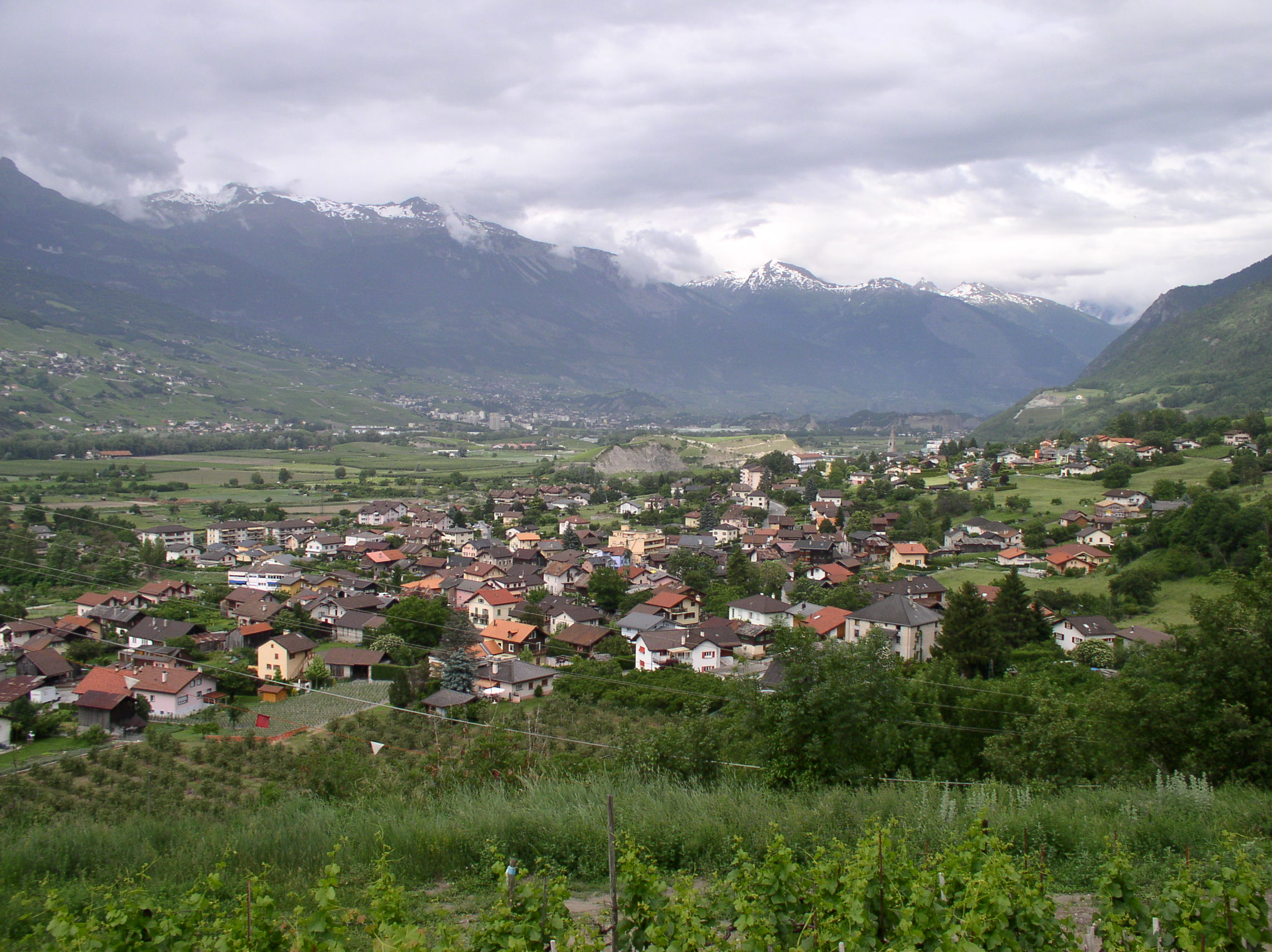
Réchy village

Chalais has a population (as of December 2020) of 3,606. As of 2008, 15.0% of the population are resident foreign nationals. Over the last 10 years (2000–2010 ) the population has changed at a rate of 17.9%. It has changed at a rate of 14.1% due to migration and at a rate of 0.3% due to births and deaths.

Most of the population (as of 2000) speaks French (2,397 or 90.2%) as their first language, German is the second most common (116 or 4.4%) and Italian is the third (59 or 2.2%). There is 1 person who speaks Romansh.

As of 2008, the population was 49.8% male and 50.2% female. The population was made up of 1,294 Swiss men (41.4% of the population) and 260 (8.3%) non-Swiss men. There were 1,336 Swiss women (42.8%) and 232 (7.4%) non-Swiss women. Of the population in the municipality, 1,194 or about 44.9% were born in Chalais and lived there in 2000. There were 753 or 28.3% who were born in the same canton, while 238 or 9.0% were born somewhere else in Switzerland, and 372 or 14.0% were born outside of Switzerland.

As of 2000, children and teenagers (0–19 years old) make up 24% of the population, while adults (20–64 years old) make up 60.1% and seniors (over 64 years old) make up 15.9%.

As of 2000, there were 1,020 people who were single and never married in the municipality. There were 1,375 married individuals, 156 widows or widowers and 106 individuals who are divorced.

As of 2000, there were 1,045 private households in the municipality, and an average of 2.4 persons per household. There were 308 households that consist of only one person and 74 households with five or more people. In 2000, a total of 922 apartments (43.5% of the total) were permanently occupied, while 1,084 apartments (51.2%) were seasonally occupied and 112 apartments (5.3%) were empty. As of 2009, the construction rate of new housing units was 6.4 new units per 1000 residents. The vacancy rate for the municipality, in 2010, was 0.13%.

The historical population is given in the following chart:

== Politics ==
In the 2007 federal election the most popular party was the CVP which received 28.67% of the vote. The next three most popular parties were the FDP (22.21%), the SP (21.19%) and the SVP (18.15%). In the federal election, a total of 1,172 votes were cast, and the voter turnout was 57.4%.

In the 2009 Conseil d'État/Staatsrat election a total of 1,280 votes were cast, of which 75 or about 5.9% were invalid. The voter participation was 61.8%, which is much more than the cantonal average of 54.67%. In the 2007 Swiss Council of States election a total of 1,164 votes were cast, of which 70 or about 6.0% were invalid. The voter participation was 57.7%, which is similar to the cantonal average of 59.88%.

== Economy ==
As of 2010, Chalais had an unemployment rate of 3.9%. As of 2008, there were 76 people employed in the primary economic sector and about 36 businesses involved in this sector. 197 people were employed in the secondary sector and there were 40 businesses in this sector. 408 people were employed in the tertiary sector, with 83 businesses in this sector. There were 1,297 residents of the municipality who were employed in some capacity, of which females made up 42.6% of the workforce.

In 2008 the total number of full-time equivalent jobs was 540. The number of jobs in the primary sector was 47, of which 34 were in agriculture and 13 were in forestry or lumber production. The number of jobs in the secondary sector was 188 of which 89 or (47.3%) were in manufacturing and 98 (52.1%) were in construction. The number of jobs in the tertiary sector was 305. In the tertiary sector; 75 or 24.6% were in wholesale or retail sales or the repair of motor vehicles, 19 or 6.2% were in the movement and storage of goods, 53 or 17.4% were in a hotel or restaurant, 7 or 2.3% were the insurance or financial industry, 23 or 7.5% were technical professionals or scientists, 21 or 6.9% were in education and 59 or 19.3% were in health care.

In 2000, there were 230 workers who commuted into the municipality and 876 workers who commuted away. The municipality is a net exporter of workers, with about 3.8 workers leaving the municipality for every one entering. Of the working population, 8.4% used public transportation to get to work, and 74.6% used a private car.

== Religion ==
From the 2000 census, 2,222 or 83.6% were Roman Catholic, while 87 or 3.3% belonged to the Swiss Reformed Church. Of the rest of the population, there were 51 members of an Orthodox church (or about 1.92% of the population), and there were 21 individuals (or about 0.79% of the population) who belonged to another Christian church. There were 10 (or about 0.38% of the population) who were Islamic. There was 1 person who was Buddhist and 2 individuals who belonged to another church. 133 (or about 5.01% of the population) belonged to no church, are agnostic or atheist, and 139 individuals (or about 5.23% of the population) did not answer the question.

== Education ==
In Chalais about 923 or (34.7%) of the population have completed non-mandatory upper secondary education, and 254 or (9.6%) have completed additional higher education (either university or a Fachhochschule). Of the 254 who completed tertiary schooling, 61.8% were Swiss men, 28.3% were Swiss women, 5.5% were non-Swiss men and 4.3% were non-Swiss women.

As of 2000, there was one student in Chalais who came from another municipality, while 204 residents attended schools outside the municipality.

Chalais is home to the Bibliothèque communale et scolaire de Chalais et Vercorin library. The library has (as of 2008) 16,102 books or other media, and loaned out 30,421 items in the same year. It was open a total of 191 days with average of 16 hours per week during that year.

== Transportation ==
There is an aerial tramway (gondola lift) connecting the mountain village of Vercorin with Chalais which runs precisely every 15 minutes.
