= Funiculaire St-Luc – Tignousa =

Funicular railway in Anniviers, Valais, Switzerland

Funiculaire St-Luc - Tignousa
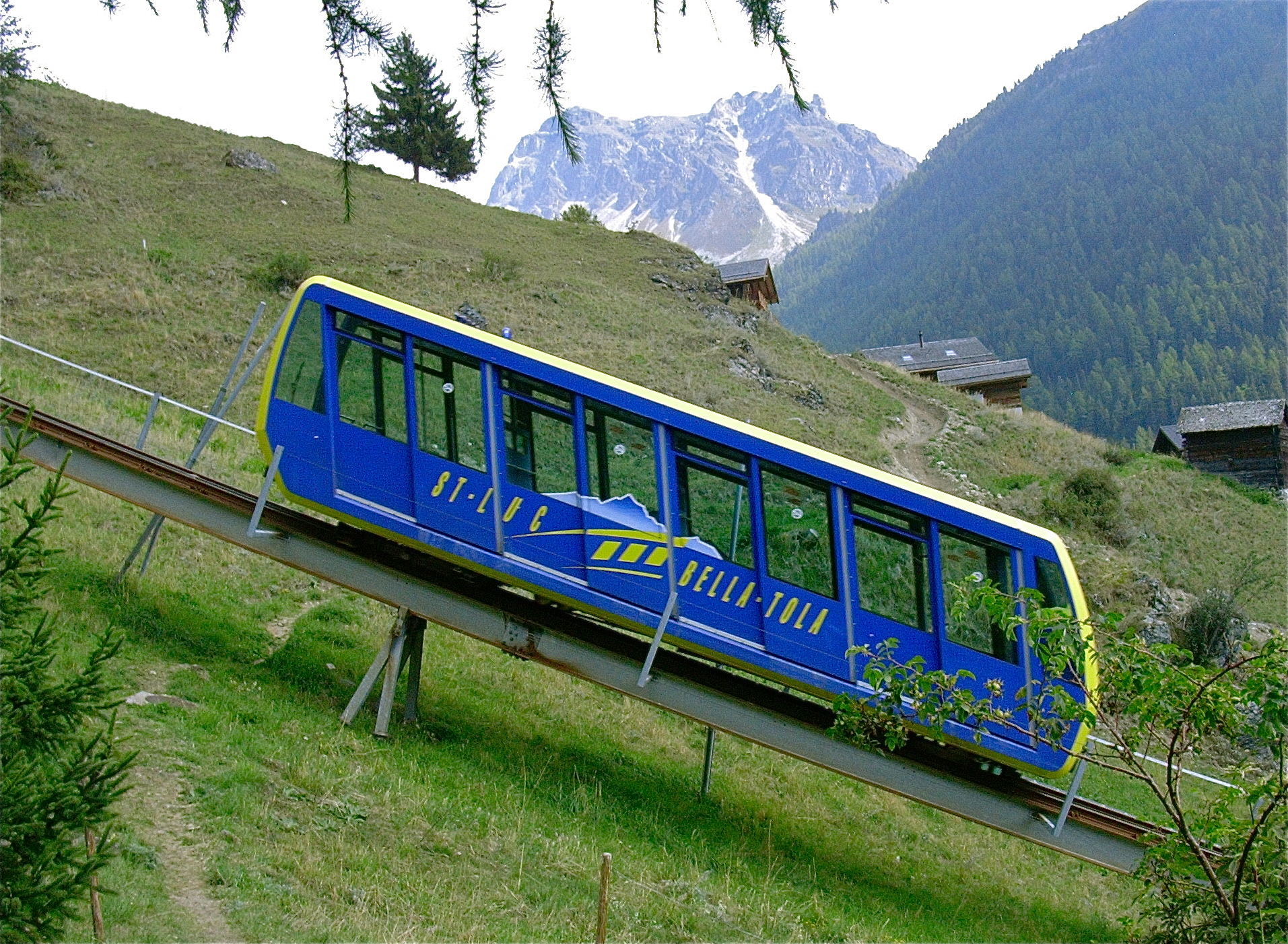
- funicular on the elevated track (2012)

Overview
- Other name(s): Funiculaire de St-Luc
- Status: In operation
- Owner: Funiculaire St-Luc - Chandolin SA (since 1999); Funiculaire St-Luc - Bella-Tola SA (1994–1999, name change)
- Locale: Anniviers; Valais, Switzerland
- Termini: "St-Luc (Tignousa)" at Route du Funiculaire; "Tignousa"
- Stations: 2
- Website: valdanniviers.ch

Service
- Type: Funicular
- Route number: 2201
- Operator(s): Funiculaire St-Luc - Chandolin SA
- Rolling stock: 2 for 80 passengers each
- Ridership: 59,375 (summer 2021); 142,950 (winter 2021/2022)

History
- Opened: 1994

Technical
- Line length: 1,300 m (4,300 ft)
- Number of tracks: 1
- Track gauge: 1,200 mm (3 ft 11 1/4 in)
- Operating speed: 10 metres per second (33 ft/s)
- Highest elevation: 2,180 m (7,150 ft)
- Maximum incline: 61%

Funiculaire de St-Luc - Tignousa is a funicular railway in the Anniviers valley, Valais, Switzerland. The line leads from St-Luc at 1680 m to Tignousa at 2180 m. It provides access to the skiing area St-Luc-Chandolin and also operates in summer season. The line has a length of 1300 m and a difference of elevation of 500 m.

It was built in 1994 replacing an aerial cableway from 1964. An initial concession for 20 years had been granted by the Swiss Federal Assembly in December 1993 with federal councilor Adolf Ogi supporting it before the Council of States.

The funicular is owned and operated by "Funiculaire St-Luc - Chandolin SA" (named Funiculaire St-Luc - Bella-Tola SA 1993–1999 before the merger with Télé Chandolin Anniviers SA Chandolin; earlier Télésiège St-Luc Bella-Tola SA).

Passengers
Year	Summer	Winter	ref
2000/2001	37,407	160,348	
2001/2002	38,291	141,006	
2020/2021	61,598	124,523	
2021/2022	59,375	142,950	
