= Sierre District =

Coordinates: 46°16′13″N 7°30′56″E

Sierre District de Sierre
- District
- Flag Coat of arms
- Country: Switzerland
- Canton: Valais
- Capital: Sierre

Area
  - Total: 397.0 km^{2} (153.3 sq mi)

Population (2020)
  - Total: 49,427
  - Density: 124.5/km^{2} (322.5/sq mi)
- Time zone: UTC+1 (CET)
  - Summer (DST): UTC+2 (CEST)
- Municipalities: 10

The district of Sierre is a district of the canton of Valais in Switzerland. It has a population of 49,427 (as of 31 December 2020).

== Municipalities ==
It comprises the following municipalities:

Municipality	Population (31 December 2020)	Area km^{2}
Anniviers	2,742	242.95
Chalais	3,606	24.46
Chippis	1,597	1.97
Crans-Montana	10,218	59.66
Grône	2,485	21.14
Icogne	633	24.81
Lens	4,317	13.91
Noble-Contrée	4,512	6.51
Sierre	16,819	19.18
Saint-Léonard	2,460	3.9
Total	49,427	418.5

== Coat of arms ==
The blazon of the district coat of arms is Gules, a Sun Or.

== Demographics ==
Sierre has a population (as of December 2020) of 49,427. Most of the population (as of 2000) speaks French (32,090 or 80.2%) as their first language, German is the second most common (3,240 or 8.1%) and Italian is the third (1,522 or 3.8%). There are 15 people who speak Romansh.

As of 2008, the gender distribution of the population was 49.2% male and 50.8% female. The population was made up of 16,070 Swiss men (35.0% of the population) and 6,533 (14.2%) non-Swiss men. There were 17,331 Swiss women (37.8%) and 5,970 (13.0%) non-Swiss women. Of the population in the district 15,421 or about 38.5% were born in Sierre and lived there in 2000. There were 10,133 or 25.3% who were born in the same canton, while 4,100 or 10.2% were born somewhere else in Switzerland, and 9,037 or 22.6% were born outside of Switzerland.

As of 2000, there were 15,872 people who were single and never married in the district. There were 19,763 married individuals, 2,406 widows or widowers and 1,977 individuals who are divorced.

There were 5,349 households that consist of only one person and 968 households with five or more people. Out of a total of 16,811 households that answered this question, 31.8% were households made up of just one person and there were 166 adults who lived with their parents. Of the rest of the households, there are 4,312 married couples without children, 5,215 married couples with children There were 941 single parents with a child or children. There were 225 households that were made up of unrelated people and 603 households that were made up of some sort of institution or another collective housing.

The historical population is given in the following chart:

== Mergers and name changes ==
On 1 January 2009 the municipalities of Val d'Anniviers (Ayer, Chandolin, Grimentz, Saint-Jean, Saint-Luc and Vissoie) merged to form Anniviers.

At the same time Granges (VS) merged into the municipality of Sierre.

On 1 January 2017 the former municipalities of Chermignon, Mollens (VS), Montana and Randogne merged to form the new municipality of Crans-Montana.

On 1 January 2021 the former municipalities of Miège, Venthône and Veyras merged to form the new municipality of Noble-Contrée.

== Politics ==
In the 2007 federal election the most popular party was the CVP which received 37.4% of the vote. The next three most popular parties were the FDP (18.35%), the SP (17.81%) and the SVP (15.85%). In the federal election, a total of 16,632 votes were cast, and the voter turnout was 61.3%.

In the 2009 Conseil d'État/Staatsrat election a total of 15,565 votes were cast, of which 1,099 or about 7.1% were invalid. The voter participation was 57.9%, which is similar to the cantonal average of 54.67%. In the 2007 Swiss Council of States election a total of 16,401 votes were cast, of which 1,251 or about 7.6% were invalid. The voter participation was 61.5%, which is similar to the cantonal average of 59.88%.

== Religion ==
From the 2000 census, 31,439 or 78.6% were Roman Catholic, while 2,146 or 5.4% belonged to the Swiss Reformed Church. Of the rest of the population, there were 1,015 members of an Orthodox church (or about 2.54% of the population), there were 17 individuals (or about 0.04% of the population) who belonged to the Christian Catholic Church, and there were 637 individuals (or about 1.59% of the population) who belonged to another Christian church. There were 62 individuals (or about 0.15% of the population) who were Jewish, and 719 (or about 1.80% of the population) who were Islamic. There were 56 individuals who were Buddhist, 49 individuals who were Hindu and 59 individuals who belonged to another church. 1,945 (or about 4.86% of the population) belonged to no church, are agnostic or atheist, and 2,169 individuals (or about 5.42% of the population) did not answer the question.

== Weather ==
Sierre town has an average of 87.2 days of rain or snow per year and on average receives 657 mm (25.9 in) of precipitation. The wettest month is December during which time Sierre receives an average of 72 mm (2.8 in) of rain or snow. During this month there is precipitation for an average of 7.9 days. The month with the most days of precipitation is August, with an average of 8.4, but with only 58 mm (2.3 in) of rain or snow. The driest month of the year is September with an average of 37 mm (1.5 in) of precipitation over 5.7 days.

== Education ==
In Sierre about 13,162 or (32.9%) of the population have completed non-mandatory upper secondary education, and 4,878 or (12.2%) have completed additional higher education (either University or a Fachhochschule). Of the 4,878 who completed tertiary schooling, 53.6% were Swiss men, 26.8% were Swiss women, 11.3% were non-Swiss men and 8.3% were non-Swiss women.
