= Lac des Autannes =

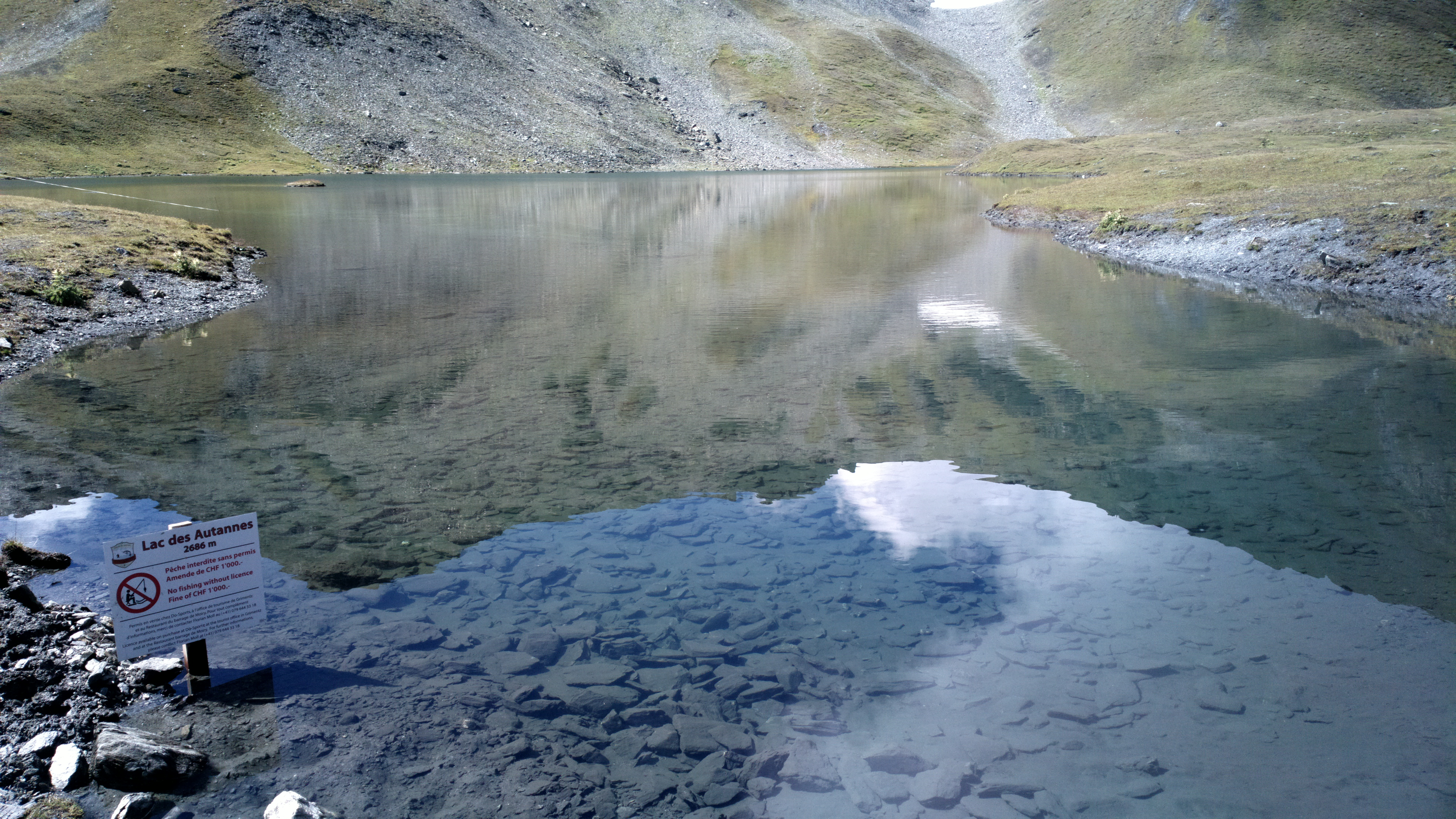

- Location within Canton of Valais Location within Switzerland Location within Alps
- Location: Grimentz, Valais
- Coordinates: 46.1328°N 7.5428°E
- Type: reservoir
- Basin countries: Switzerland
- Surface area: 4.5 ha (11 acres)
- Surface elevation: 2,686 m (8,812 ft)

Location
- Interactive map of Lac des Autannes

Lac des Autannes is a lake above Grimentz in the canton of Valais, Switzerland. The reservoir has a surface area of 4.5 hectares (11 acres). It is located at an elevation of 2,686 metres (8,812 ft).
