= Saint-Jean, Switzerland =

Saint-Jean
- Former municipality
- Flag Coat of arms
- Location of Saint-Jean
- Location within Switzerland Location within Canton of Valais
- Coordinates: 46°12′N 7°35′E
- Country: Switzerland
- Canton: Valais
- District: Sierre

Area
  - Total: 15.5 km^{2} (6.0 sq mi)
- Elevation: 1,327 m (4,354 ft)

Population (December 2008)
  - Total: 237
  - Density: 15.3/km^{2} (39.6/sq mi)
- Time zone: UTC+01:00 (CET)
  - Summer (DST): UTC+02:00 (CEST)
- Postal code: 3961
- SFOS number: 6245
- ISO 3166 code: CH-VS
- Website: www.saint-jean.ch

Saint-Jean (French pronunciation: [sɛ̃ ʒɑ̃]) is a village in the district of Sierre in the Swiss canton of Valais. An independent municipality before, it merged on 1 January 2009 with neighboring Ayer, Chandolin, Grimentz, Saint-Luc and Vissoie to form the municipality of Anniviers.

== History ==
Saint-Jean is first mentioned in 1250 as de Sancto Johanne.

== Coat of arms ==
The blazon of the village coat of arms is Gules, an Ibex rampant Argent on a Chief Or a Royal Orb Sable belted Argent.

== Demographics ==
Saint-Jean has a population (as of December 2008) of 237. Most of the population (as of 2000) speaks French (193 or 98.5%) as their first language, German is the second most common (1 or 0.5%) and Italian is the third (1 or 0.5%).

Of the population in the village, 119 or about 60.7% were born in Saint-Jean and lived there in 2000. There were 47 or 24.0% who were born in the same canton, while 13 or 6.6% were born somewhere else in Switzerland, and 7 or 3.6% were born outside of Switzerland.

As of 2000, there were 76 people who were single and never married in the village. There were 106 married individuals, 11 widows or widowers and 3 individuals who are divorced.

There were 23 households that consist of only one person and 3 households with five or more people. In 2000, a total of 76 apartments (35.8% of the total) were permanently occupied, while 109 apartments (51.4%) were seasonally occupied and 27 apartments (12.7%) were empty.

The historical population is given in the following chart:

Historical population

Year	Pop.	±%
1850	297	—
1860	307	+3.4%
1870	374	+21.8%
1880	364	−2.7%
1888	374	+2.7%
1900	395	+5.6%
1910	418	+5.8%
1920	425	+1.7%

Year	Pop.	±%
1930	341	−19.8%
1941	361	+5.9%
1950	351	−2.8%
1960	253	−27.9%
1970	185	−26.9%
1980	165	−10.8%
1990	183	+10.9%
2000	196	+7.1%

== Politics ==
In the 2007 federal election the most popular party was the CVP which received 56.78% of the vote. The next three most popular parties were the SVP (13.81%), the FDP (12.28%) and the SP (12.15%). In the federal election, a total of 117 votes were cast, and the voter turnout was 57.4%.

== Economy ==
There were 99 residents of the village who were employed in some capacity, of which females made up 41.4% of the workforce. In 2008 the total number of full-time equivalent jobs was 63. The number of jobs in the primary sector was 9, all of which were in agriculture. The number of jobs in the secondary sector was 43 of which 30 or (69.8%) were in manufacturing and 13 (30.2%) were in construction. The number of jobs in the tertiary sector was 11. In the tertiary sector; 1 was in the sale or repair of motor vehicles, 6 or 54.5% were in a hotel or restaurant, .

In 2000, there were 10 workers who commuted into the village and 69 workers who commuted away. The village is a net exporter of workers, with about 6.9 workers leaving the village for every one entering.

== Religion ==
From the 2000 census, 187 or 95.4% were Roman Catholic, while 1 or 0.5% belonged to the Swiss Reformed Church. There was 1 individual who was Islamic. 4 (or about 2.04% of the population) belonged to no church, are agnostic or atheist, and 3 individuals (or about 1.53% of the population) did not answer the question.

== Education ==
In Saint-Jean about 73 or (37.2%) of the population have completed non-mandatory upper secondary education, and 16 or (8.2%) have completed additional higher education (either University or a Fachhochschule). Of the 16 who completed tertiary schooling, 56.3% were Swiss men, 43.8% were Swiss women.

As of 2000, there were 3 students in Saint-Jean who came from another village, while 27 residents attended schools outside the village.
