= Grimentz =

- Former municipality
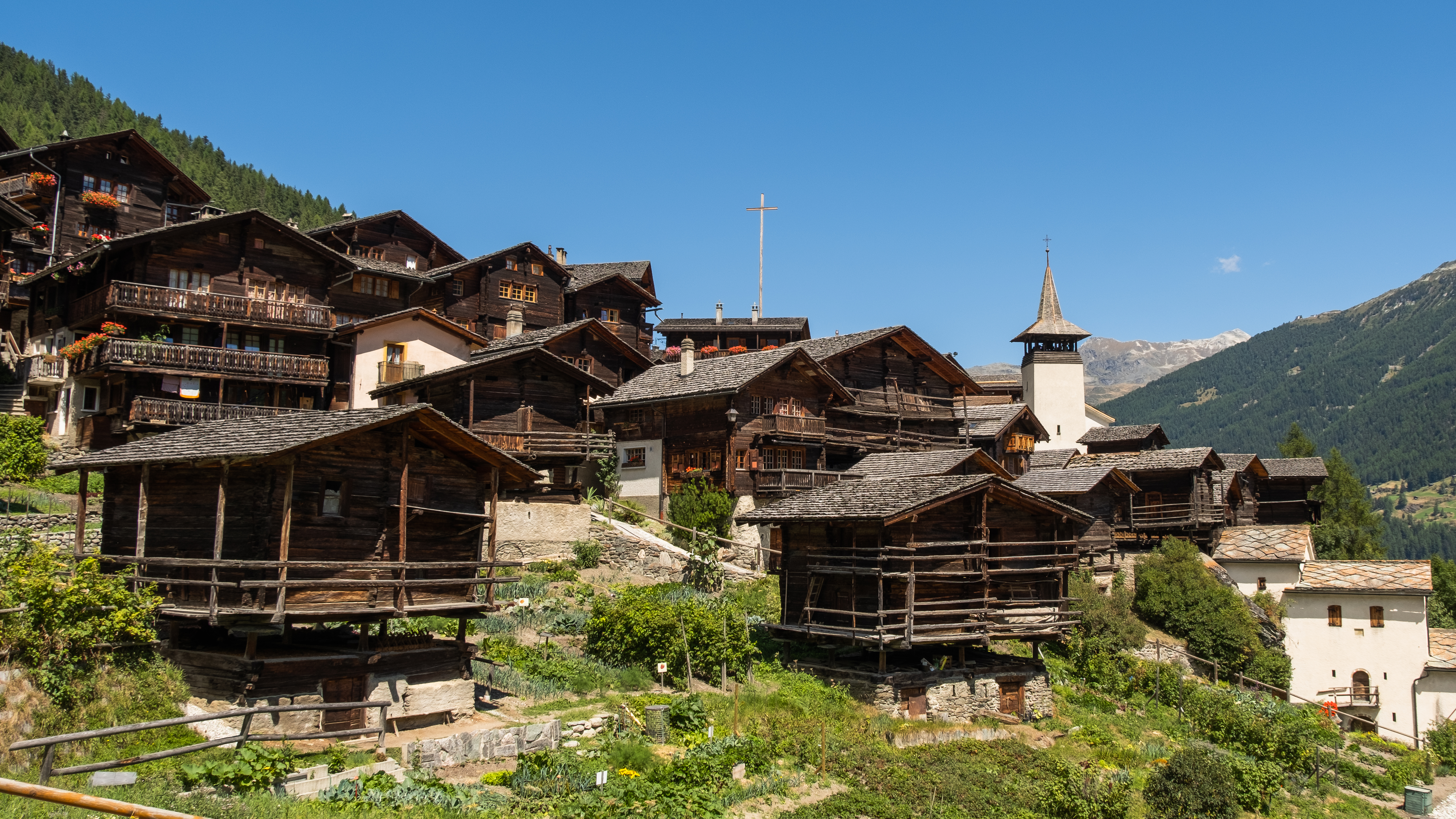

- Flag Coat of arms
- Location of Grimentz
- Location within Switzerland Location within Canton of Valais
- Coordinates: 46°10′51″N 7°34′34″E
- Country: Switzerland
- Canton: Valais
- District: Sierre
- Municipality: Anniviers

Area
  - Total: 58.4 km^{2} (22.5 sq mi)
- Elevation: 1,553 m (5,095 ft)

Population (December 2008)
  - Total: 385
  - Density: 6.59/km^{2} (17.1/sq mi)
- Time zone: UTC+01:00 (CET)
  - Summer (DST): UTC+02:00 (CEST)
- Postal code: 3961
- SFOS number: 6237
- ISO 3166 code: CH-VS
- Website: www.grimentz.ch

Grimentz is a village in the district of Sierre in the Swiss canton of Valais. An independent municipality before, it merged on 1 January 2009 with neighboring Ayer, Chandolin, Saint Jean, Saint-Luc and Vissoie to form the municipality of Anniviers.

== History ==
Grimentz is first mentioned in 1052 as Grimiens. The village was formerly known by its German name Grimensi, however, that name is no longer used.

== Geography ==
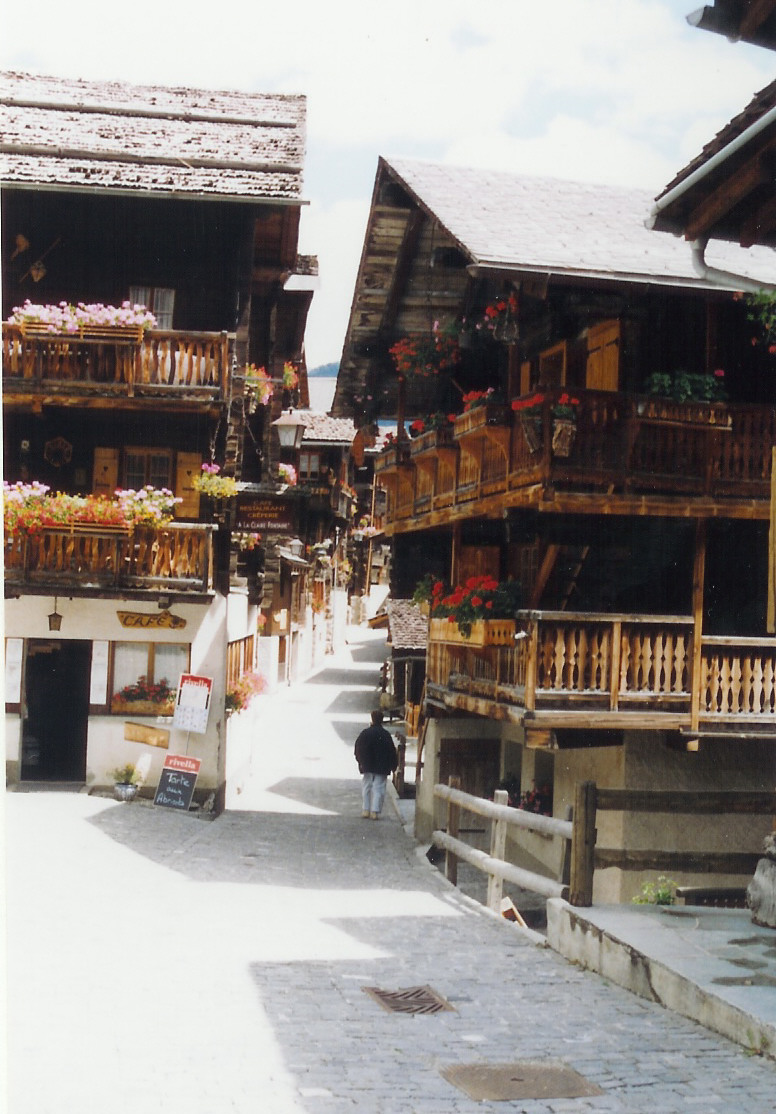
Street in Grimentz.

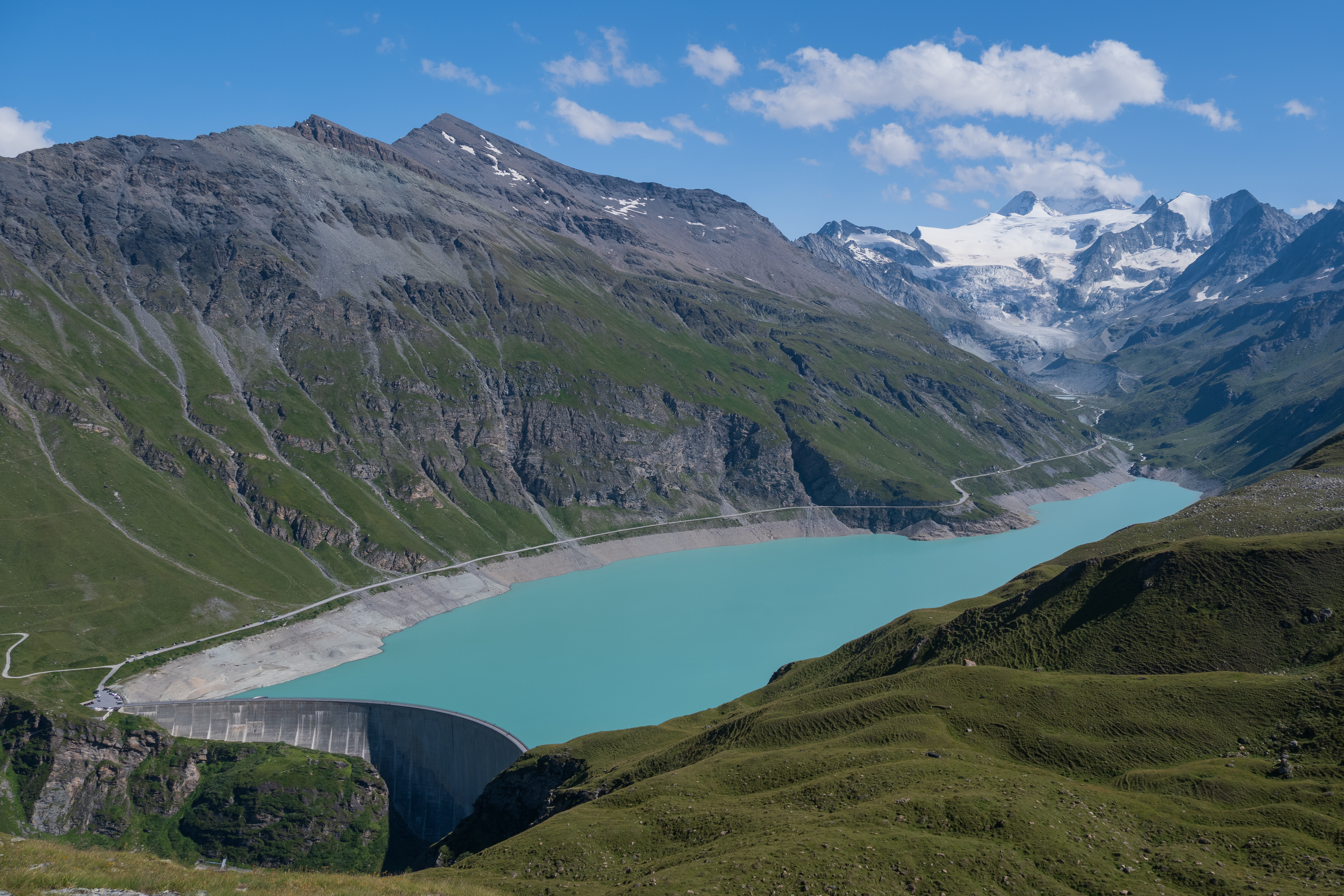
Lac de Moiry

Aerial view (1970)

Lac de Moiry is a reservoir completed 1958. Lac des Autannes is located at an elevation of 2,686 m (8,812 ft). Grimentz lies at 1,620 m (5,310 ft) altitude above sea level.

The village lies in the Val d'Anniviers in the Pennine Alps.

== Coat of arms ==
The blazon of the village coat of arms is Azure between two Mullets of Four Argent a semi-orb sinister of the same and on the chief of the last four Mullets of Five of the first.

== Demographics ==
Grimentz has a population (as of December 2008) of 385. Most of the population (as of 2000) speaks French (373 or 92.3%) as their first language, Portuguese is the second most common (16 or 4.0%) and German is the third (9 or 2.2%). There are 2 people who speak Italian.

Of the population in the village, 229 or about 56.7% were born in Grimentz and lived there in 2000. There were 65 or 16.1% who were born in the same canton, while 52 or 12.9% were born somewhere else in Switzerland, and 58 or 14.4% were born outside of Switzerland.

As of 2000, there were 168 people who were single and never married in the village. There were 213 married individuals, 18 widows or widowers and 5 individuals who are divorced.

There were 49 households that consist of only one person and 14 households with five or more people. In 2000, a total of 159 apartments (15.2% of the total) were permanently occupied, while 856 apartments (81.8%) were seasonally occupied and 32 apartments (3.1%) were empty.

The historical population is given in the following chart:

== Politics ==
In the 2007 federal election the most popular party was the CVP which received 57.69% of the vote. The next three most popular parties were the SVP (13.26%), the SP (11.62%) and the FDP (10.84%). In the federal election, a total of 243 votes were cast, and the voter turnout was 76.2%.

== Economy ==
There were 216 residents of the village who were employed in some capacity, of which females made up 44.0% of the workforce. In 2008 the total number of full-time equivalent jobs was 229. The number of jobs in the primary sector was 10, all of which were in agriculture. The number of jobs in the secondary sector was 63 of which 14 or (22.2%) were in manufacturing and 49 (77.8%) were in construction. The number of jobs in the tertiary sector was 156. In the tertiary sector; 30 or 19.2% were in the sale or repair of motor vehicles, 16 or 10.3% were in the movement and storage of goods, 58 or 37.2% were in a hotel or restaurant, 5 or 3.2% were the insurance or financial industry, 5 or 3.2% were technical professionals or scientists, 1 was in education.

In 2000, there were 49 workers who commuted into the village and 29 workers who commuted away. The village is a net importer of workers, with about 1.7 workers entering the village for every one leaving.

== Religion ==
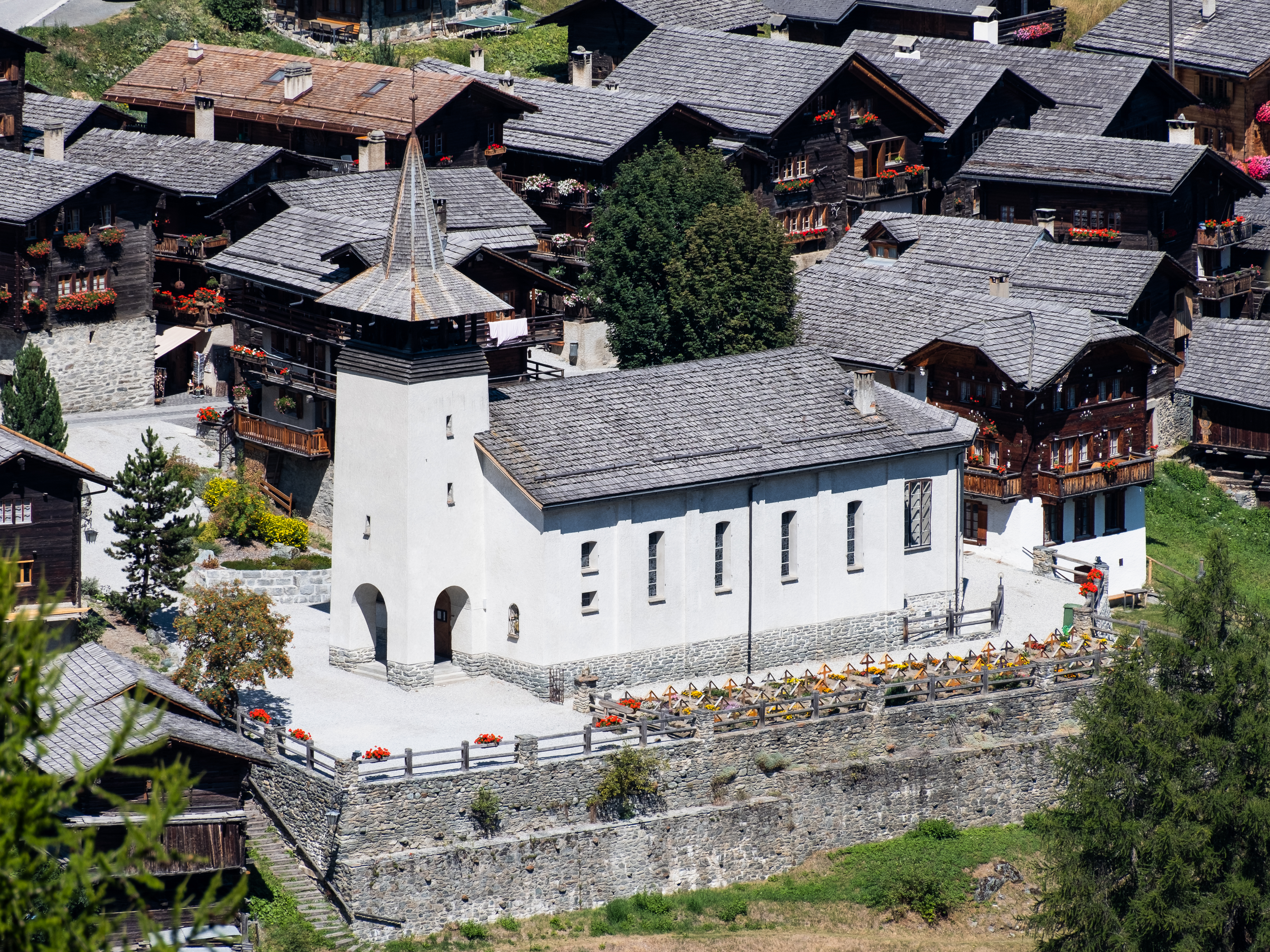
Grimentz village church

From the 2000 census, 372 or 92.1% were Roman Catholic, while 20 or 5.0% belonged to the Swiss Reformed Church. Of the rest of the population, there was 1 member of an Orthodox church, and there was 1 individual who belongs to another Christian church. 9 (or about 2.23% of the population) belonged to no church, are agnostic or atheist, and 1 individual (or about 0.25% of the population) did not answer the question.

== Weather ==
Grimentz has an average of 106.7 days of rain or snow per year and on average receives 769 mm (30.3 in) of precipitation. The wettest month is August during which time Grimentz receives an average of 82 mm (3.2 in) of rain or snow. During this month there is precipitation for an average of 10.9 days. The driest month of the year is April with an average of 52 mm (2.0 in) of precipitation over 8.6 days.

== Education ==
In Grimentz about 166 or (41.1%) of the population have completed non-mandatory upper secondary education, and 29 or (7.2%) have completed additional higher education (either University or a Fachhochschule). Of the 29 who completed tertiary schooling, 48.3% were Swiss men, 41.4% were Swiss women.

As of 2000, there were 2 students in Grimentz who came from another village, while 36 residents attended schools outside the village.
