= Chandolin =

- Former municipality
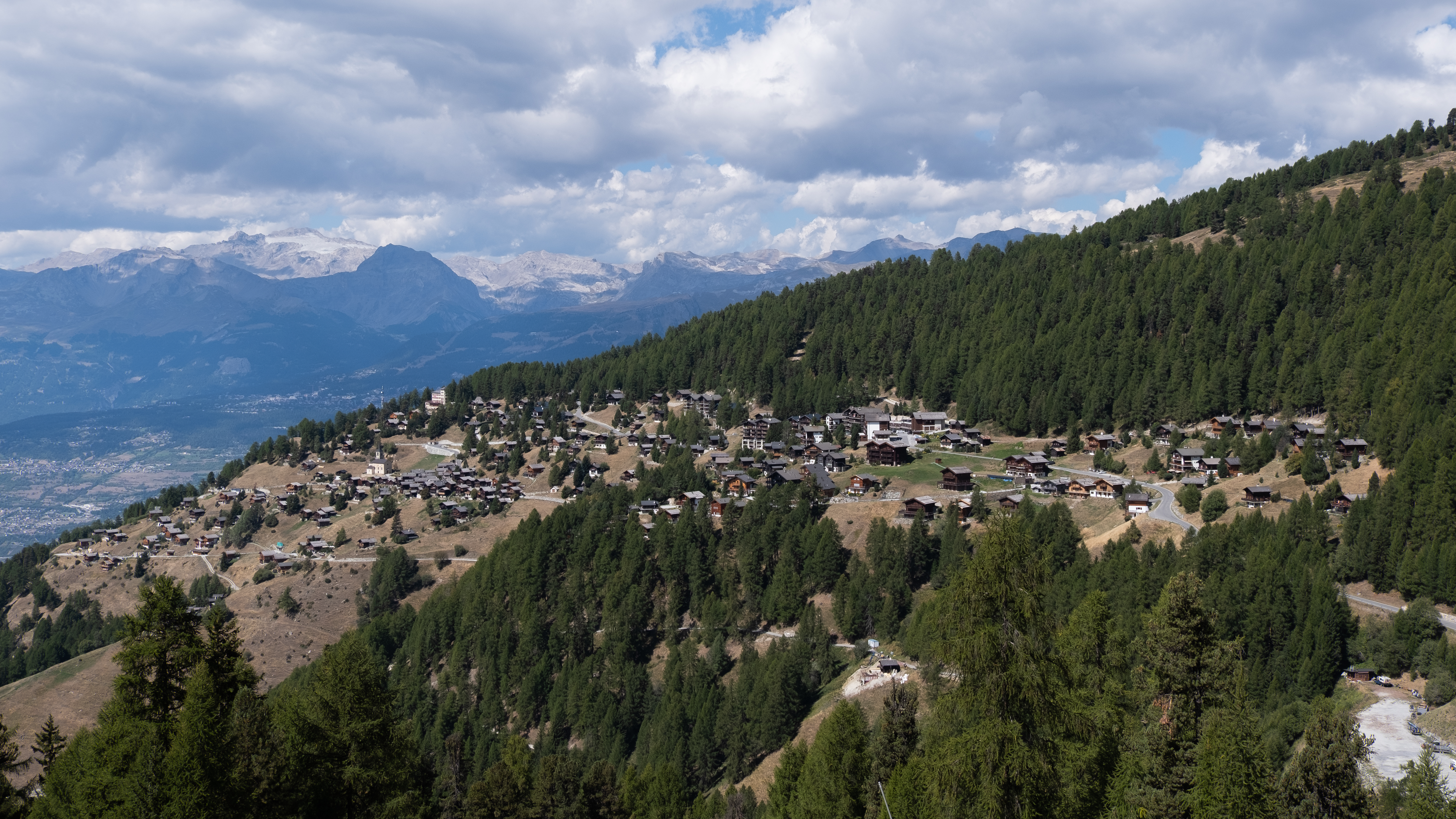

- Flag Coat of arms
- Location of Chandolin
- Location within Switzerland Location within Canton of Valais
- Coordinates: 46°15′N 7°36′E
- Country: Switzerland
- Canton: Valais
- District: Sierre

Area
  - Total: 16.7 km^{2} (6.4 sq mi)
- Elevation: 1,936 m (6,352 ft)

Population (December 2002)
  - Total: 82
  - Density: 4.9/km^{2} (13/sq mi)
- Time zone: UTC+01:00 (CET)
  - Summer (DST): UTC+02:00 (CEST)
- Postal code: 3961
- SFOS number: 6233
- ISO 3166 code: CH-VS
- Website: www.chandolin.ch

Chandolin is a village in the district of Sierre in the Swiss canton of Valais. An independent municipality before, it merged on 1 January 2009 with neighboring Ayer, Grimentz, Saint Jean, Saint-Luc and Vissoie to form the municipality of Anniviers.

== History ==
Chandolin is first mentioned about 1250 as Eschandulyns. Chandolin was the permanent home of Swiss travel writer Ella Maillart until her death, and it now houses the Ella Maillart Museum in her memory.

== Coat of arms ==
The blazon of the village coat of arms is Azure, a Chamois rampant Sable over a rock Argent in chief sinister a Mullet of Five Or.

== Demographics ==
Most of the population (as of 2000) speaks French (81 or 85.3%) as their first language, German is the second most common (8 or 8.4%) and Portuguese is the third (4 or 4.2%).

Of the population in the village, 28 or about 29.5% were born in Chandolin and lived there in 2000. There were 29 or 30.5% who were born in the same canton, while 18 or 18.9% were born somewhere else in Switzerland, and 20 or 21.1% were born outside of Switzerland. As of 2000, there were 32 people who were single and never married in the village. There were 58 married individuals, 1 widows or widowers and 4 individuals who are divorced.

There were 13 households that consist of only one person and 2 households with five or more people. In 2000, a total of 42 apartments (9.6% of the total) were permanently occupied, while 340 apartments (77.4%) were seasonally occupied and 57 apartments (13.0%) were empty.

The historical population is given in the following chart:

== Politics ==
In the 2007 federal election the most popular party was the CVP which received 39.22% of the vote. The next three most popular parties were the SVP (26.05%), the Green Party (10.64%) and the FDP (7.84%). In the federal election, a total of 57 votes were cast, and the voter turnout was 64.8%.

== Economy ==
There were 57 residents of the village who were employed in some capacity, of which females made up 38.6% of the workforce. In 2008 the total number of full-time equivalent jobs was 32. The number of jobs in the primary sector was 2, all of which were in agriculture. The number of jobs in the secondary sector was 4 of which 1 was in manufacturing and 3 were in construction. The number of jobs in the tertiary sector was 26. In the tertiary sector; 5 or 19.2% were in the sale or repair of motor vehicles, 15 or 57.7% were in a hotel or restaurant, .

In 2000, there were 11 workers who commuted into the village and 17 workers who commuted away. The village is a net exporter of workers, with about 1.5 workers leaving the village for every one entering.

== Religion ==
From the 2000 census, 69 or 72.6% were Roman Catholic, while 12 or 12.6% belonged to the Swiss Reformed Church. 10 (or about 10.53% of the population) belonged to no church, are agnostic or atheist, and 4 individuals (or about 4.21% of the population) did not answer the question.

== Education ==
In Chandolin about 31 or (32.6%) of the population have completed non-mandatory upper secondary education, and 21 or (22.1%) have completed additional higher education (either University or a Fachhochschule). Of the 21 who completed tertiary schooling, 66.7% were Swiss men, 9.5% were Swiss women.

As of 2000, there were 13 students from Chandolin who attended schools outside the village.
