= Ayer, Switzerland =

Ayer
- Former municipality
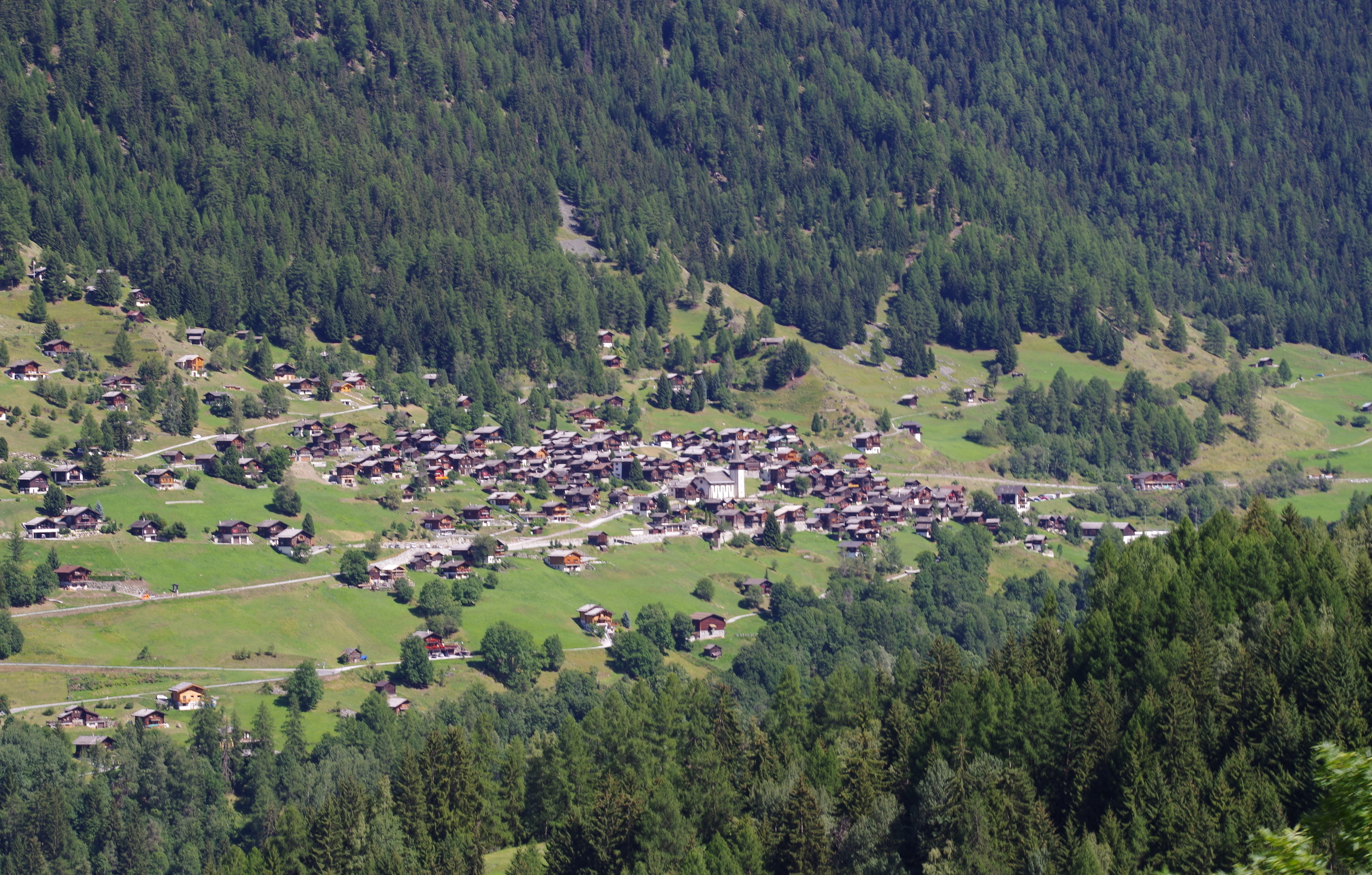

- Flag Coat of arms
- Location of Ayer
- Location within Switzerland Location within Canton of Valais
- Coordinates: 46°11′N 7°36′E
- Country: Switzerland
- Canton: Valais
- District: Sierre

Area
  - Total: 119.1 km^{2} (46.0 sq mi)
- Elevation: 1,476 m (4,843 ft)

Population (December 2002)
  - Total: 668
  - Density: 5.61/km^{2} (14.5/sq mi)
- Time zone: UTC+01:00 (CET)
  - Summer (DST): UTC+02:00 (CEST)
- Postal code: 3961
- SFOS number: 6231
- ISO 3166 code: CH-VS
- Localities: Zinal
- Twin towns: Montferrier-sur-Lez (France)
- Website: www.zinal.ch

Ayer is a village in the district of Sierre in the Swiss canton of Valais. An independent municipality before, it merged on 1 January 2009 with neighboring Chandolin, Grimentz, Saint Jean, Saint-Luc and Vissoie to form the municipality of Anniviers.

== History ==
Ayer is first mentioned in 1296.

Aerial photograph by Werner Friedli from 1970

== Coat of arms ==
The blazon of the village coat of arms is Gules tripant on Coupeaux Vert an Ibex Argent in chief four Mullets of Five of the last in cross.

== Demographics ==
Most of the population (as of 2000) speaks French (513 or 90.0%) as their first language, German is the second most common (27 or 4.7%) and Serbo-Croatian is the third (9 or 1.6%). There are 8 people who speak Italian and 1 person who speaks Romansh.

Of the population in the village, 254 or about 44.6% were born in Ayer and lived there in 2000. There were 106 or 18.6% who were born in the same canton, while 92 or 16.1% were born somewhere else in Switzerland, and 95 or 16.7% were born outside of Switzerland. As of 2000, there were 209 people who were single and never married in the village. There were 295 married individuals, 28 widows or widowers and 38 individuals who are divorced.

There were 76 households that consist of only one person and 11 households with five or more people. In 2000, a total of 229 apartments (19.5% of the total) were permanently occupied, while 871 apartments (74.0%) were seasonally occupied and 77 apartments (6.5%) were empty.

The historical population is given in the following chart:

== Politics ==
In the 2007 federal election the most popular party was the CVP which received 51.77% of the vote. The next three most popular parties were the SP (22.92%), the FDP (9.37%) and the SVP (7.81%). In the federal election, a total of 333 votes were cast, and the voter turnout was 63.7%.

== Economy ==
There were 312 residents of the village who were employed in some capacity, of which women made up 42.9% of the workforce.

In 2008 the total number of full-time equivalent jobs was 254. The number of jobs in the primary sector was 13, all of which were in agriculture. There were 116 jobs in the secondary sector, of which 16 or (13.8%) were in manufacturing and 76 (65.5%) were in construction. There were 125 jobs in the tertiary sector: 16 or 12.8% were in the sale or repair of motor vehicles, 26 or 20.8% were in the movement and storage of goods, 59 or 47.2% were in a hotel or restaurant, and 6 or 4.8% were technical professionals or scientists.

In 2000, there were 52 workers who commuted into the village and 104 workers who commuted away. The village is a net exporter of workers, with about 2.0 workers leaving the village for every one entering.

== Religion ==
From the 2000 census, 444 or 77.9% were Roman Catholic, while 38 or 6.7% belonged to the Swiss Reformed Church. Of the rest of the population, there were 8 members of an Orthodox church (or about 1.40% of the population), and there were 8 individuals (or about 1.40% of the population) who belonged to another Christian church. There were 14 (or about 2.46% of the population) who were Muslim. 38 (or about 6.67% of the population) belonged to no church, are agnostic or atheist, and 24 individuals (or about 4.21% of the population) did not answer the question.

== Education ==
In Ayer about 215 (or 37.7%) of the population have completed non-mandatory upper secondary education, and 57 (or 10.0%) have completed additional higher education (either University or a Fachhochschule). Of the 57 who completed tertiary schooling, 56.1% were Swiss men, 31.6% were Swiss women.

As of 2000, there were 61 students from Ayer who attended schools outside the village.
