= Vissoie =

- Former municipality
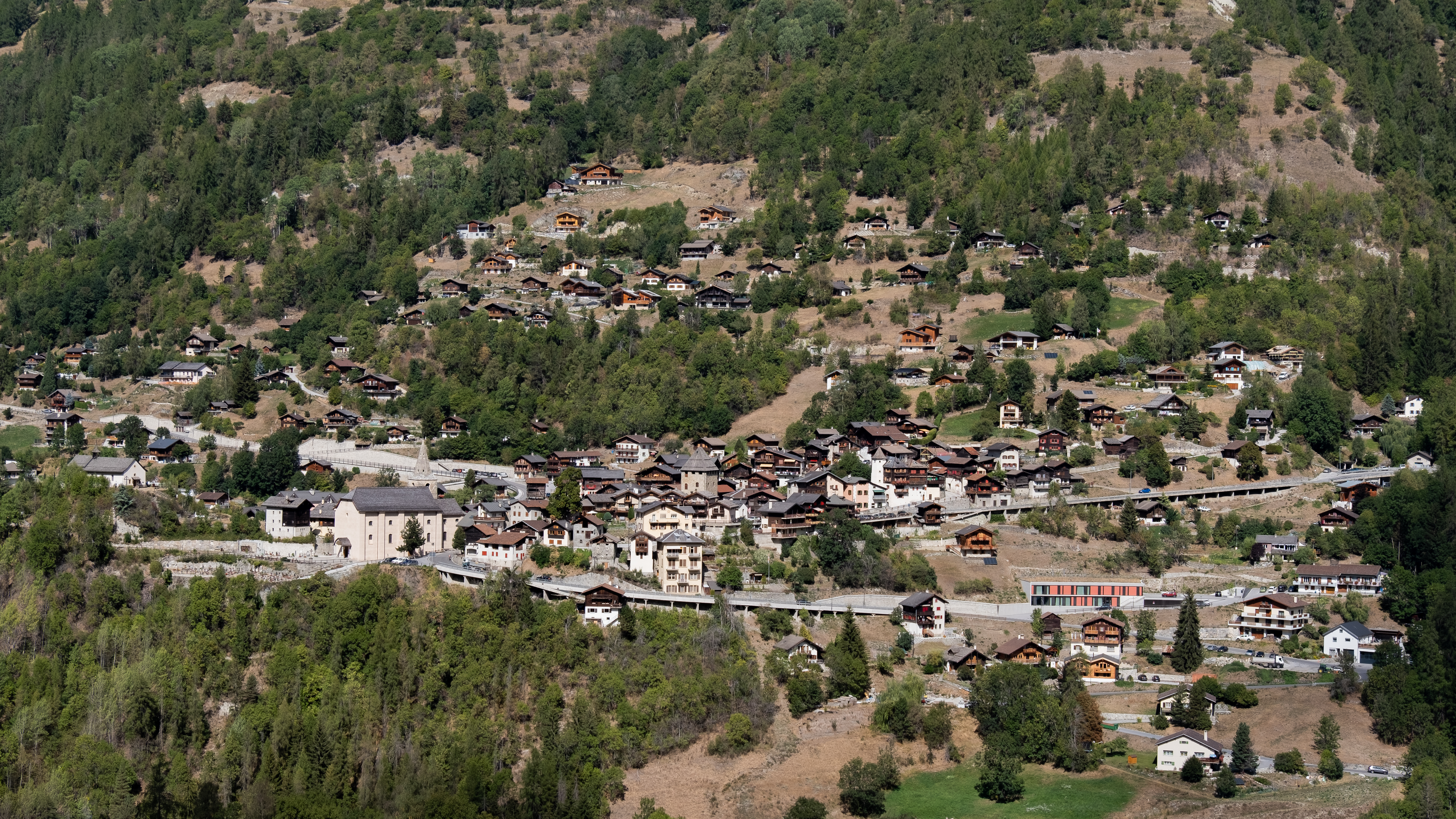

- Flag Coat of arms
- Location of Vissoie
- Location within Switzerland Location within Canton of Valais
- Coordinates: 46°13′N 7°35′E
- Country: Switzerland
- Canton: Valais
- District: Sierre

Area
  - Total: 1.5 km^{2} (0.58 sq mi)
- Elevation: 1,202 m (3,944 ft)

Population (December 2008)
  - Total: 375
  - Density: 250/km^{2} (650/sq mi)
- Time zone: UTC+01:00 (CET)
  - Summer (DST): UTC+02:00 (CEST)
- Postal code: 3961
- SFOS number: 6251
- ISO 3166 code: CH-VS
- Website: www.vissoie.ch

Vissoie is a village in the district of Sierre in the Swiss canton of Valais.

The village became an independent municipality in 1905 when it split from the municipalities of Ayer and Grimentz. However, on 1 January 2009 it merged with neighboring Ayer, Chandolin, Grimentz, Saint Jean and Saint-Luc to form the municipality of Anniviers.

== Geography ==
Aerial view (1970)

Vissoie has an area, as of 2011, of 1.5 square kilometers (0.58 mi^{2}).

In 1905 the village expanded with the détachée des communes d'Ayer and de Grimentz. In 2009 Vissoie merged with Ayer, Chandolin, Grimentz, Saint-Jean and Saint-Luc into the municipality of Anniviers.

== Coat of arms ==
The blazon of the village coat of arms is Gules, an Ibex rampant Argent.

== Demographics ==
Vissoie has a population (as of December 2008) of 375.

Most of the population (as of 2000) speaks French (399 or 88.5%) as their first language, Portuguese is the second most common (30 or 6.7%) and German is the third (12 or 2.7%). There are 6 people who speak Italian.

Of the population in the village, 219 or about 48.6% were born in Vissoie and lived there in 2000. There were 103 or 22.8% who were born in the same canton, while 35 or 7.8% were born somewhere else in Switzerland, and 88 or 19.5% were born outside of Switzerland.

As of 2000, there were 181 people who were single and never married in the village. There were 241 married individuals, 21 widows or widowers and 8 individuals who are divorced.

There were 41 households that consist of only one person and 11 households with five or more people. In 2000, a total of 161 apartments (66.8% of the total) were permanently occupied, while 62 apartments (25.7%) were seasonally occupied and 18 apartments (7.5%) were empty.

The historical population is given in the following chart:

== Twin Town ==
Vissoie is twinned with the town of Montferrier-sur-Lez, France.

== Politics ==
In the 2007 federal election the most popular party was the CVP which received 49.34% of the vote. The next three most popular parties were the FDP (20.2%), the SP (11.84%) and the SP (11.84%). In the federal election, a total of 222 votes were cast, and the voter turnout was 70.7%.

== Economy ==
There were 224 residents of the village who were employed in some capacity, of which females made up 39.3% of the workforce. In 2008 the total number of full-time equivalent jobs was 205. The number of jobs in the primary sector was 2, all of which were in agriculture. The number of jobs in the secondary sector was 101 of which 22 or (21.8%) were in manufacturing and 80 (79.2%) were in construction. The number of jobs in the tertiary sector was 102. In the tertiary sector; 24 or 23.5% were in the sale or repair of motor vehicles, 9 or 8.8% were in the movement and storage of goods, 15 or 14.7% were in a hotel or restaurant, 1 was in the information industry, 4 or 3.9% were the insurance or financial industry, 6 or 5.9% were technical professionals or scientists, 30 or 29.4% were in education and 4 or 3.9% were in health care.

In 2000, there were 105 workers who commuted into the village and 93 workers who commuted away. The village is a net importer of workers, with about 1.1 workers entering the village for every one leaving.

== Religion ==
From the 2000 census, 399 or 88.5% were Roman Catholic, while 17 or 3.8% belonged to the Swiss Reformed Church. There were 2 (or about 0.44% of the population) who were Islamic. There was 1 person who was Hindu. 15 (or about 3.33% of the population) belonged to no church, are agnostic or atheist, and 17 individuals (or about 3.77% of the population) did not answer the question.

== Education ==
In Vissoie about 168 or (37.3%) of the population have completed non-mandatory upper secondary education, and 39 or (8.6%) have completed additional higher education (either University or a Fachhochschule). Of the 39 who completed tertiary schooling, 59.0% were Swiss men, 30.8% were Swiss women.

As of 2000, there were 165 students in Vissoie who came from another village, while 19 residents attended schools outside the village.

Vissoie is home to the Bibliothèque d'Anniviers library. The library has (as of 2008) 7,002 books or other media, and loaned out 5,395 items in the same year. It was open a total of 167 days with average of 25 hours per week during that year.
