= Saint-Luc, Switzerland =

Saint-Luc
- Former municipality
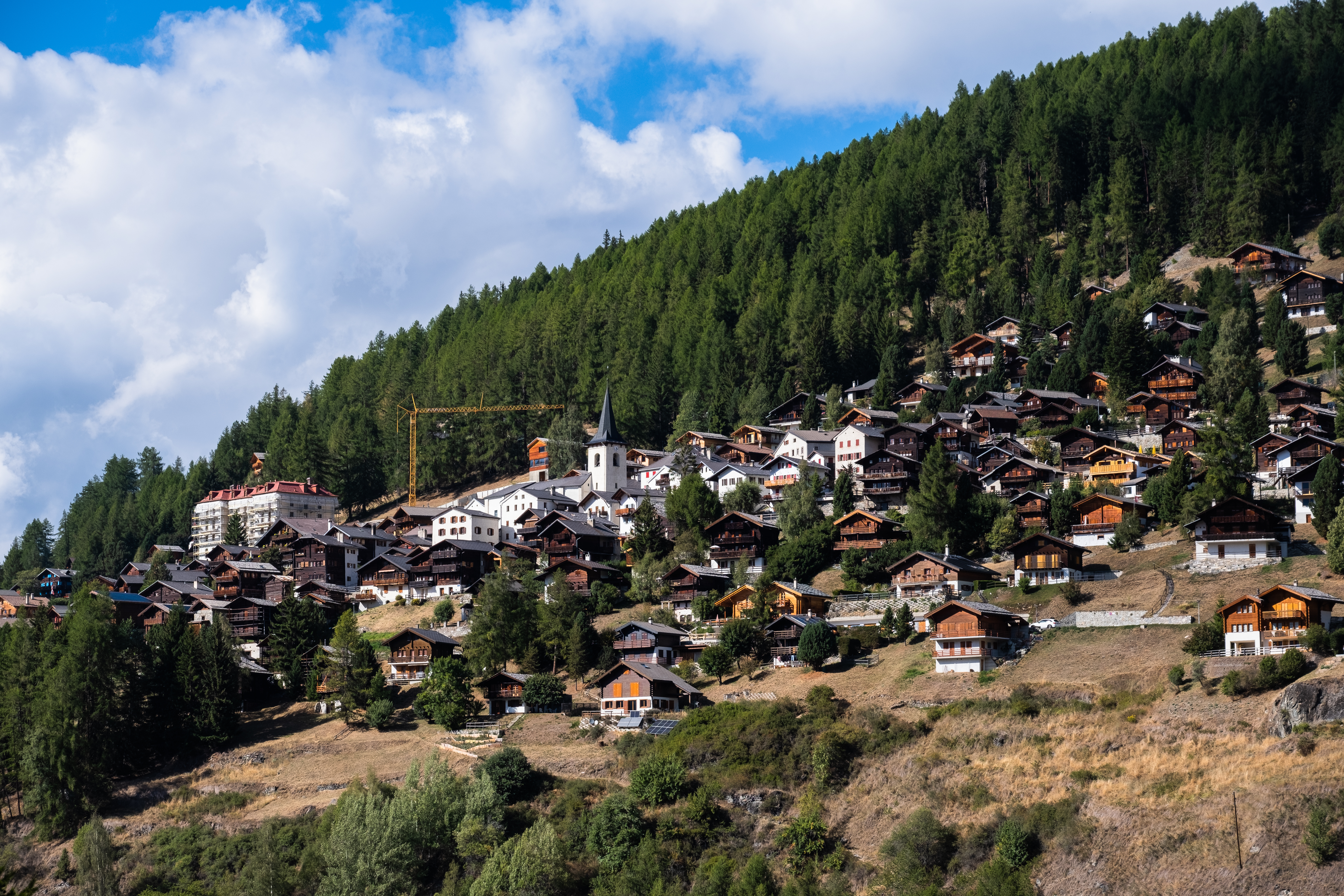
- General view of Saint-Luc

- Flag Coat of arms
- Location of Saint-Luc
- Location within Switzerland Location within Canton of Valais
- Coordinates: 46°13′N 7°36′E
- Country: Switzerland
- Canton: Valais
- District: Sierre

Area
  - Total: 31.9 km^{2} (12.3 sq mi)
- Elevation: 1,655 m (5,430 ft)

Population (December 2008)
  - Total: 312
  - Density: 9.78/km^{2} (25.3/sq mi)
- Time zone: UTC+01:00 (CET)
  - Summer (DST): UTC+02:00 (CEST)
- Postal code: 3961
- SFOS number: 6247
- ISO 3166 code: CH-VS
- Website: www.saint-luc.ch

Saint-Luc (French pronunciation: [sɛ̃ lyk]) is a village in the district of Sierre in the Swiss canton of Valais. An independent municipality before, it merged on 1 January 2009 with neighboring Ayer, Chandolin, Grimentz, Saint Jean and Vissoie to form the municipality of Anniviers.

== History ==
Aerial view (1970)

Saint-Luc is first mentioned in 1267 as Lus. In 1304 it was mentioned as Luc, which was the official name until 1904. The name Saint-Luc first appears around 1850. In 1858, the village was gutted by fire, which lead to a crucial redevelopment in the structures of the chalets. In 1891, the Hotel Weisshorn was built high above the village to cater to walkers, it is still used by ski tourers today.

== Coat of arms ==
The blazon of the village coat of arms is Azure, issuant from a Ribbon Or three Pine trees Vert trunked proper and an Ox passant Argent.

== Demographics ==
Saint-Luc has a population (as of December 2015) of 340.

Most of the population (as of 2000) speaks French (265 or 83.1%) as their first language, German is the second most common (22 or 6.9%) and Portuguese is the third (16 or 5.0%). There are 8 people who speak Italian.

Of the population in the village, 110 or about 34.5% were born in Saint-Luc and lived there in 2000. There were 87 or 27.3% who were born in the same canton, while 53 or 16.6% were born somewhere else in Switzerland, and 66 or 20.7% were born outside of Switzerland.

As of 2000, there were 135 people who were single and never married in the village. There were 154 married individuals, 16 widows or widowers and 14 individuals who are divorced.

There were 32 households that consist of only one person and 11 households with five or more people. In 2000, a total of 120 apartments (11.8% of the total) were permanently occupied, while 845 apartments (82.8%) were seasonally occupied and 55 apartments (5.4%) were empty.

The historical population is given in the following chart:

== Politics ==
In the 2007 federal election the most popular party was the CVP which received 36.88% of the vote. The next three most popular parties were the SP (22.57%), the SVP (12.86%) and the Green Party (9.97%). In the federal election, a total of 176 votes were cast, and the voter turnout was 63.8%.

== Economy ==
There were 165 residents of the village who were employed in some capacity, of which females made up 42.4% of the workforce. In 2008 the total number of full-time equivalent jobs was 167. The number of jobs in the primary sector was 14, of which 3 were in agriculture and 11 were in forestry or lumber production. The number of jobs in the secondary sector was 14 of which 13 or (92.9%) were in manufacturing and 1 was in construction. The number of jobs in the tertiary sector was 139. In the tertiary sector; 14 or 10.1% were in the sale or repair of motor vehicles, 17 or 12.2% were in the movement and storage of goods, 67 or 48.2% were in a hotel or restaurant, 6 or 4.3% were in education.

In 2000, there were 37 workers who commuted into the village and 72 workers who commuted away. The village is a net exporter of workers, with about 1.9 workers leaving the village for every one entering.

== Religion ==
From the 2000 census, 269 or 84.3% were Roman Catholic, while 25 or 7.8% belonged to the Swiss Reformed Church. Of the rest of the population, there was 1 individual who belongs to another Christian church. 21 (or about 6.58% of the population) belonged to no church, are agnostic or atheist, and 3 individuals (or about 0.94% of the population) did not answer the question.

== Education ==
In Saint-Luc about 120 or (37.6%) of the population have completed non-mandatory upper secondary education, and 47 or (14.7%) have completed additional higher education (either University or a Fachhochschule). Of the 47 who completed tertiary schooling, 48.9% were Swiss men, 31.9% were Swiss women, 14.9% were non-Swiss men.

As of 2000, there were 67 students from Saint-Luc who attended schools outside the village.

== Ski Resort ==
Saint-Luc has a ski resort above, at a mean elevation of 2,200 metres. Connected with Chandolin's ski resort, it forms the Saint-Luc - Chandolin Ski Domain, with 12 ski installations (8 skilifts, 3 chairlifts, and 1 funicular), as well as 65 kilometres of ski runs. The main points of "rendez-vous" of the station are situated either at Tignousa, at an elevation of 2,180 metres, or at the Tsapé, in Chandolin side, at an elevation of 2,475 metres. The lowest and highest points of the station are at 1,680 and 2,965 metres respectively, both located on the slopes of Saint-Luc.

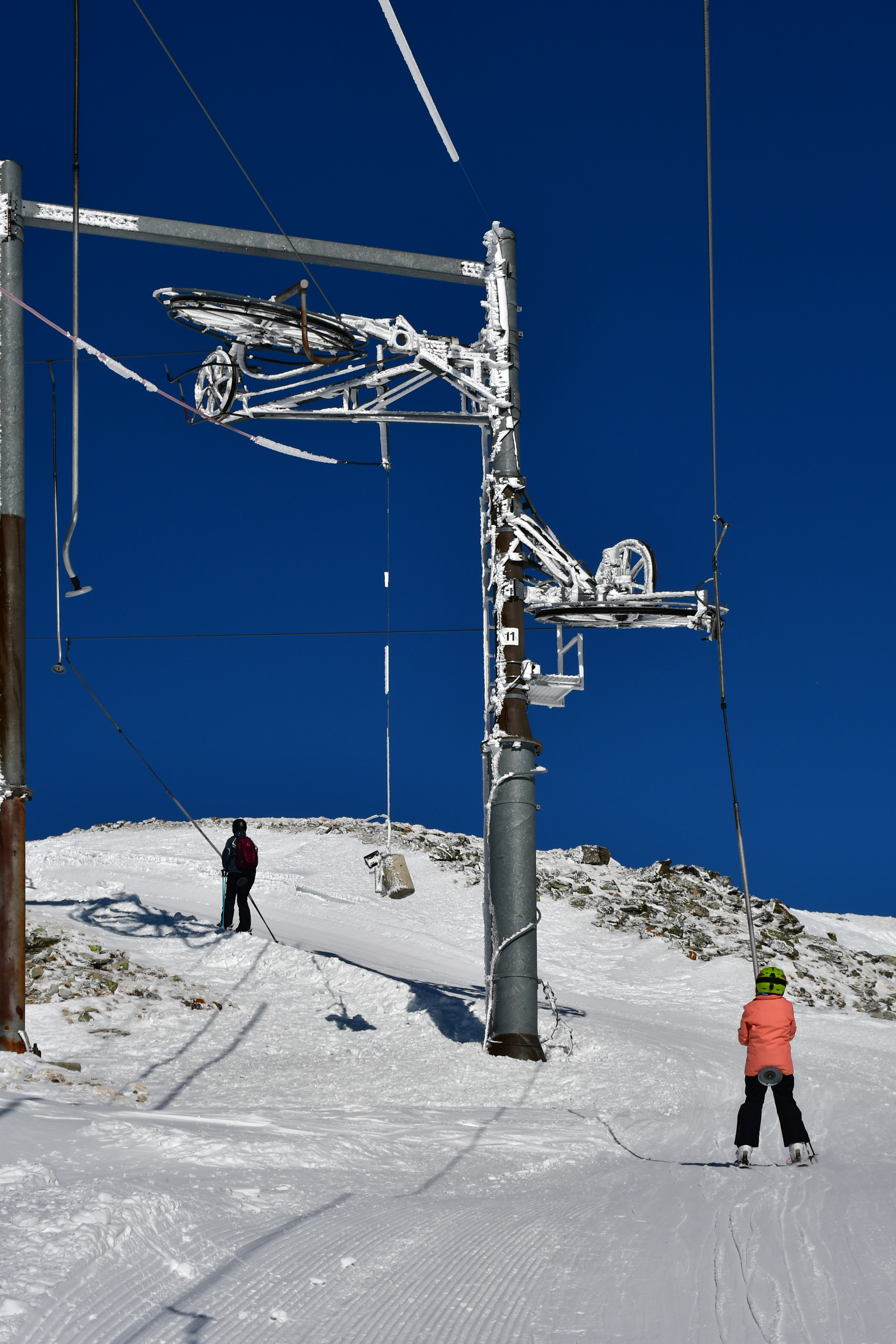
The Bella-Tola skilift permits skiers to access one of the highest and most beautiful panoramic views of the domain.

=== History ===
The resort started in 1959, with the ski lift Combettaz., which was subsequently replaced with a chairlift in 1964, constructed by GMD Müller. On the same occasion, it built the main lift of the station, Tignousa. Preceding these constructions, Chandolin had already built a Poma skilift in 1961, named Illhorn, which brought skiers from the village to the summit of the peak of the same name. In 1965, Müller built the Par-di-Modzes skilift, situated left of the Combettaz. Designated for young skiers, the skilift would be shut down in 2018. The following year, Poma built the Foret skilift, located left of the Par-di-Modzes skilift. Named after the forest it travelled through, the skilift suffered many renovations and enlargements before being replaced with a Poma chairlift in 2015. Two years later, the final Müller lift in Saint-Luc, the Col des Ombrintzes, was put into service. No further constructions or renovations were effectuated until 1971, when Chandolin ordered Willy Bühler company to construct the Tsape chairlift (also known as La Remointse) and the Etables skilift. In 1973, to open access to the Bella-Tola sector, the ski lift Pas de Boeuf was put into action. With a route of over 2 kilometres long, it became the longest Poma installation in Switzerland. Apart from the renovations on the Foret skilift, Saint Luc - Chandolin waited for eight years before ordering the construction of their next installation in 1981, with the Cret de la Motte poma lift. Not a very interesting lift for skiers, it was put out of service and abandoned in 2012. The subsequent year, the Bela-Tolla skilift authorizes the access to the peak of the same name, which becomes the highest point of the resort. Although the peak's elevation is 3,025 metres, the skilift is only capable to arrive 60 metres lower. In 1985, the Ecole (literal translation of School in French) lift is put into action for young skiers of the Ecole Suisse de Ski de Saint-Luc, and Saint Luc - Chandolin starts exploring a connection project between their two domains. In 1986, the Rotsé chairlift, built by Müller, permits for the first time skiers from Chandolin to access Saint-Luc by ski. To grant the return of Chandolin skiers onto Chandolin, the Col des Ombrintzes skilift is lengthened by Poma. Seven years later, in 1993, the Illhorn skilift is renovated and cut into two separate segments, as the previous lift was very difficult and especially long. The Illhorn I lift is a simply shortened version of the old lift, while Illhorn II is built from completely new materials by Poma. The following year, the Combettaz chairlift is replaced by Funiculaire St-Luc – Tignousa, a funicular built by Garaventa, which was supposed to promote "durable installations". At the same time, Poma builds a skilift, similar to the Ecole, in Chandolin, and is named Tsa. After that, no more installations were built, excluding the replacement of the Foret lift in 2015 and the shortening of the Rotse in 2020.

== In popular culture ==
In the 1970s, an action television series called Skiboy was filmed in Saint-Luc, where actors Stephen R. Hudis, Margot Alexis, Robert Coleby, and Frederick Jaeger starred in the show. The show is about a young skier who solves crimes and mysteries in his village innocently.
