= Anniviers =

- Municipality
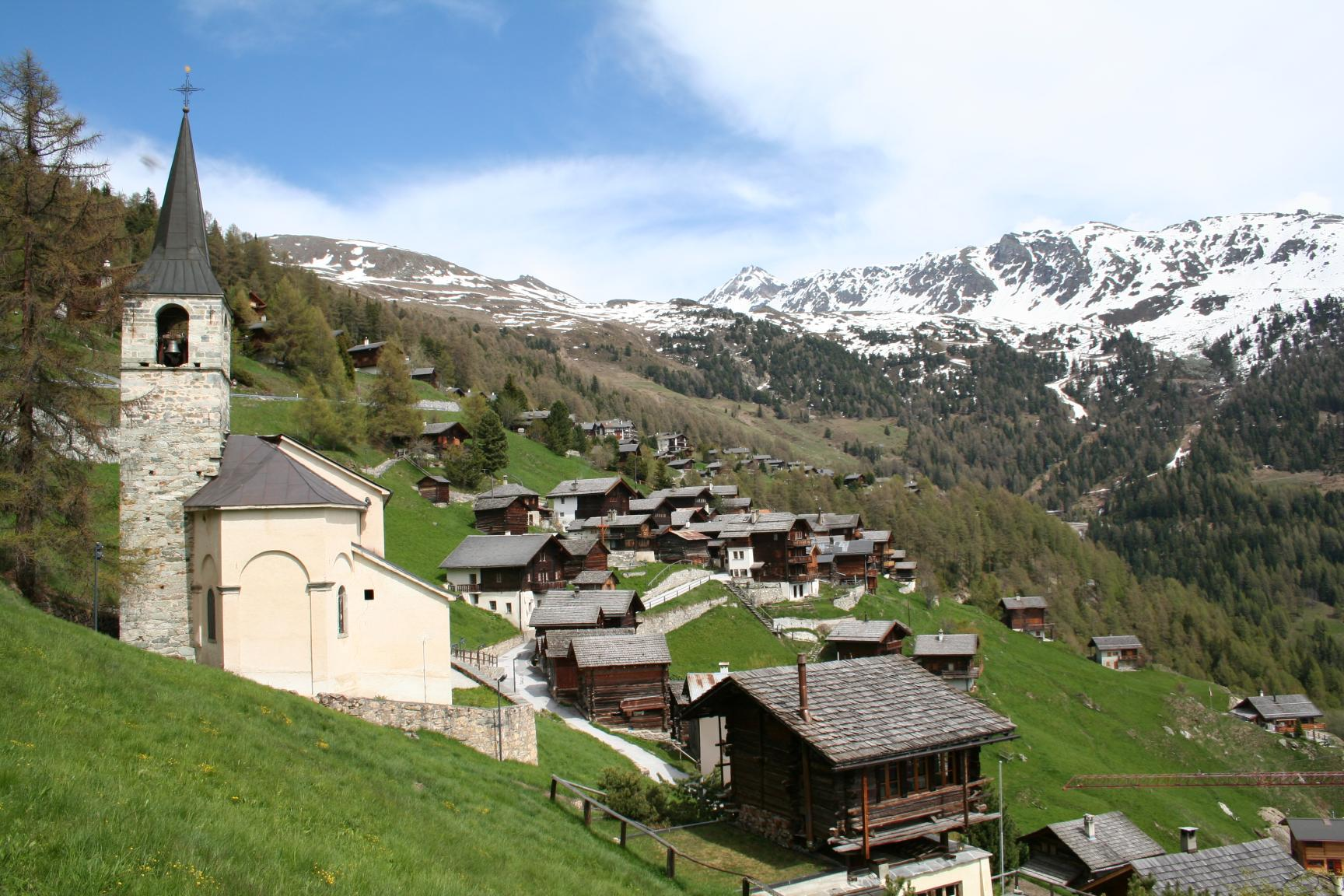
- Village of Chandolin in the municipality of Anniviers

- Flag Coat of arms
- Location of Anniviers
- Location within Switzerland Location within Canton of Valais
- Coordinates: 46°12′N 7°35′E
- Country: Switzerland
- Canton: Valais
- District: Sierre

Government
  - Mayor: Simon Epiney

Area
  - Total: 243.15 km^{2} (93.88 sq mi)
- Elevation: 1,202 m (3,944 ft)

Population (January 2009)
  - Total: 2,371
  - Density: 9.751/km^{2} (25.26/sq mi)
- Time zone: UTC+01:00 (CET)
  - Summer (DST): UTC+02:00 (CEST)
- Postal code: 3961
- SFOS number: 6252
- ISO 3166 code: CH-VS
- Localities: Ayer, Chandolin, Grimentz, Saint-Jean, Saint-Luc, Vissoie, Mayoux, Mission, Zinal, Niouc, Fang
- Surrounded by: Agarn, Chippis, Oberems, Sierre,
- Website: www.anniviers.org

Anniviers is a municipality in the district of Sierre in the canton of Valais in Switzerland. It was formed through the merger of six municipalities in Val d'Anniviers: Ayer, Chandolin, Grimentz, Saint-Jean, Saint-Luc and Vissoie. The merger became effective 1 January 2009, creating the third largest municipality of Switzerland by area.

== History ==
Human settlement dates from the Bronze Age and Iron Age. The region was later occupied by Gaulish tribes, who were conquered by the Roman Empire during the first century. Under Rome the valley was incorporated into the province of Helvetia and became known as Annivesium.

The present inhabitants of Anniviers are claimed to be descendants of Huns or a related people, who migrated to Europe from Central Asia, during or after the fall of the Western Roman Empire. An extinct and unrecorded language formerly spoken in the area is reported to have had similarities to Hungarian. The inhabitants of Val d'Anniviers generally became Christian much later than their neighbours; the Swiss travel writer Marc-Théodore Bourrit, in Description des Alpes Pennines et Rhetiennes (1781) writes of how the Bishopric of Sion struggled to convert the people of the valley, who long adhered to a pagan religion. A century later, the Hungarian cleric and historian Mihály Horváth says of the inhabitants: "They say they are the descendants of the old Huns. The majority of them have light-blue eyes or grayish green eyes, blonde or brown hair, with large and bony forehead and a slight yoke-bone. They have a common nose, broad chin, prominent shoulders and neck, and they are in general low-statured." Other cultural features including folk art, cuisine and burial rituals are also said to support this link. There are two main theories regarding the inhabitants' connection to the Huns:

- the inhabitants are descended from followers of Attila who settled in the valley after being defeated in the Battle of the Catalaunian Plains (451 CE) and/or;
- they are descended from Magyars (Hungarians) who invaded western Europe during the 10th century.

The valley was known as Annivesium until 1052. The Bishop of Sion owned the valley between 1116 and 1138 and donated it to the chapter. In the year 1193, the area became a demesne of the Anniviers family, then by Raron (1381). The property was returned to the bishopric in 1798.

Ayer was first mentioned in 1296, and Chandolin about 1250 as Eschandulyns. Grimentz was first mentioned in 1052 as Grimiens; the village was formerly known by its German name Grimensi. Saint-Jean was first mentioned in 1250 as de Sancto Johanne. Saint-Luc was first mentioned in 1267 as Lus and in 1304 as Luc; the name Saint-Luc first appeared around 1850, and was nout the official name until 1904.

While the valley's first cart path was cleared in about 1300, a wagon road was not built until 1854 for the transport of nickel and cobalt ores. The paved road dates from 1955; it was constructed to allow transportation of materials needed to build the Dam Moiry.

The number of parishes increased from two in 1805 to five in 1932. By 1905 there were six municipalities: Ayer, Chandolin, Saint-Luc, Saint-Jean, Grimentz and Vissoie.

== Geography ==
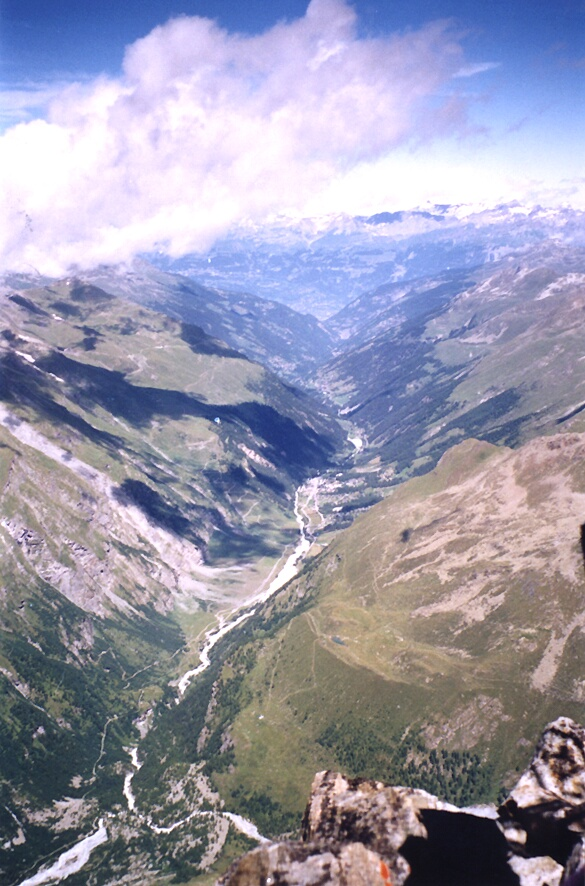
Val-Anniviers

Anniviers has an area, as of 2011, of 243.1 square kilometers (93.9 mi^{2}). Of this area, 22.0% is used for agricultural purposes, while 19.4% is forested. Of the rest of the land, 1.5% is settled (buildings or roads) and 57.1% is unproductive land.

== Demographics ==
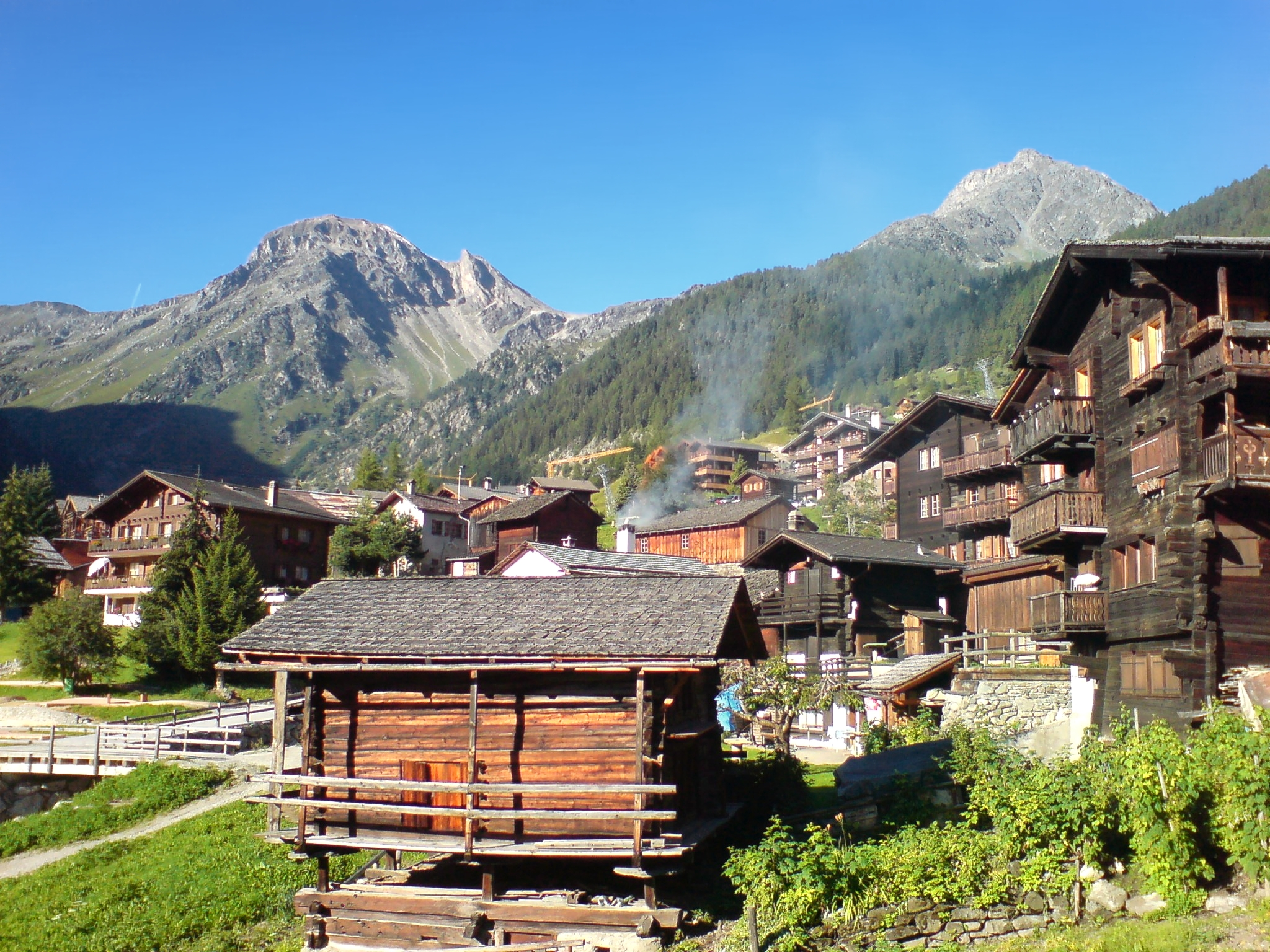
Village of Grimentz

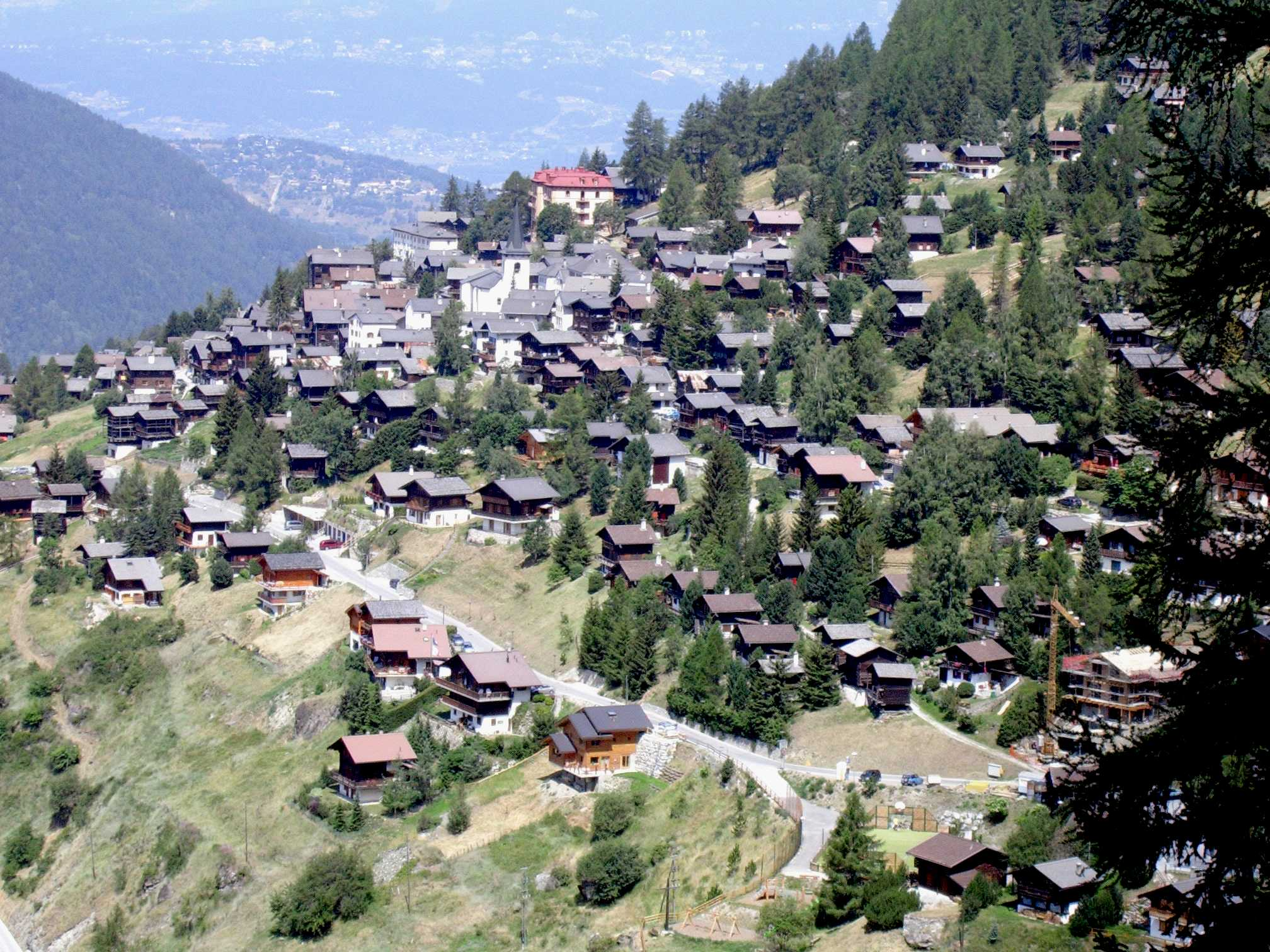
Village of St. Luc

Anniviers has a population (as of December 2020) of 2,742. As of 2008, 19.5% of the population are resident foreign nationals. Over the last 10 years (2000–2010 ) the population has changed at a rate of 14.4%. It has changed at a rate of 14.8% due to migration and at a rate of 3.4% due to births and deaths.

Most of the population (as of 2000) speaks French (89.6%) as their first language, German is the second most common (3.9%) and Portuguese is the third (3.4%).

As of 2008, the population was 52.1% male and 47.9% female. The population was made up of 1,038 Swiss men (41.0% of the population) and 281 (11.1%) non-Swiss men. There were 1,000 Swiss women (39.5%) and 213 (8.4%) non-Swiss women.

As of 2000, children and teenagers (0–19 years old) make up 25% of the population, while adults (20–64 years old) make up 60% and seniors (over 64 years old) make up 15.1%.

As of 2009, the construction rate of new housing units was 17 new units per 1000 residents. The vacancy rate for the municipality, in 2010, was 0.52%.

== Historic Population ==
The historical population is given in the following chart:

== Heritage sites of national significance ==
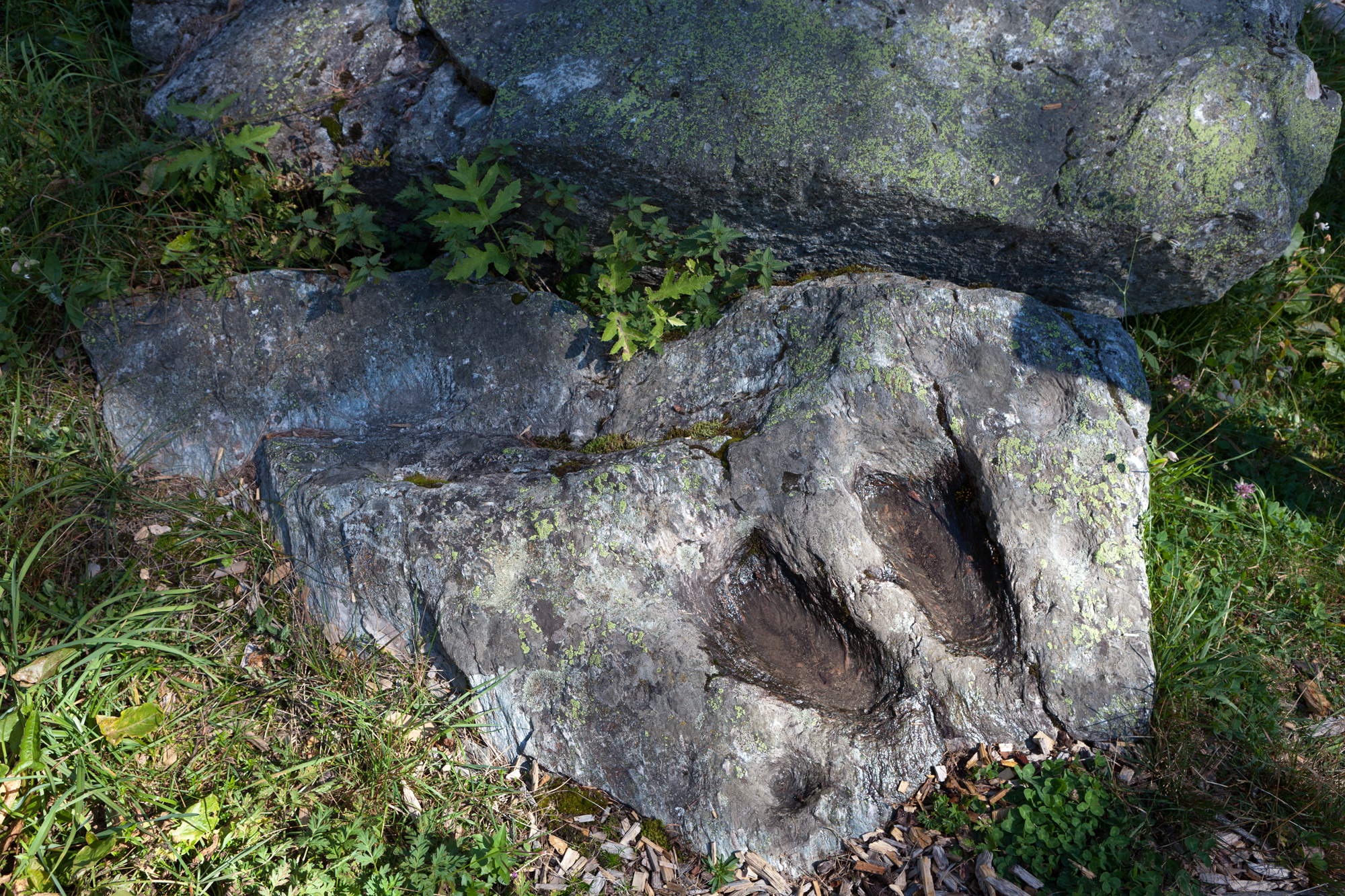
Grinding stones at Ilôt Bosquet and Chlasche

The Ilôt Bosquet and Chlasche in Grimentz is listed as a Swiss heritage site of national significance. The villages of Ayer, Grimentz, Saint-Jean, and Vissoie along with the hamlet of Pinsec are all part of the Inventory of Swiss Heritage Sites.

== Politics ==
In the October 12, 2008, municipal election, the Christian Democratic People's Party of Switzerland took six seats, the Free Democratic Party of Switzerland took two seats, and the AdG took one seat.

== Economy ==
As of 2010, Anniviers had an unemployment rate of 3.5%. As of 2008, there were 106 people employed in the primary economic sector and about 55 businesses involved in this sector. 358 people were employed in the secondary sector and there were 43 businesses in this sector. 669 people were employed in the tertiary sector, with 142 businesses in this sector. Of the working population, 7.5% used public transportation to get to work, and 53.1% used a private car.

== Weather ==
The village of Grimentz has an average of 106.7 days of rain or snow per year and on average receives 769 mm (30.3 in) of precipitation. The wettest month is August during which time Grimentz receives an average of 82 mm (3.2 in) of rain or snow. During this month there is precipitation for an average of 10.9 days. The driest month of the year is April, with an average of 52 mm (2.0 in) of precipitation over 8.6 days.

== Education ==
The village of Vissoie is home to the Bibliothèque d'Anniviers library. The library has (as of 2008) 7,002 books or other media, and loaned out 5,395 items in the same year. It was open a total of 167 days with average of 25 hours per week during that year.

== Tourism ==
Anniviers is a high tourism region. Several hiking trails and diverse sports installations welcome visitors in summer. In winter, three ski areas are available: Grimentz, Saint-Luc - Chandolin and Zinal. Vercorin is also nearby, but is technically not in the municipality.

== Special events ==
Every year, Anniviers is the terminus of the Sierre-Zinal and the Grand Raid Cristalp races.

== Regional Specialty ==
A speciality wine of the valley is the Vin du Glacier.

== Access ==
- A9: Motorway of Lausanne-Simplon.
- Exit Sierre. 20 km (12 mi) via a picturesque mountain road.
