= Tonkin Railway =

Rail transport connecting crossing Switzerland and France

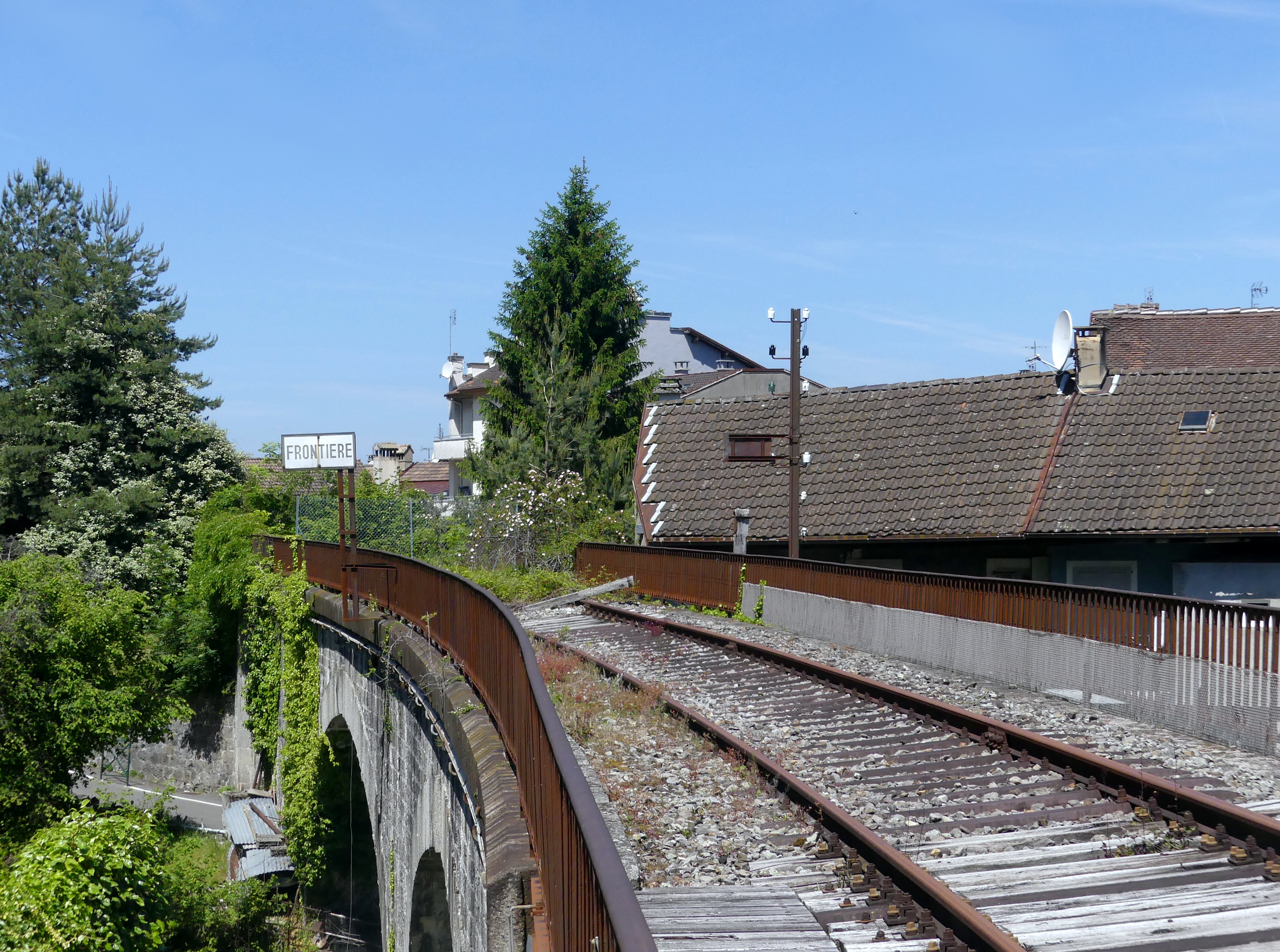
- Viaduct de la Morge at Saint-Gingolph in 2019.

Overview
- Owner: SBB (in Switzerland); SNCF (in France)
- Locale: Switzerland, France

Service
- Services: In Switzerland: Voyageurs RegionAlps (since 2003), SBB local freight; In France: Voyageurs PLM (until 1938), Fret local (until 1988), Touristique (until 1998)

History
- Opened: 1859 – 1886
- Closed: 1998 (partial closure)

Technical
- Track gauge: Standard-gauge railway (1,435 m)
- Electrification: 15 kV - 16.7 Hz in Switzerland, 25 kV - 50 Hz in France (not electrified between Évian and St-Gingolph)
- Signalling: Absolute block signalling

The Tonkin Railway, or South Lake Geneva railway, is a partly disused line connecting the Swiss cities of Saint-Maurice and Geneva via the French communes of Évian-les-Bains, Thonon-les-Bains and Annemasse, crossing the France–Switzerland border twice.

As of 2024, the railway line is operational in the Chablais region between Évian-les-Bains and Geneva and in the canton of Valais between St-Maurice and St-Gingolph (Saint-Gingolph–Saint-Maurice railway). However, the 17.8 km (11.1 mi) long section between Saint-Gingolph and Évian-les-Bains, along the southeastern shore of Lake Geneva (Lac Léman), has been out of service since 1998. Several associations are currently campaigning for its reopening.

== History ==
On 7 September 1852, Vaudois investors requested a concession from the Valais Council of States for a Villeneuve - Aosta railway. The concession was refused, and the Valais government requested the study of a Bouveret - Sion railway, which would be authorised on 11 January 1858.

The first train made the journey from Bouveret to Vouvry on 16 February 1859, and would open as far as Monthey station on 27 March. The Bouveret–Saint-Maurice railway would commence operations on 14 July 1859 without fanfare, operated by the Compagnie de la Ligne d'Italie. The line would be extended to Sion in 1860.

In 1874, the Compagnie de la Ligne d'Italie went bankrupt, and the Simplon Company took over the operation of the railway. The line would be extended to Saint-Gingolph in 1878. The Chemins de fer de Paris à Lyon et à la Méditerranée (PLM) opened the railway between Collonges and Thonon-les-Bains via Annemasse on 30 August 1880.

In 1881, the Simplon Company merged with the Western Switzerland Company to form the Western Switzerland–Simplon Railways (SOS), which now operated the Swiss part of the railway. The PLM would extend their line in sections to eventually connect to the SOS railhead at Saint-Gingolph in 1886.

Following another merger in 1889, the Jura-Simplon Railways (JS) operated the Swiss part of the railway. The railway came under the control of the Swiss Federal Railways (SBB) on 1 May 1903.

In 1938, passenger traffic was suspended on the French part of the railway and diverted to the road. During World War II, with the defeat of France, all railway customs were under the control of the occupying power except for those on the Tonkin Railway, which remained the only Franco-Swiss border crossing point. Bouveret station then had a traffic of 300 freight wagons per day. Special trains were operated by the Red Cross following the war to transport former prisoners, but also food. Many of these trains ran regularly from Saint-Maurice to Avignon and Sète via the Tonkin Railway. They passed through Le Bouveret, Saint-Gingolph, Évian-les-Bains, Annemasse, Annecy, Chambéry, Montmélian, Grenoble, and Valence. Swiss SBB class C 5/6 steam locomotives leased from the SNCF hauled these trains.

On 1 October 1954, electric services commenced on the Swiss section between Saint-Gingolph and Monthey. In the winter of 1972/1973, a traffic of 1,000 tons of imports and 19,000 tons of exports was recorded towards Évian-les-Bains and Le Bouveret, according to sources from the SNCF and Customs in Chambéry.

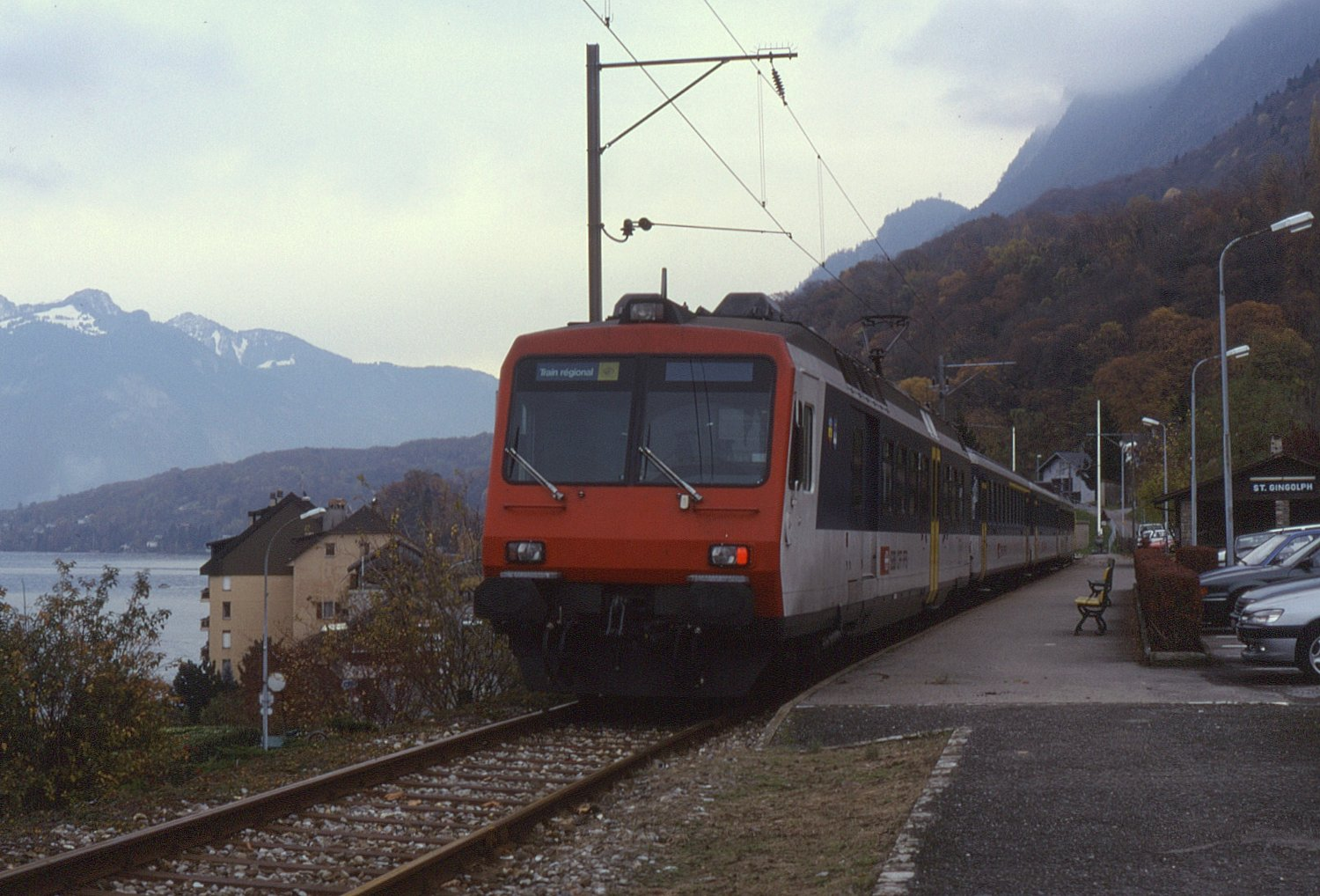
An SBB RBDe 500 near St. Gingolph, 1998.

In 1988, the SNCF discontinued the freight traffic in the French part. From 1986 to 1998, the tourist train Rive-Bleue Express ran between Le Bouveret and Évian, maintaining the French part of the railway. The section between Saint-Gingolph and Évian closed in 1998. In 2003, the operation of the Swiss railway was taken over by the newly created company RegionAlps. From 20 November 2006 to 2010, the closed section of the railway was cleaned in preparation for a possible reopening.

=== Name ===
It is said that the nickname "Tonkin Railway" was given to this railway by its builders, who found geological conditions during construction reminiscent of those encountered during the construction of the "real" Tonkin Railway, between southern China and northern Indochina, then a French colony.

== Project to reopen the Évian − St-Gingolph section ==
=== Preludes ===
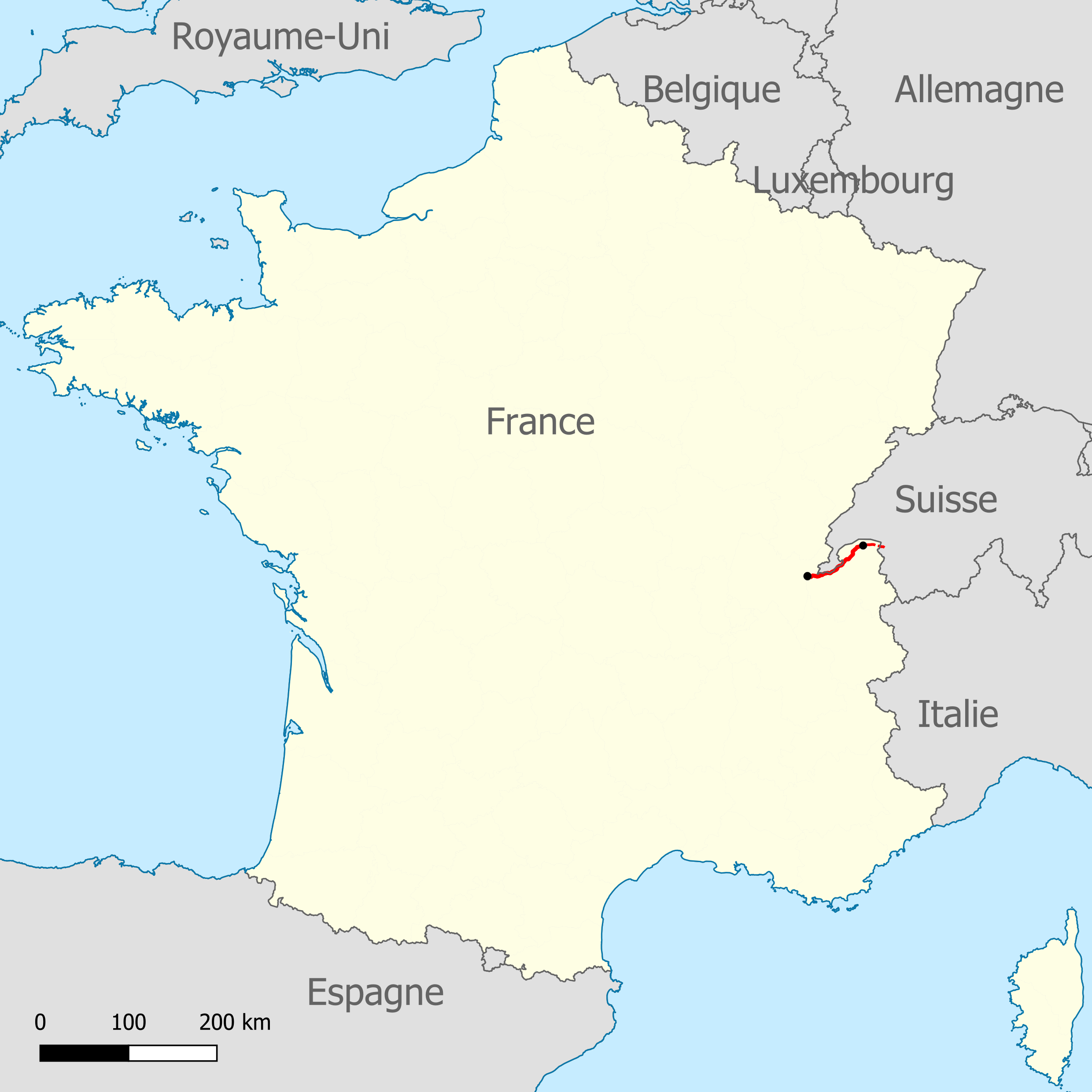
Tonkin Railway on the far right, the black bridges are Bellegarde on the left and Evian on the right.

After the sale of the rolling stock of the tourist train "Rive-Bleue Express", the local French authorities initially preferred to convert the railway into a bikeway rather than work towards its reopening. However, this idea was quickly abandoned, mainly due to international conventions preventing the downgrading of the railway and its cost (100,000 euros per kilometer).

Other ideas were then put forward, such as converting the railway into a voie verte and building a road with viaducts and tunnels above the villages on the southern shore of Lake Geneva, which would divert international road traffic. However, these proposals did not meet with the approval of the local and national authorities, while the reopening of the railway, which also had its supporters, came back to the fore.

Regarding this, according to opponents of the railway rehabilitation project, the preliminary study for the reopening of the railway costs 2 million dollars, a sum higher than the construction of a 17-kilometer voie verte at 100,000 euros per kilometer. However, it is officially known that the preliminary study represents a real cost of 115,100 euros.

The dossier was then taken over by the Rhône-Alpes region, which organizes rail transport, in partnership with the Swiss cantons of Geneva and Valais, which voted in February 2006 to grant a credit of 400,000 Swiss francs to clear and weed the abandoned French section up to and including 2010, pending a decision. Cleaning of the railway began on 20 November 2006.

=== Initiation of the reopening process ===
On 16 December 2008 the Regional Council of Rhône-Alpes unanimously adopted a resolution incorporating the reopening into the Regional Scheme for Transport Services, which reads as follows:

The Regional Council of Rhône-Alpes reaffirms the objectives and orientations of the Regional Transport Plan (RTP) regarding the railway known as the "Tonkin Railway" linking Evian and Saint-Gingolph. It calls for the pre-project studies to be launched immediately and reaffirms its desire for a project compatible with Swiss technology (power supply, signaling, and techniques identical to those of the Pontarlier-Les Verrières railway) and the constraints of the areas crossed (urban, semi-urban, rural). It hopes that this project will be developed in close collaboration with elected officials, the populations concerned, and the associative world. Finally, it hopes that the French State and the RFF will quickly commit to providing their share of the funding for this project.

On 16 March 2009 the President of the Rhône-Alpes Regional Council, Jean-Jack Queyranne, announced that a preliminary study would soon be launched. This study would allow the railway to be reopened to tourists in 2011, and to regional passengers in 2013 or 2015. However, in June 2015, no trains were running on the abandoned section.

On 22 April 2009 the specifications for the preliminary study were presented in Saint-Gingolph, financed by the Rhône-Alpes Region and the Chablais Inter-Municipal Development Syndicate, made up of 62 French Chablais municipalities, and by the Chablais Inter-Cantonal Development Organization, made up of the cantons of Vaud and Valais, for Switzerland.

The results of this preliminary study were presented in Evian-les-Bains on 18 July 2011. The cost of the rehabilitation of the railway is 106 million euros (124 million euros with margins and contingencies). The chosen scenario is the extension of the Valais railway to Évian-les-Bains. The railway would therefore be electrified with Swiss electricity and operated by the company RegionAlps (a subsidiary of Swiss Federal Railways). Funding is currently being sought and the partners are awaiting the next planning contract between the French state and the Rhône-Alpes region.

On 22 September 2012 the Franco-Swiss association "Save the Tonkin" made a symbolic gesture: A model of the Domino train crossed the level crossing in the commune of Meillerie, halfway between the stations of Evian-les-Bains and Saint-Gingolph.

On 20 February 2020, about three months after the full opening of the Léman Express network, a steering committee composed of Swiss and French representatives met to revive the missing 17 km (11 mi) of track. It plans to carry out studies until 2022, start work around 2024, and open the railway in 2027.

=== Missing link around Lake Geneva ===
Location map (TER Rhône-Alpes network), the Tonkin Railway is at the top right of the image.

With the support of the Swiss Confederation, the canton of Valais is investing 24 million Swiss francs to renovate the railroad railway that crosses the Valaisan Chablais between Saint-Maurice and Saint-Gingolph.

On the French side, RFF and SNCF are investing part of the 48 million euros for the installation of automatic signaling (BAL) between Évian and Annemasse.

This means that only 17 km (11 mi) remain for the completion of the Lake Geneva loop (via Montreux and Lausanne) and the Mont Blanc loop (via Saint-Gervais-les-Bains and Chamonix).

With the completion of the CEVA railway, trains will be able to run hourly from Geneva to Thonon-les-Bains, Evian-les-Bains, St. Gingolph, Martigny, Sion, and Brig.

However, freight transport, as mentioned in some speeches, does not seem feasible due to the profile of the railway, as shown in a study by Réseau ferré de France in 2002. In some places (notably around the Évian thermal baths), the gradient is too steep, which would require double traction, as opposed to single traction north of Lake Geneva, and considerable sums for infrastructure renovation.

== See also ==
- Saint-Gingolph–Saint-Maurice railway
- Aix-les-Bains–Annemasse railway
- RegionAlps
- Rail transport in Switzerland
- List of railway lines in France
