= Chamoson-St-Pierre-de-Clages railway station =

Railway station in Chamoson, Switzerland

Chamoson-St-Pierre-de-Clages
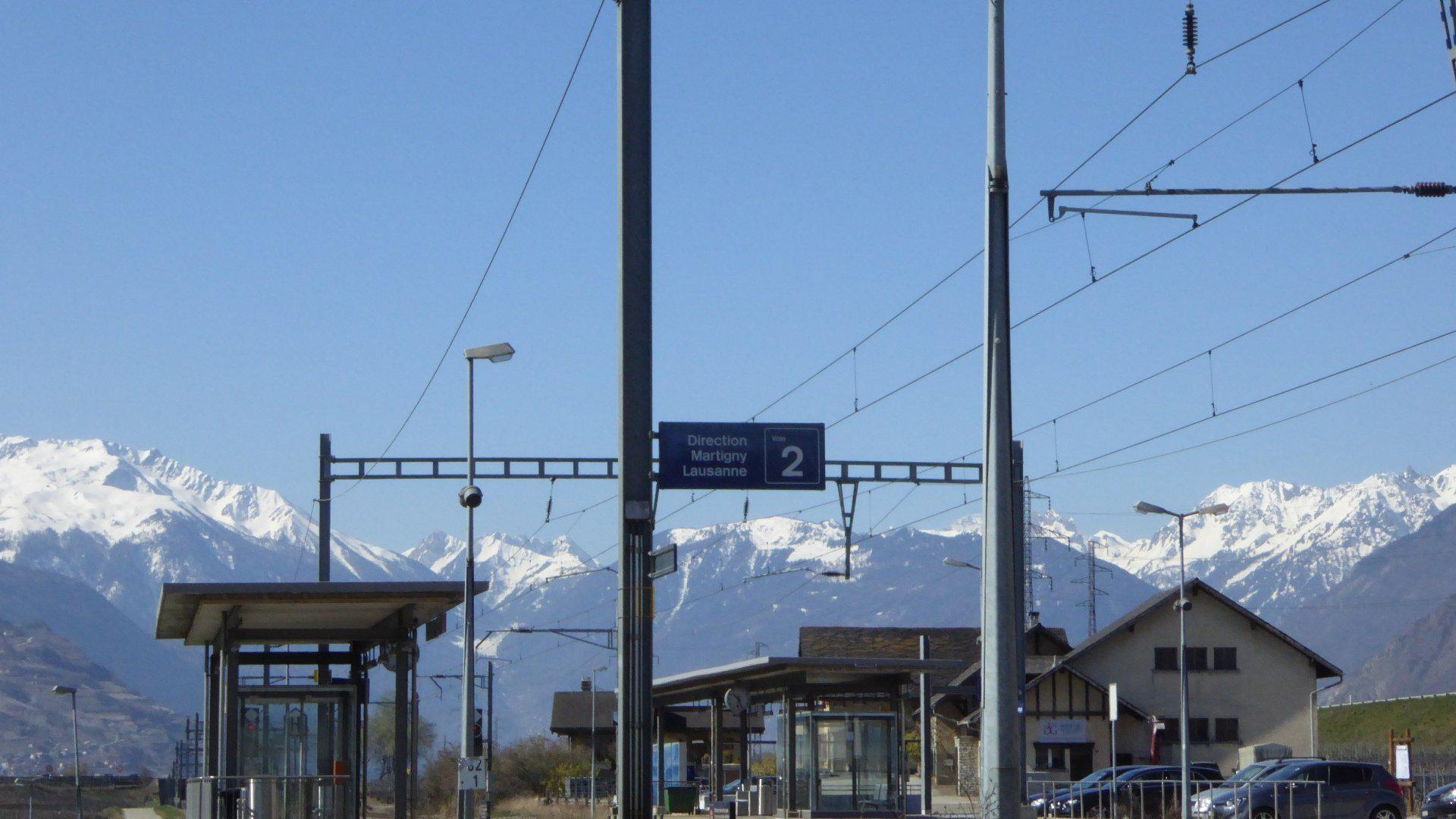
- The station platforms in 2019

General information
- Location: Chamoson; Switzerland
- Coordinates: 46°11′20″N 7°14′28″E
- Elevation: 488 m (1,601 ft)
- Owner: Swiss Federal Railways
- Line: Simplon line
- Distance: 82.1 km (51.0 mi) from Lausanne
- Platforms: 2 side platforms
- Tracks: 2
- Train operators: RegionAlps
- Connections: CarPostal SA bus line

Construction
- Parking: Yes (11 spaces)
- Cycle facilities: Yes (7 spaces)
- Accessible: No

Other information
- Station code: 8501504 (CHA)

History
- Former names: Chamoson (until 2018)

Passengers
- 2023: 380 per weekday (RegionAlps)

Services
Preceding station	RegionAlps	Following station
Riddes towards St-Gingolph	R91	Ardon towards Brig
Riddes towards Monthey	R91	Ardon towards Brig
Location

Chamoson-St-Pierre-de-Clages railway station (French: Gare de Chamoson-St-Pierre-de-Clages, German: Bahnhof Chamoson-St-Pierre-de-Clages) is a railway station in the municipality of Chamoson, in the Swiss canton of Valais. It is an intermediate stop on the Simplon line and is served by local trains only. The station sits in the village of Saint-Pierre-de-Clages, near the 11th century cathedral of the same name.

== Services ==
As of the December 2024 timetable change, the following services stop at Chamoson-St-Pierre-de-Clages:

- Regio: half-hourly service between Monthey and Brig, with every other train continuing from Monthey to St-Gingolph.
