= Vouvry railway station =

Railway station in Vouvry, Switzerland

Vouvry
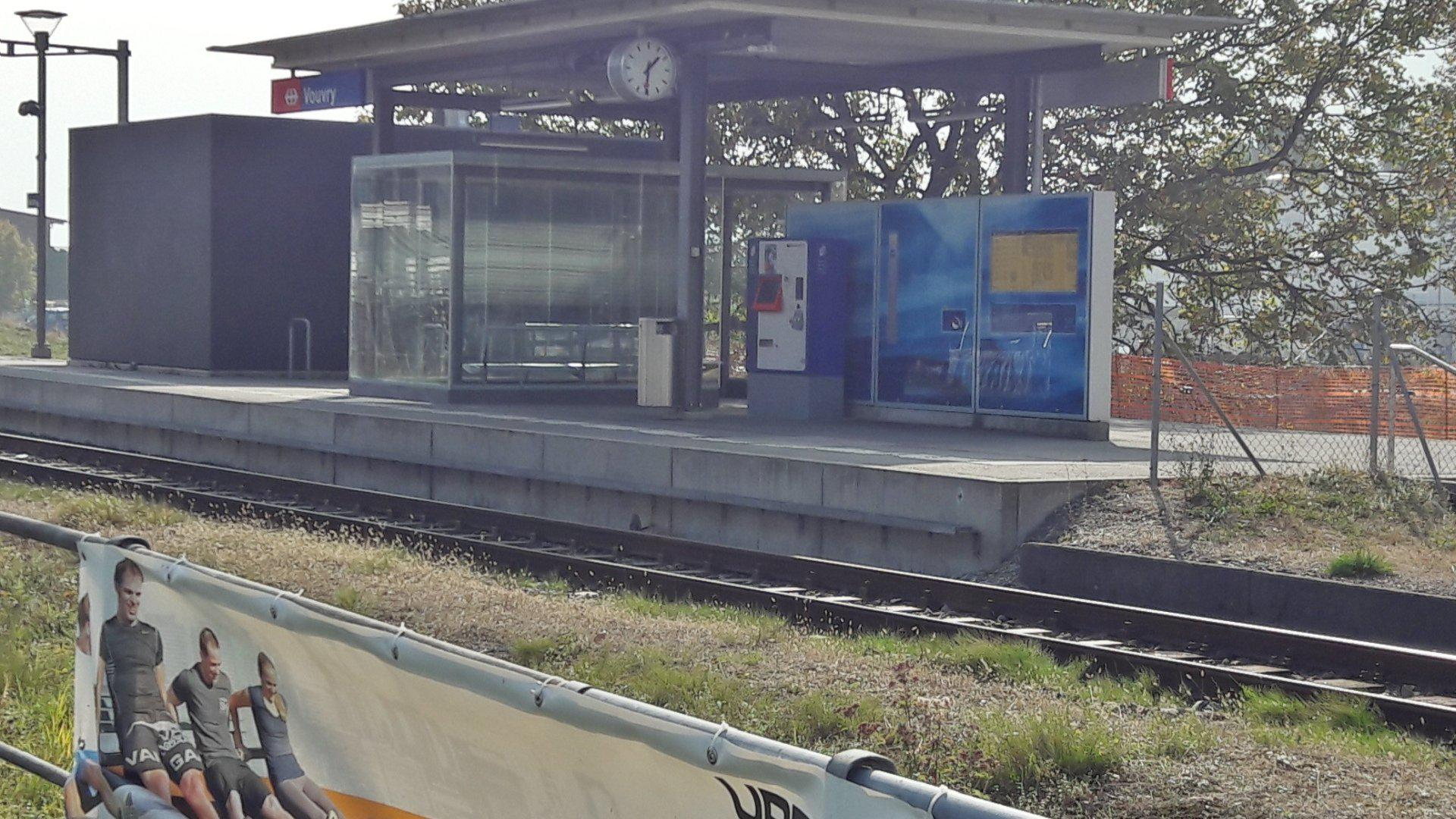
- The station platform in 2018

General information
- Location: Vouvry; Switzerland
- Coordinates: 46°20′N 6°54′E
- Elevation: 381 m (1,250 ft)
- Owner: Swiss Federal Railways
- Line: Saint-Gingolph–Saint-Maurice line
- Distance: 16.3 km (10.1 mi) from St-Maurice
- Platforms: 1 side platform
- Tracks: 1
- Train operators: RegionAlps
- Connections: CarPostal SA buses

Construction
- Cycle facilities: Yes
- Accessible: Yes

Other information
- Station code: 8501424 (VOU)
- Fare zone: 88 (mobilis)

Passengers
- 2023: 720 per weekday (RegionAlps)

Services
Preceding station	RegionAlps	Following station
Les Evouettes towards St-Gingolph	R91	Vionnaz towards Brig
Location

Vouvry railway station (French: Gare de Vouvry, German: Bahnhof Vouvry) is a railway station in the municipality of Vouvry, in the Swiss canton of Valais. It is an intermediate stop on the Saint-Gingolph–Saint-Maurice line and is served by local trains only.

== Services ==
As of the December 2024 timetable change, the following services stop at Vouvry:

- Regio: hourly service between St-Gingolph and Brig.
