= Collombey railway station =

Railway station in Collombey-Muraz, Switzerland

Collombey
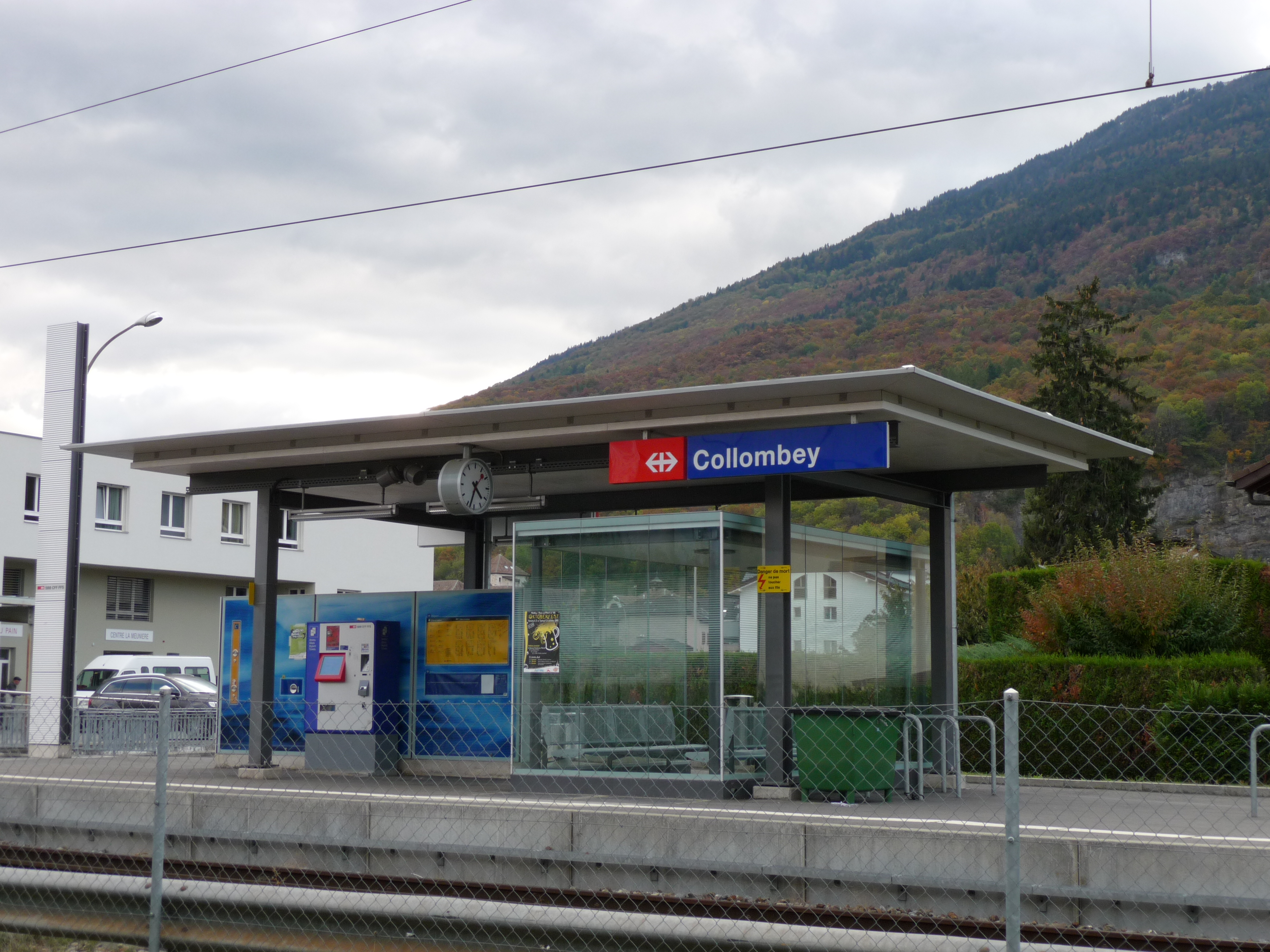
- The station platform in 2009

General information
- Location: Collombey-Muraz; Switzerland
- Coordinates: 46°16′N 6°57′E
- Elevation: 391 m (1,283 ft)
- Owner: Swiss Federal Railways
- Line: Saint-Gingolph–Saint-Maurice line
- Distance: 7.9 km (4.9 mi) from St-Maurice
- Platforms: 1 side platform
- Tracks: 1
- Train operators: RegionAlps
- Connections: CarPostal SA buses; Transports Publics du Chablais buses

Construction
- Parking: Yes (11 spaces)
- Cycle facilities: Yes (12 spaces)
- Accessible: Yes

Other information
- Station code: 8501422 (CBY)
- Fare zone: 83 (mobilis)

Passengers
- 2023: 450 per weekday (RegionAlps)

Services
Preceding station	RegionAlps	Following station
Vionnaz towards St-Gingolph	R91	Monthey towards Brig
Location

Collombey railway station (French: Gare de Collombey, German: Bahnhof Collombey) is a railway station in the municipality of Collombey-Muraz, in the Swiss canton of Valais. It is an intermediate stop on the Saint-Gingolph–Saint-Maurice line and is served by local trains only.

The tracks of the 1,000 mm (3 ft 3 3/8 in) Aigle–Ollon–Monthey–Champéry line cross over the Saint-Gingolph–Saint-Maurice line north of the station. Two stations on the Aigle–Ollon–Monthey–Champéry line, Collombey-Muraz and Corbier, are each located about 230 metres (750 ft) from Collombey.

== Services ==
As of the December 2024 timetable change, the following services stop at Collombey:

- Regio: hourly service between St-Gingolph and Brig.
