= Vionnaz railway station =

Railway station in Collombey-Muraz, Switzerland

Vionnaz
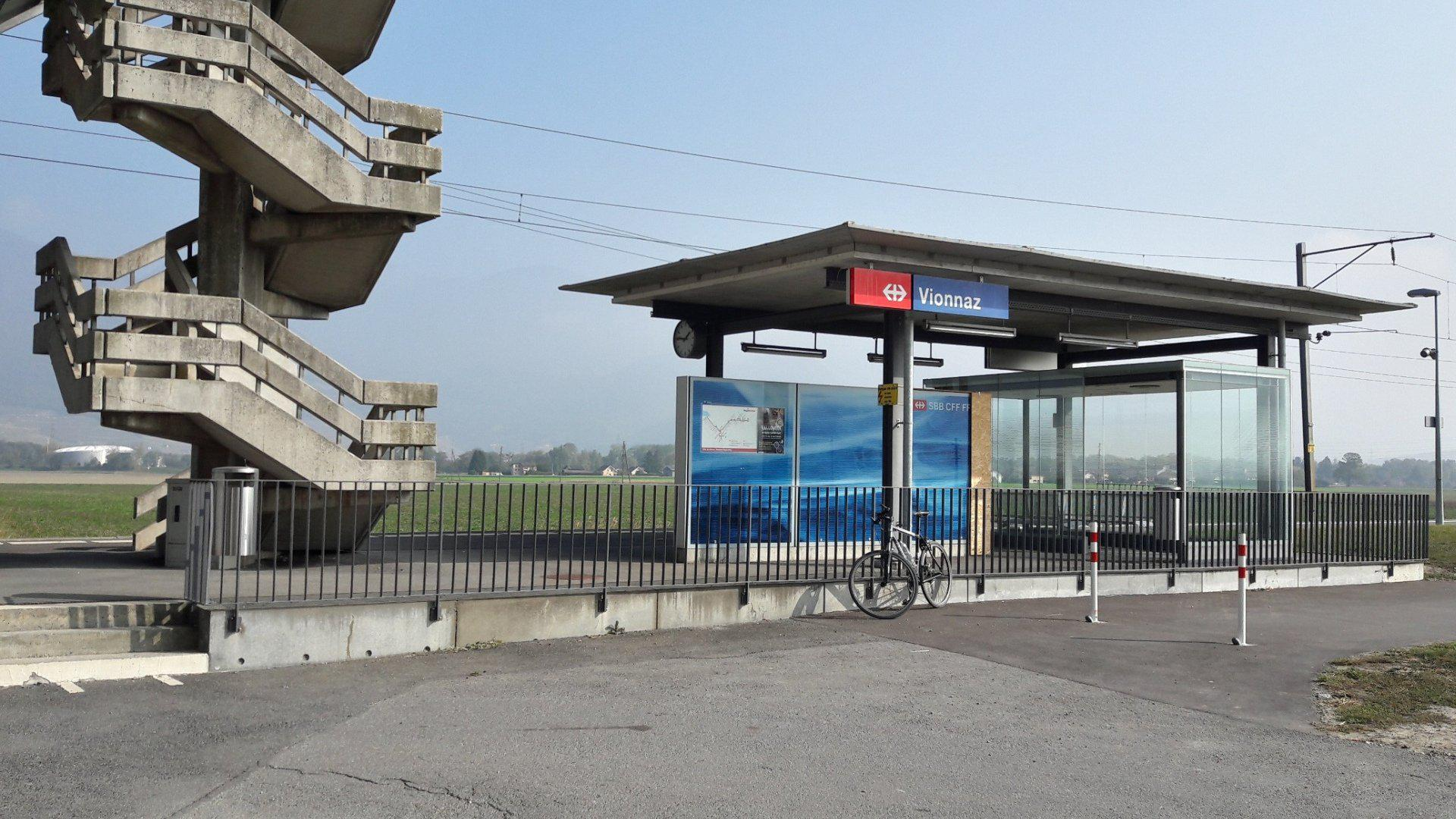
- The station platform in 2018

General information
- Location: Collombey-Muraz; Switzerland
- Coordinates: 46°19′N 6°55′E
- Elevation: 383 m (1,257 ft)
- Owner: Swiss Federal Railways
- Line: Saint-Gingolph–Saint-Maurice line
- Distance: 13.4 km (8.3 mi) from St-Maurice
- Platforms: 1 side platform
- Tracks: 1
- Train operators: RegionAlps
- Connections: CarPostal SA buses

Construction
- Cycle facilities: Yes (5 spaces)
- Accessible: Yes

Other information
- Station code: 8501423 (VIO)
- Fare zone: 87 and 88 (mobilis)

Passengers
- 2023: 170 per weekday (RegionAlps)

Services
Preceding station	RegionAlps	Following station
Vouvry towards St-Gingolph	R91	Collombey towards Brig
Location

Vionnaz railway station (French: Gare de Vionnaz, German: Bahnhof Vionnaz) is a railway station in the municipality of Collombey-Muraz, in the Swiss canton of Valais. It is an intermediate stop on the Saint-Gingolph–Saint-Maurice line and is served by local trains only. The station serves the municipality of Vionnaz, located on the opposite side of the Canal du Bras Neuf.

== Services ==
As of the December 2024 timetable change, the following services stop at Vionnaz:

- Regio: hourly service between St-Gingolph and Brig.
