= Gampel-Steg railway station =

Railway station in Steg-Hohtenn, Switzerland

Gampel-Steg
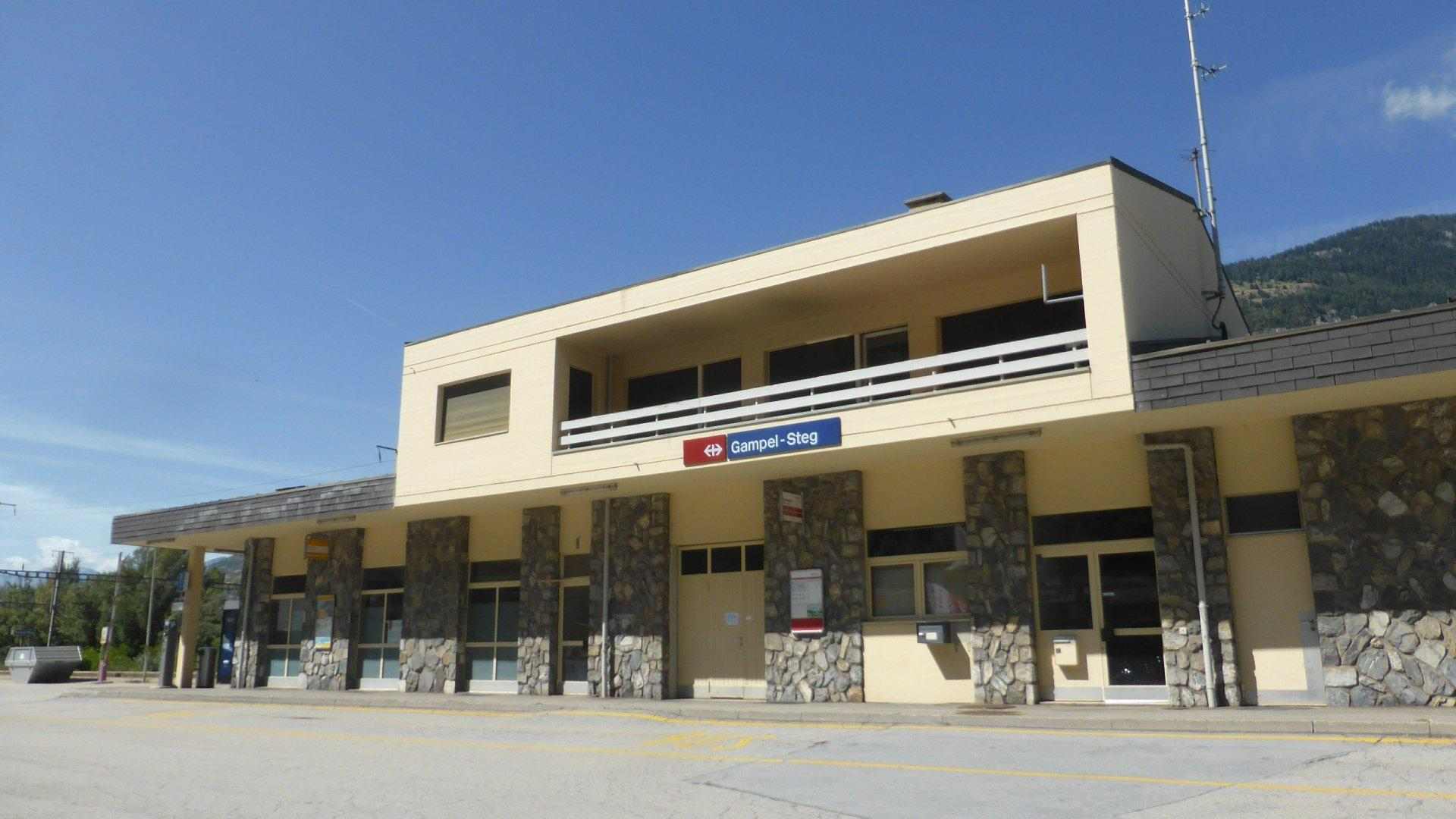
- The station building in 2018

General information
- Location: Steg-Hohtenn; Switzerland
- Coordinates: 46°18′23″N 7°44′51″E
- Elevation: 631 m (2,070 ft)
- Owner: Swiss Federal Railways
- Line: Simplon line
- Distance: 125.9 km (78.2 mi) from Lausanne
- Platforms: 2 (1 island platform)
- Tracks: 5
- Train operators: RegionAlps
- Connections: RegionAlps bus lines; PostAuto AG bus line

Construction
- Parking: Yes (49 spaces)
- Cycle facilities: Yes (28 spaces)
- Accessible: No

Other information
- Station code: 8501603 (GA)

Passengers
- 2023: 950 per weekday (RegionAlps)

Services
| Preceding station | RegionAlps | Following station |
|---|---|---|
| Turtmann towards St-Gingolph | R91 | Raron towards Brig |
| Turtmann towards Monthey | R91 | Raron towards Brig |
Location

Gampel-Steg railway station (German: Bahnhof Gampel-Steg, French: Gare de Gampel-Steg) is a railway station in the municipality of Steg-Hohtenn, in the Swiss canton of Valais. It is an intermediate stop on the Simplon line and is served by local trains only.

== Services ==
As of the December 2024 timetable change, the following services stop at Gampel-Steg:

- Regio: half-hourly service between Monthey and Brig, with every other train continuing from Monthey to St-Gingolph.
