= Ardon railway station =

Railway station in Ardon, Switzerland

Ardon
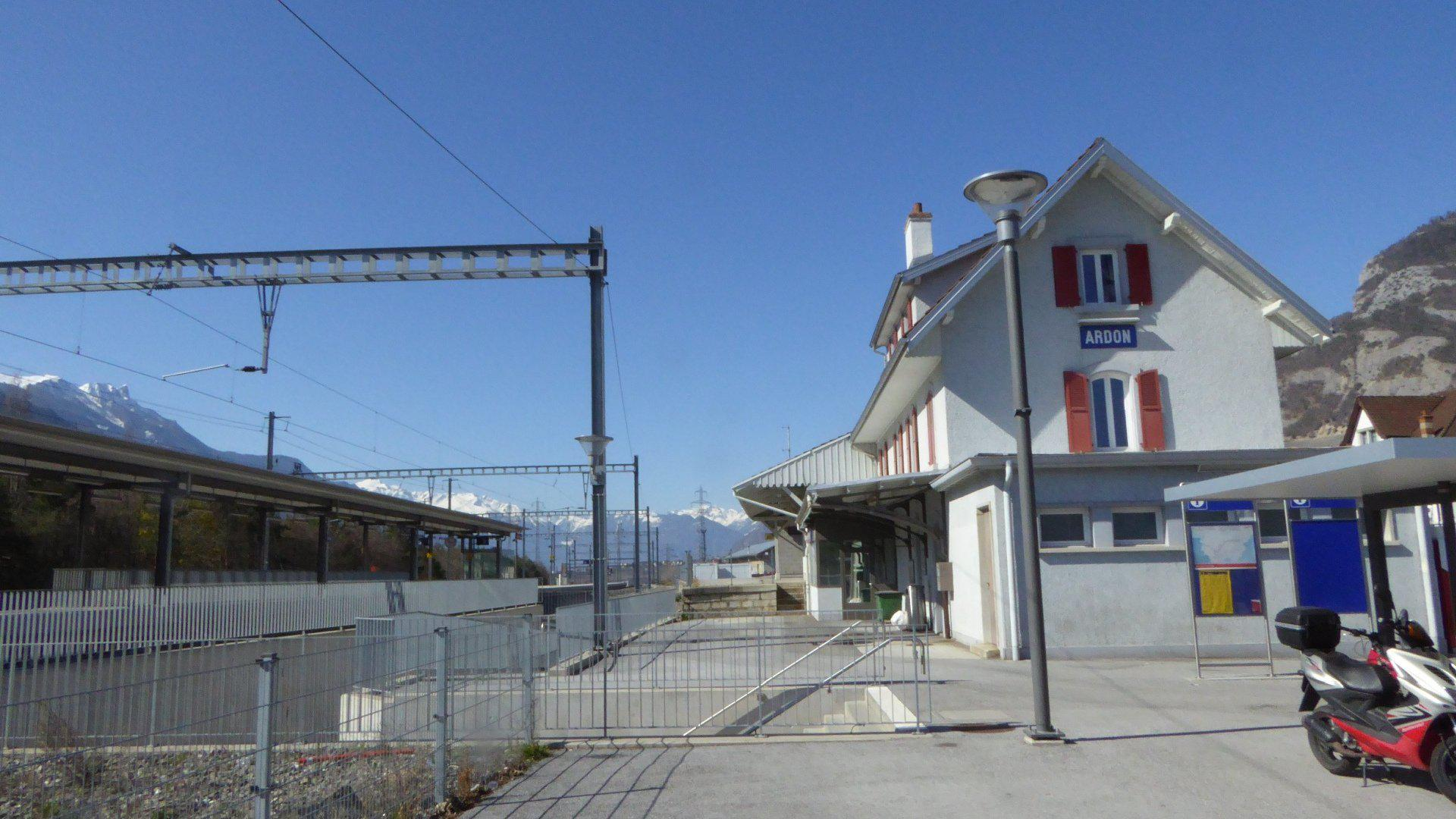
- The station building in 2019

General information
- Location: Ardon; Switzerland
- Coordinates: 46°12′31″N 7°16′15″E
- Elevation: 487 m (1,598 ft)
- Owner: Swiss Federal Railways
- Line: Simplon line
- Distance: 85.3 km (53.0 mi) from Lausanne
- Platforms: 2 (1 island platform)
- Tracks: 3
- Train operators: RegionAlps

Construction
- Parking: Yes (23 spaces)
- Cycle facilities: Yes (17 spaces)
- Accessible: Yes

Other information
- Station code: 8501505 (ARD)

Passengers
- 2023: 950 per weekday (RegionAlps)

Services
Preceding station	RegionAlps	Following station
Chamoson-St-Pierre-de-Clages towards St-Gingolph	R91	Châteauneuf-Conthey towards Brig
Chamoson-St-Pierre-de-Clages towards Monthey	R91	Châteauneuf-Conthey towards Brig
Location

Ardon railway station (French: Gare d'Ardon, German: Bahnhof Ardon) is a railway station in the municipality of Ardon, in the Swiss canton of Valais. It is an intermediate stop on the Simplon line and is served by local trains only.

== Services ==
As of the December 2025 timetable change, the following services stop at Ardon:

- Regio: half-hourly service between Monthey and Brig, with every other train continuing from Monthey to St-Gingolph.
