= Châteauneuf-Conthey railway station =

Railway station in Conthey, Switzerland

Châteauneuf-Conthey
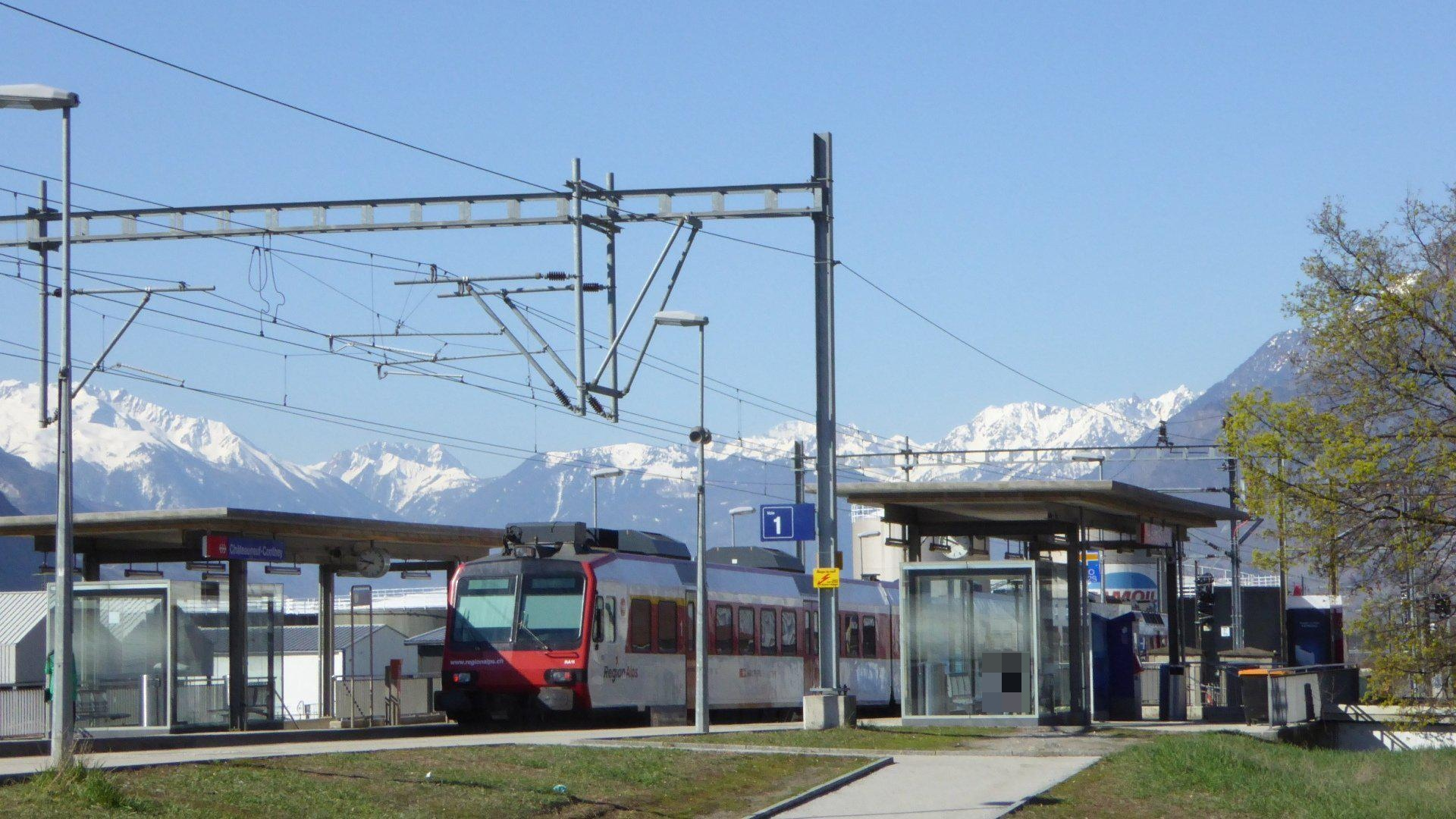
- The station building in 2018

General information
- Location: Conthey; Switzerland
- Coordinates: 46°12′58″N 7°18′18″E
- Elevation: 488 m (1,601 ft)
- Owner: Swiss Federal Railways
- Line: Simplon line
- Distance: 88.1 km (54.7 mi) from Lausanne
- Platforms: 2 side platforms
- Tracks: 2
- Train operators: RegionAlps
- Connections: CarPostal SA bus line

Construction
- Parking: Yes (26 spaces)
- Cycle facilities: Yes (14 spaces)
- Accessible: Yes

Other information
- Station code: 8501510 (CHF)

Passengers
- 2023: 1'200 per weekday (RegionAlps)

Services
Preceding station	RegionAlps	Following station
Ardon towards St-Gingolph	R91	Sion towards Brig
Ardon towards Monthey	R91	Sion towards Brig
Location

Châteauneuf-Conthey railway station (French: Gare de Châteauneuf-Conthey, German: Bahnhof Châteauneuf-Conthey) is a railway station in the municipality of Conthey, in the Swiss canton of Valais. It is an intermediate stop on the Simplon line and is served by local trains only.

== Services ==
As of the December 2024 timetable change, the following services stop at Châteauneuf-Conthey:

- Regio: half-hourly service between Monthey and Brig, with every other train continuing from Monthey to St-Gingolph.
