= Salgesch railway station =

Railway station in Salgesch, Switzerland

Salgesch
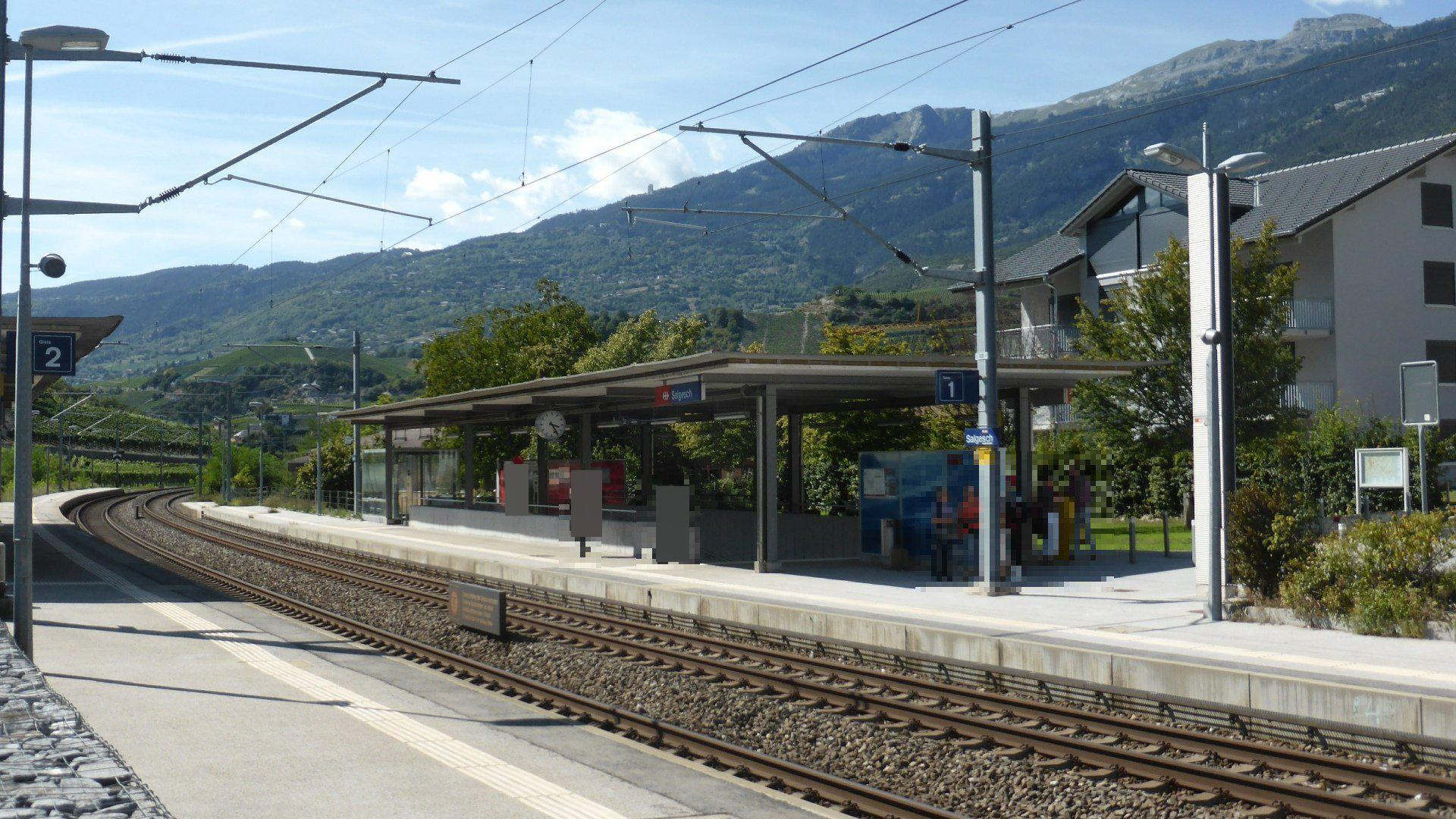
- The station building in 2018

General information
- Location: Salgesch; Switzerland
- Coordinates: 46°18′33″N 7°34′41″E
- Elevation: 575 m (1,886 ft)
- Owner: Swiss Federal Railways
- Line: Simplon line
- Distance: 112.3 km (69.8 mi) from Lausanne
- Platforms: 2 side platforms
- Tracks: 2
- Train operators: RegionAlps
- Connections: LLB bus line

Construction
- Cycle facilities: Yes (28 spaces)
- Accessible: Partly

Other information
- Station code: 8501600 (SAL)

Passengers
- 2023: 440 per weekday (RegionAlps)

Services
| Preceding station | RegionAlps | Following station |
|---|---|---|
| Sierre/Siders towards St-Gingolph | R91 | Leuk towards Brig |
| Sierre/Siders towards Monthey | R91 | Leuk towards Brig |
Location

Salgesch railway station (French: Gare de Salgesch, German: Bahnhof Salgesch) is a railway station in the municipality of Salgesch, in the Swiss canton of Valais. It is an intermediate stop on the Simplon line and is served by local trains only.

== Services ==
As of the December 2024 timetable change, the following services stop at Salgesch:

- Regio: half-hourly service between Monthey and Brig, with every other train continuing from Monthey to St-Gingolph.
