= Sierre/Siders railway station =

Railway station in Sierre, Switzerland

Sierre/Siders
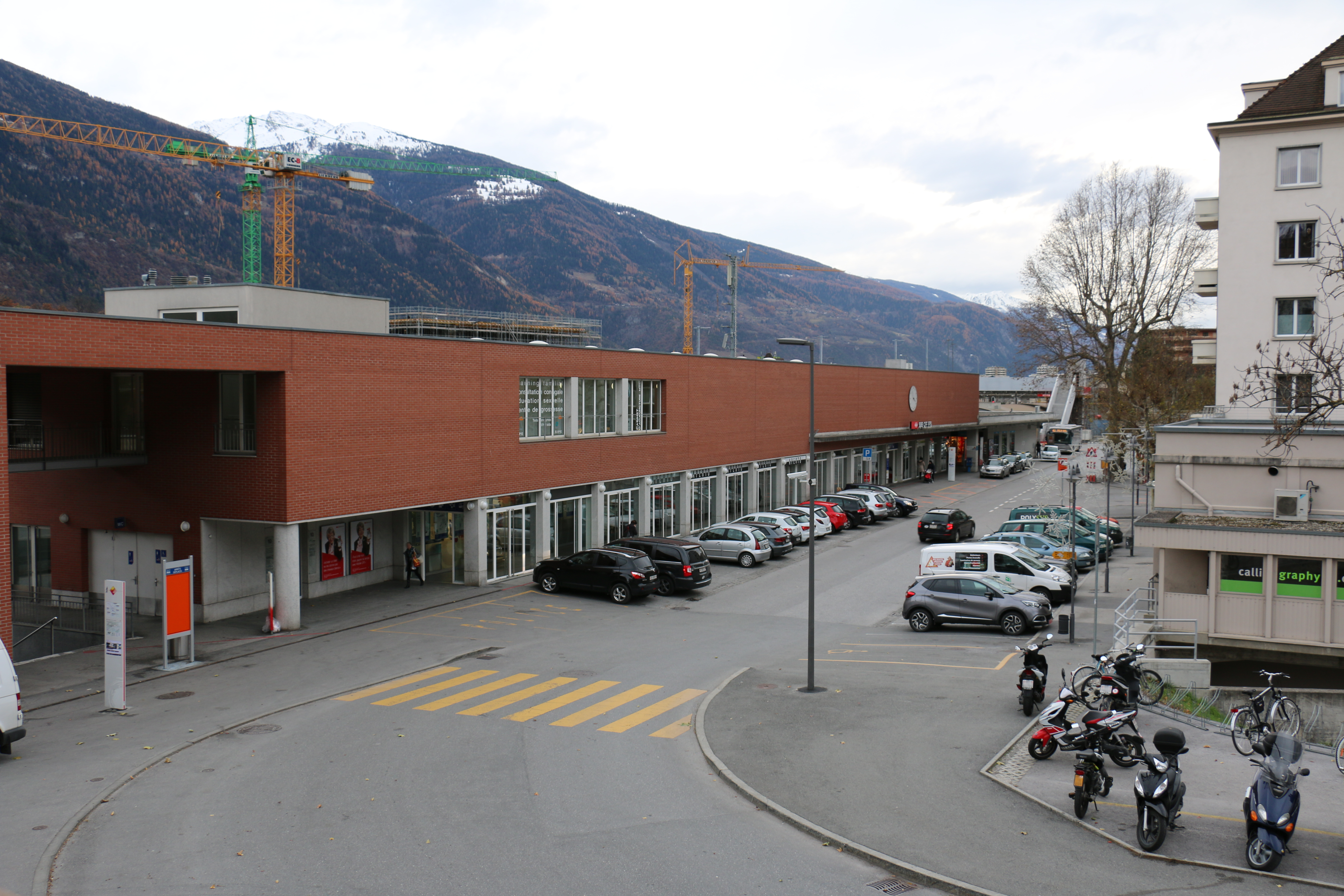
- The station building in 2016

General information
- Location: Sierre; Switzerland
- Coordinates: 46°17′32″N 7°31′58″E
- Elevation: 533 m (1,749 ft)
- Owner: Swiss Federal Railways
- Line: Simplon line
- Distance: 108.1 km (67.2 mi) from Lausanne
- Platforms: 3; 1 side platform; 1 island platform
- Tracks: 3
- Train operators: RegionAlps; Swiss Federal Railways
- Connections: CarPostal SA bus lines; LLB bus line; Bus Sierrois bus lines; SMC bus lines

Construction
- Parking: Yes (133 spaces)
- Cycle facilities: Yes (459 spaces)
- Accessible: Yes

Other information
- Station code: 8501509 (SIE)
- IATA code: ZKO

Passengers
- 2023: 7'800 per weekday (RegionAlps, SBB)

Services
Preceding station	SBB CFF FFS	Following station
Sion towards Geneva Airport	IR 90	Visp towards Brig
Sion towards Geneva Airport	IR 95	Leuk towards Brig
Preceding station	RegionAlps	Following station
St-Léonard towards St-Gingolph	R91	Salgesch towards Brig
St-Léonard towards Monthey	R91	Salgesch towards Brig
Location

Sierre/Siders railway station (French: Gare de Sierre, German: Bahnhof Siders) is a railway station in the municipality of Sierre, in the Swiss canton of Valais. It is an intermediate stop on the Simplon line and is served by local and long-distance trains.

The base station of Funiculaire Sierre–Montana–Crans, the funicular to Crans-Montana, is located nearby at Rue du Pradec.

== Services ==
As of the December 2024 timetable change, the following services stop at Sierre/Siders:

- InterRegio: half-hourly service between Geneva Airport and Brig.
- Regio: half-hourly service between Monthey and Brig, with every other train continuing from Monthey to St-Gingolph.
