= Raron railway station =

Railway station in Raron, Switzerland

Raron
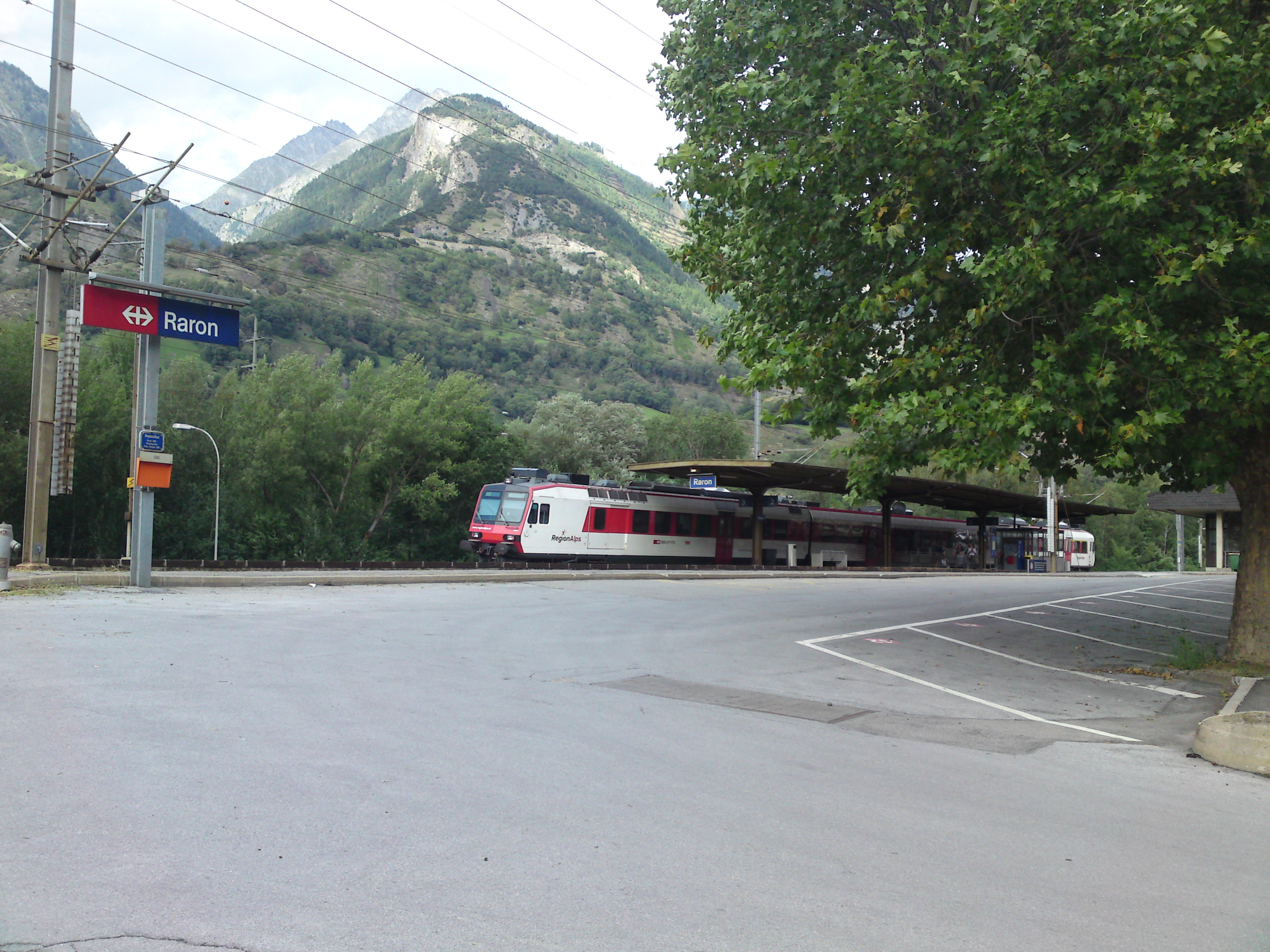
- RegionAlps train at Raron in 2010

General information
- Location: Raron; Switzerland
- Coordinates: 46°18′23″N 7°48′05″E
- Elevation: 638 m (2,093 ft)
- Owner: Swiss Federal Railways
- Line: Simplon line
- Distance: 130.1 km (80.8 mi) from Lausanne
- Platforms: 2 (1 island platform)
- Tracks: 3
- Train operators: RegionAlps
- Connections: RegionAlps bus lines

Construction
- Parking: Yes (38 spaces)
- Cycle facilities: Yes (44 spaces)
- Accessible: No

Other information
- Station code: 8501604 (RAR)

Passengers
- 2023: 1'000 per weekday (RegionAlps)

Services
Preceding station	RegionAlps	Following station
Gampel-Steg towards St-Gingolph	R91	Visp towards Brig
Gampel-Steg towards Monthey	R91	Visp towards Brig
Location

Raron railway station (German: Bahnhof Raron, French: Gare de Rarogne) is a railway station in the municipality of Raron, in the Swiss canton of Valais. It is an intermediate stop on the Simplon line and is served by local trains only.

== Services ==
As of the December 2024 timetable change, the following services stop at Raron:

- Regio: half-hourly service between Monthey and Brig, with every other train continuing from Monthey to St-Gingolph.
