= Riddes railway station =

Railway station in Riddes, Switzerland

Riddes
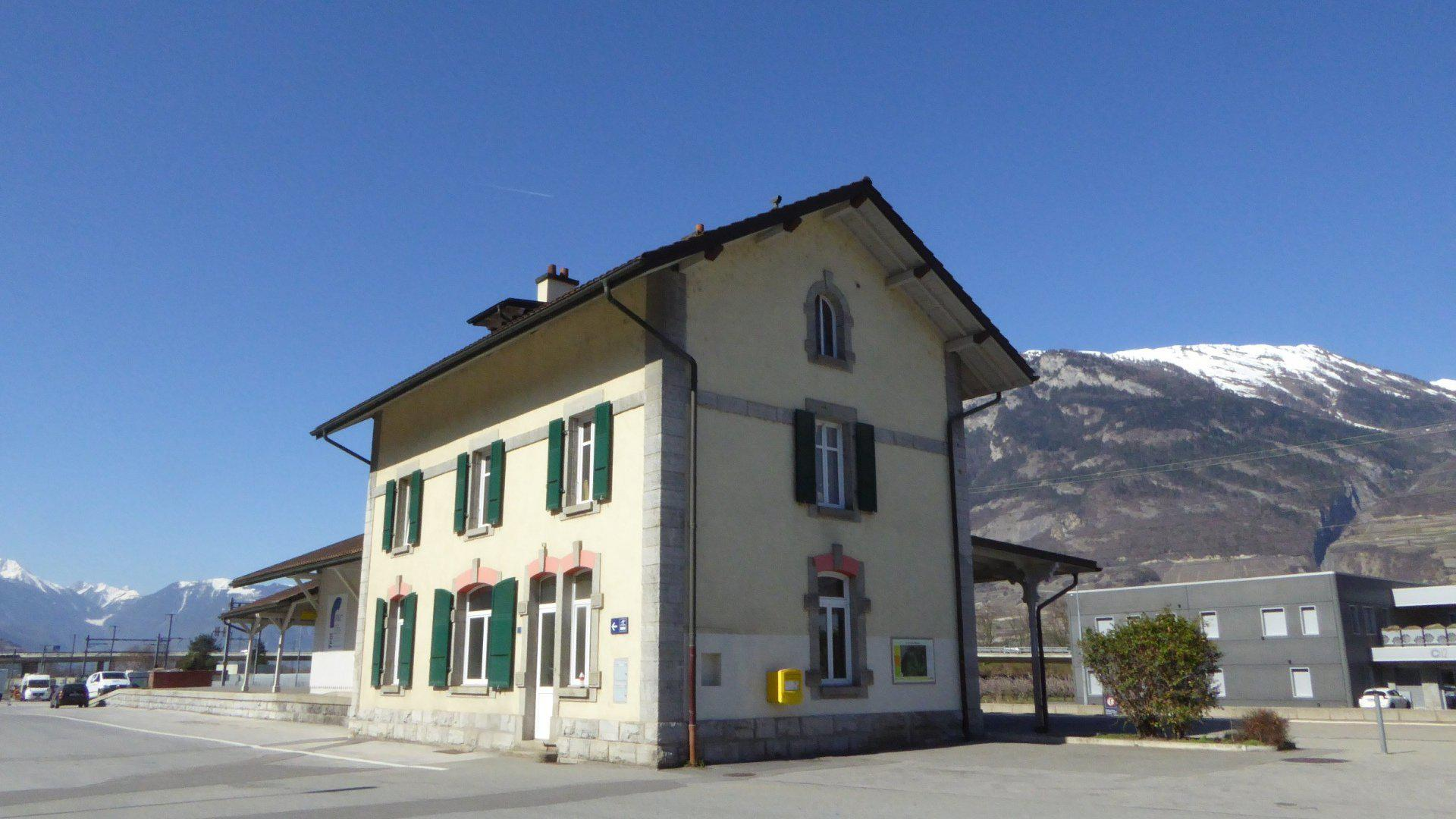
- The station building in 2019

General information
- Location: Riddes; Switzerland
- Coordinates: 46°10′21″N 7°13′04″E
- Elevation: 470 m (1,540 ft)
- Owner: Swiss Federal Railways
- Line: Simplon line
- Distance: 79.6 km (49.5 mi) from Lausanne
- Platforms: 2 side platforms
- Tracks: 2
- Train operators: RegionAlps
- Connections: CarPostal SA bus lines

Construction
- Parking: Yes (18 spaces)
- Cycle facilities: Yes (6 spaces)
- Accessible: Yes

Other information
- Station code: 8501503 (RID)

Passengers
- 2023: 1'200 per weekday (RegionAlps)

Services
Preceding station	RegionAlps	Following station
Saxon towards St-Gingolph	R91	Chamoson-St-Pierre-de-Clages towards Brig
Saxon towards Monthey	R91	Chamoson-St-Pierre-de-Clages towards Brig
Location

Riddes railway station (French: Gare de Riddes, German: Bahnhof Riddes) is a railway station in the municipality of Riddes, in the Swiss canton of Valais. It is an intermediate stop on the Simplon line and is served by local trains only.

== Services ==
As of the December 2024 timetable change, the following services stop at Riddes:

- Regio: half-hourly service between Monthey and Brig, with every other train continuing from Monthey to St-Gingolph.
