= Turtmann railway station =

Railway station in Turtmann-Unterems, Switzerland

Turtmann
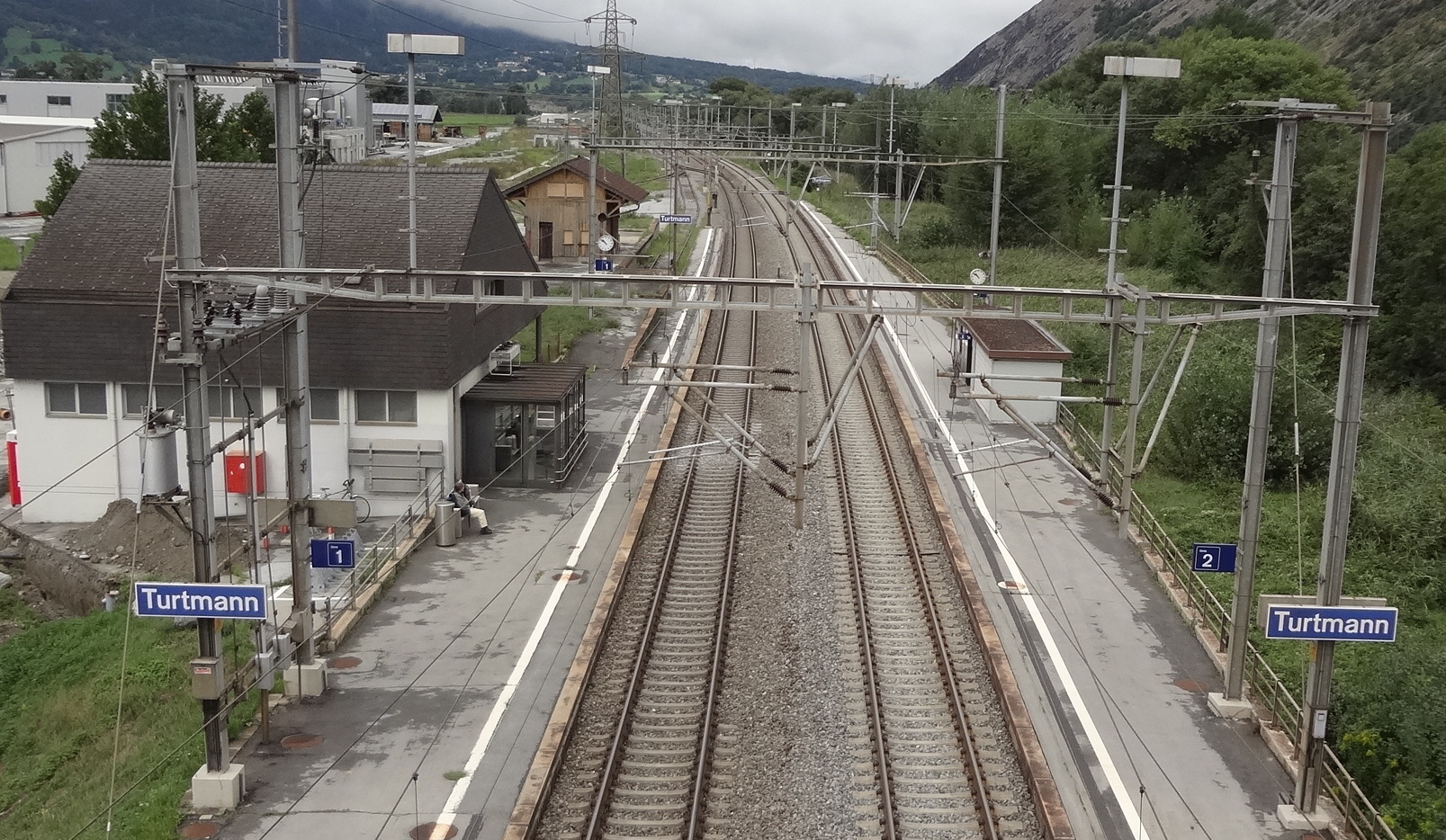
- The station building in 2015

General information
- Location: Turtmann-Unterems; Switzerland
- Coordinates: 46°18′34″N 7°41′59″E
- Elevation: 624 m (2,047 ft)
- Owner: Swiss Federal Railways
- Line: Simplon line
- Distance: 122.1 km (75.9 mi) from Lausanne
- Platforms: 2 side platforms
- Tracks: 2
- Train operators: RegionAlps
- Connections: RegionAlps bus lines

Construction
- Parking: Yes (15 spaces)
- Cycle facilities: Yes (41 spaces)
- Accessible: No

Other information
- Station code: 8501602 (TUR)

Passengers
- 2023: 380 per weekday (RegionAlps)

Services
Preceding station	RegionAlps	Following station
Leuk towards St-Gingolph	R91	Gampel-Steg towards Brig
Leuk towards Monthey	R91	Gampel-Steg towards Brig
Location

Turtmann railway station (German: Bahnhof Turtmann, French: Gare de Tourtemagne) is a railway station in the municipality of Turtmann-Unterems, in the Swiss canton of Valais. It is an intermediate stop on the Simplon line and is served by local trains only.

== Services ==
As of the December 2024 timetable change, the following services stop at Turtmann:

- Regio: half-hourly service between Monthey and Brig, with every other train continuing from Monthey to St-Gingolph.
