= Massongex railway station =

Railway station in Massongex, Switzerland

Massongex
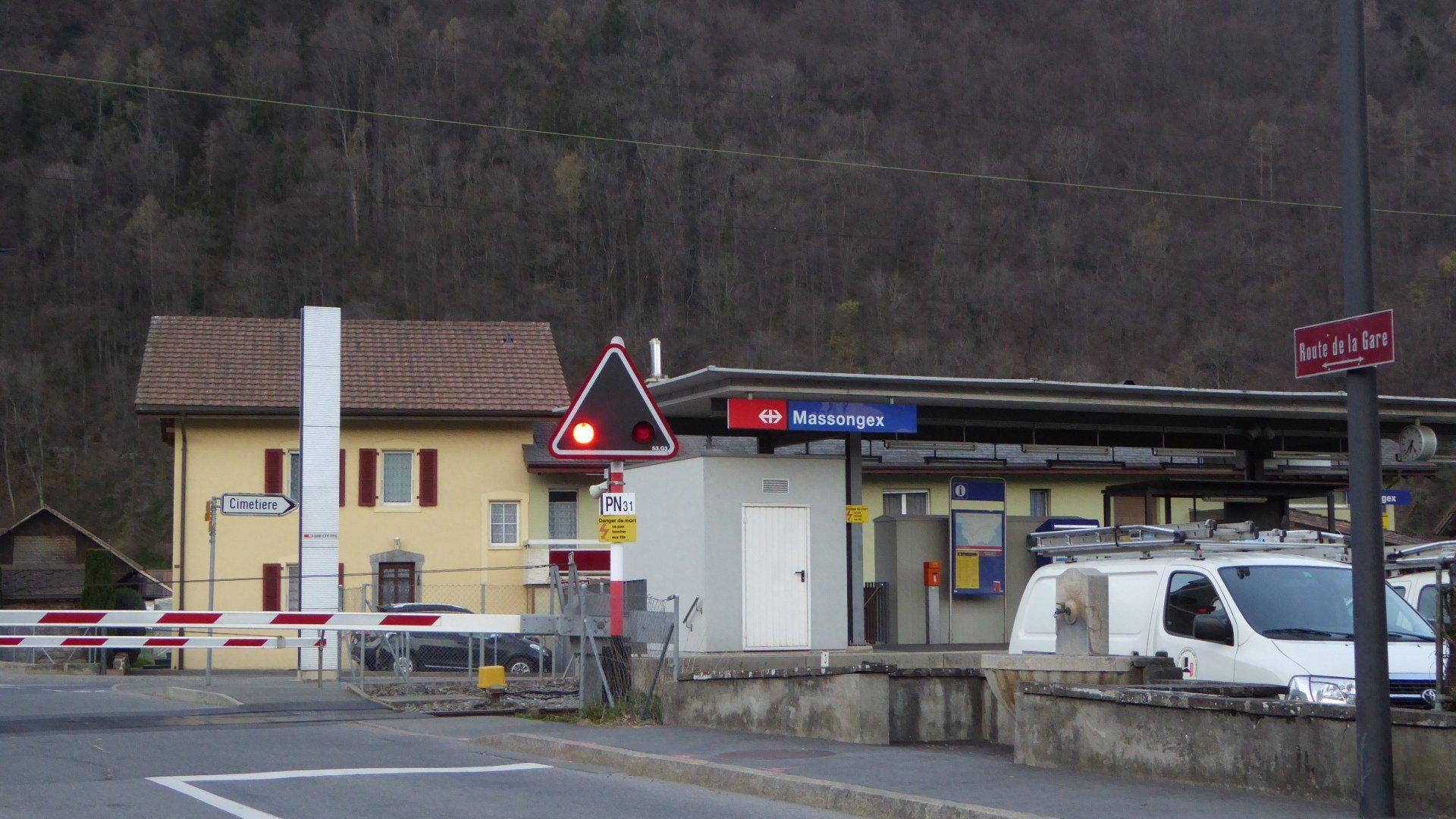
- The station platform in 2019

General information
- Location: Massongex; Switzerland
- Coordinates: 46°14′N 6°59′E
- Elevation: 399 m (1,309 ft)
- Owner: Swiss Federal Railways
- Line: Saint-Gingolph–Saint-Maurice line
- Distance: 3.2 km (2.0 mi) from St-Maurice
- Platforms: 1 side platform
- Tracks: 1
- Train operators: RegionAlps
- Connections: CarPostal SA bus line; Transports Publics du Chablais buses

Construction
- Cycle facilities: Yes (10 spaces)
- Accessible: Yes

Other information
- Station code: 8501420 (MAS)
- Fare zone: 84 (mobilis)

Passengers
- 2023: 360 per weekday (RegionAlps)

Services
Preceding station	RegionAlps	Following station
Monthey towards St-Gingolph	R91	St-Maurice towards Brig
Monthey Terminus	R91	St-Maurice towards Brig
Location

Massongex railway station (French: Gare de Massongex, German: Bahnhof Massongex) is a railway station in the municipality of Massongex, in the Swiss canton of Valais. It is an intermediate stop on the Saint-Gingolph–Saint-Maurice line and is served by local trains only.

== Services ==
As of the December 2024 timetable change, the following services stop at Massongex:

- Regio: half-hourly service between Monthey and Brig, with every other train continuing from Monthey to St-Gingolph.
