= Leuk railway station =

Railway station in Leuk, Switzerland

Leuk
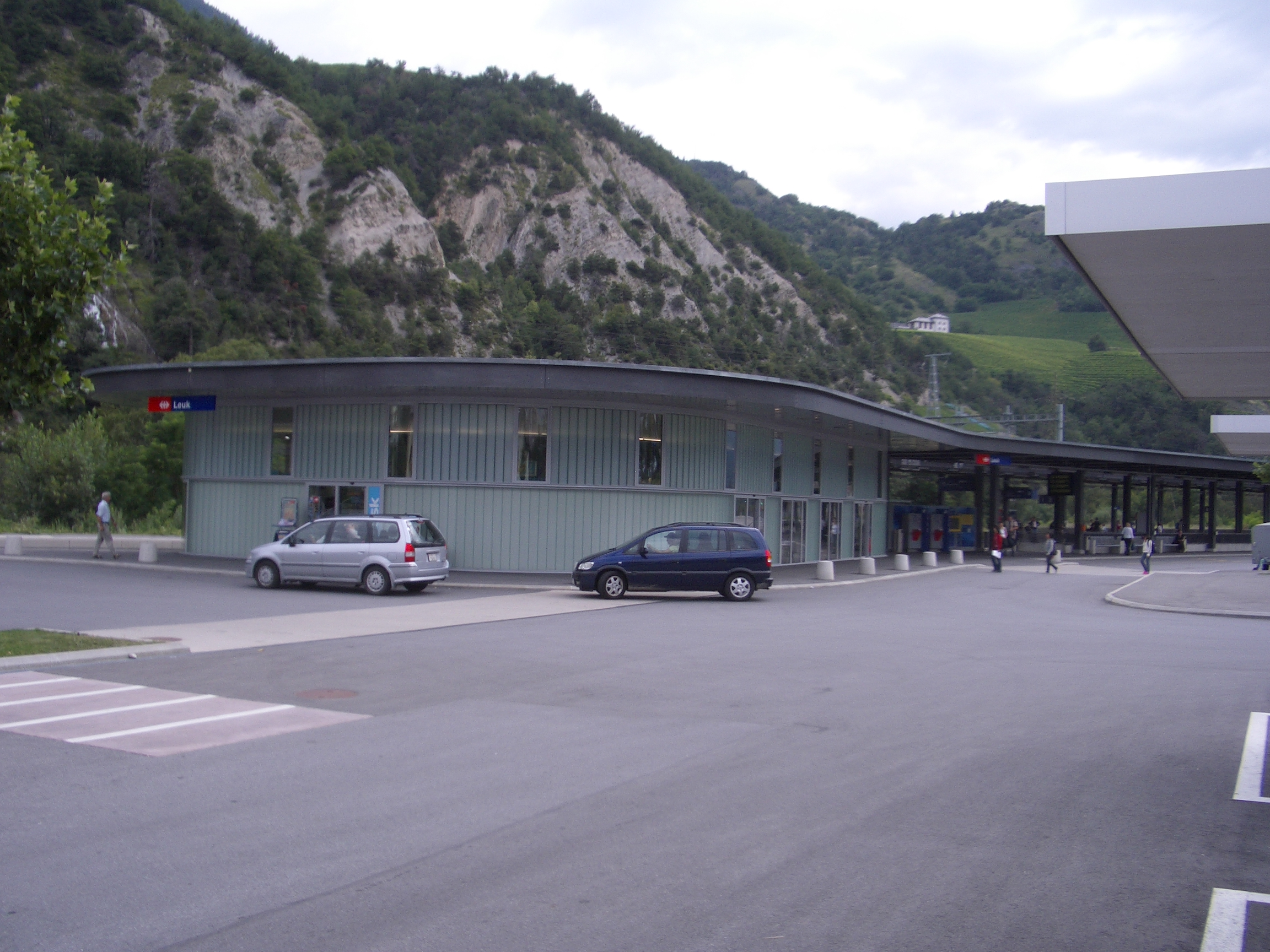
- The station building in 2007

General information
- Location: Leuk; Switzerland
- Coordinates: 46°18′42″N 7°38′42″E
- Elevation: 623 m (2,044 ft)
- Owner: Swiss Federal Railways
- Line: Simplon line
- Distance: 117.6 km (73.1 mi) from Lausanne
- Platforms: 2 side platforms
- Tracks: 2
- Train operators: RegionAlps; Swiss Federal Railways
- Connections: LLB bus lines; RegionAlps bus line

Construction
- Parking: Yes (132 spaces)
- Cycle facilities: Yes (71 spaces)
- Accessible: Yes

Other information
- Station code: 8501601 (LK)

Passengers
- 2023: 2'400 per weekday (RegionAlps, SBB)

Services
Preceding station	SBB CFF FFS	Following station
Sierre/Siders towards Geneva Airport	IR 95	Visp towards Brig
Preceding station	RegionAlps	Following station
Salgesch towards St-Gingolph	R91	Turtmann towards Brig
Salgesch towards Monthey	R91	Turtmann towards Brig
Location

Leuk railway station (French: Gare de Loèche, German: Bahnhof Leuk) is a railway station in the municipality of Leuk, in the Swiss canton of Valais. It is an intermediate stop on the Simplon line and is served by local and long-distance trains.

== Services ==
As of the December 2024 timetable change, the following services stop at Leuk:

- InterRegio: hourly service between Geneva Airport and Brig.
- Regio: half-hourly service between Monthey and Brig, with every other train continuing from Monthey to St-Gingolph.

== Gallery ==
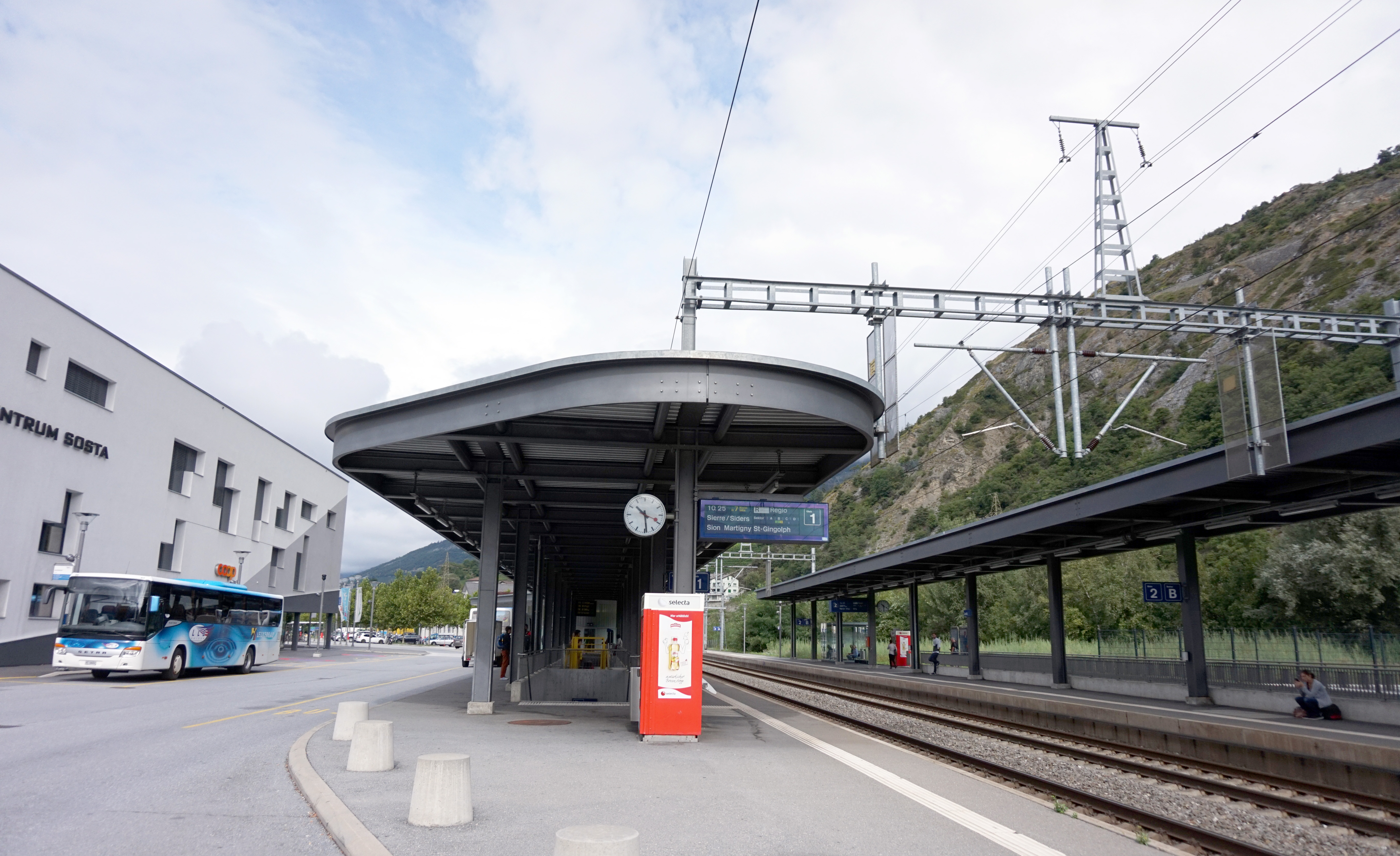
platforms, underpass and railway station square (2015)

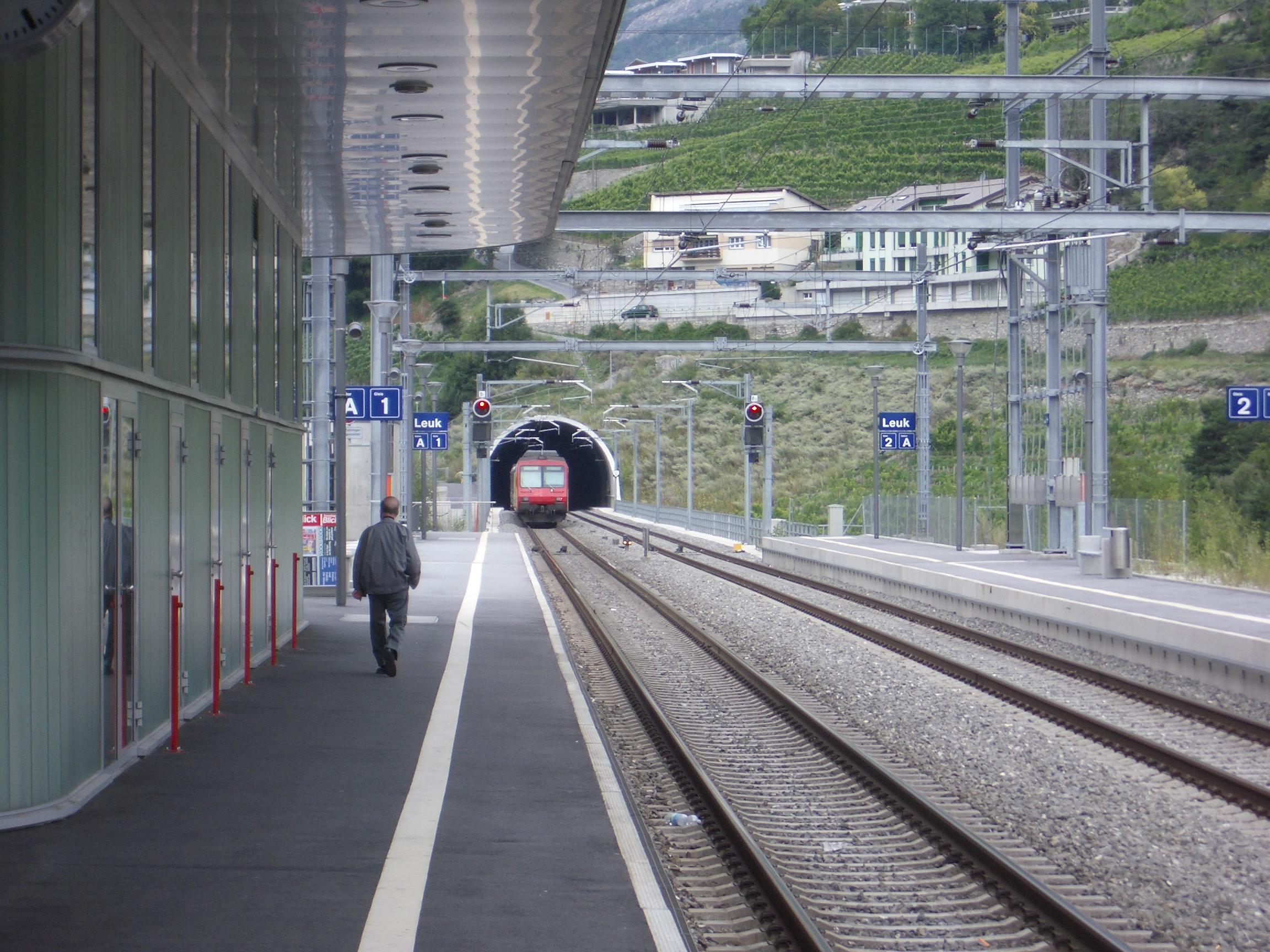
tunnel portal at the station (2007)

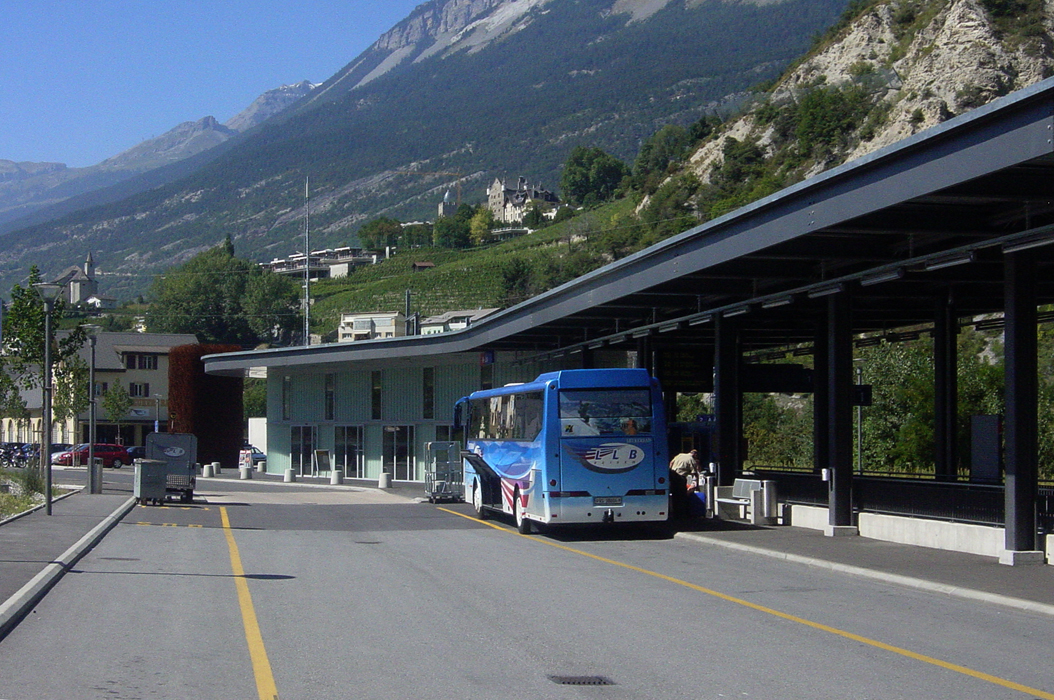
station's bus stop (2006)

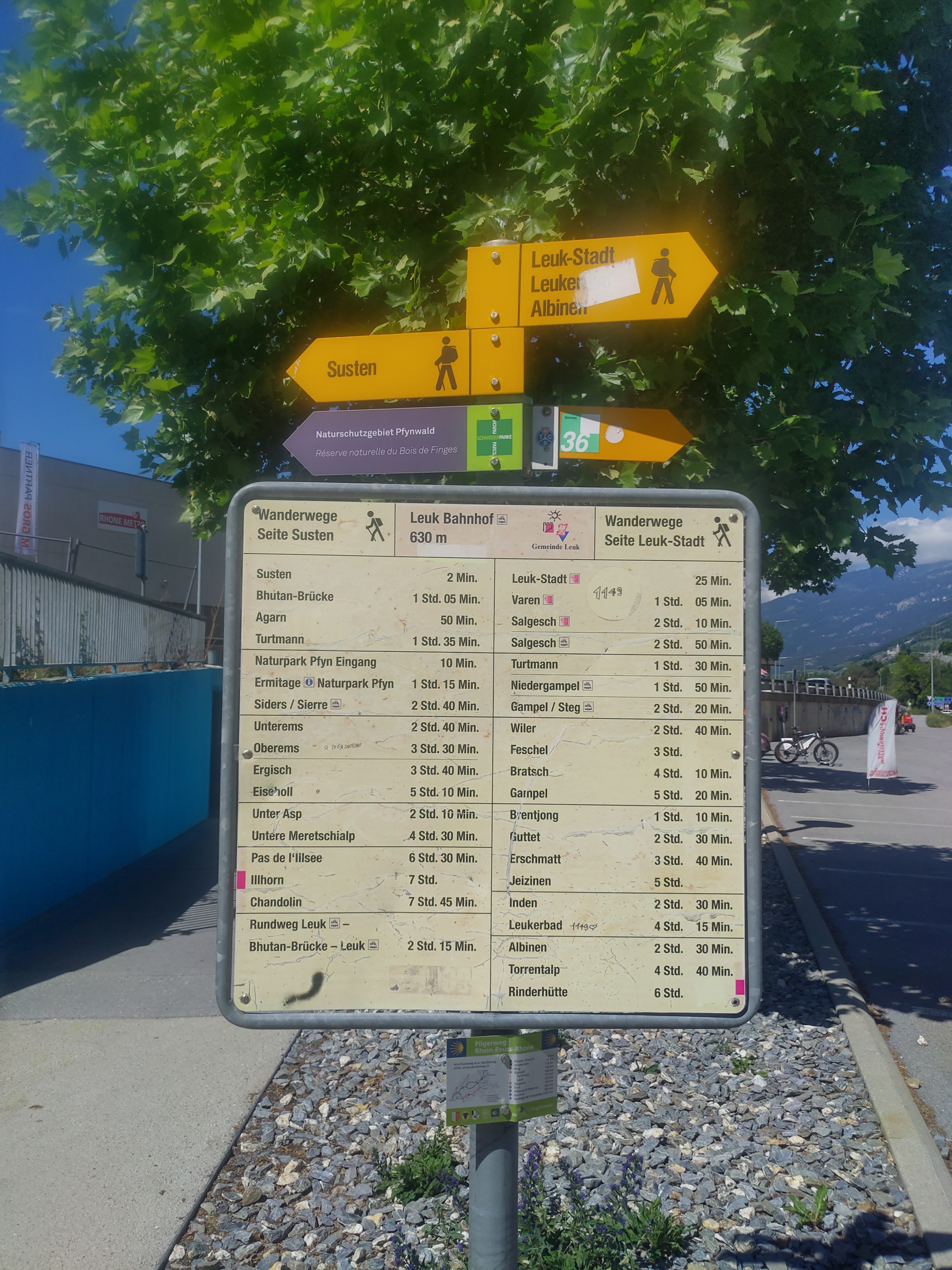
Hiking fingerpost at the station with nearby destinations and times (2022)

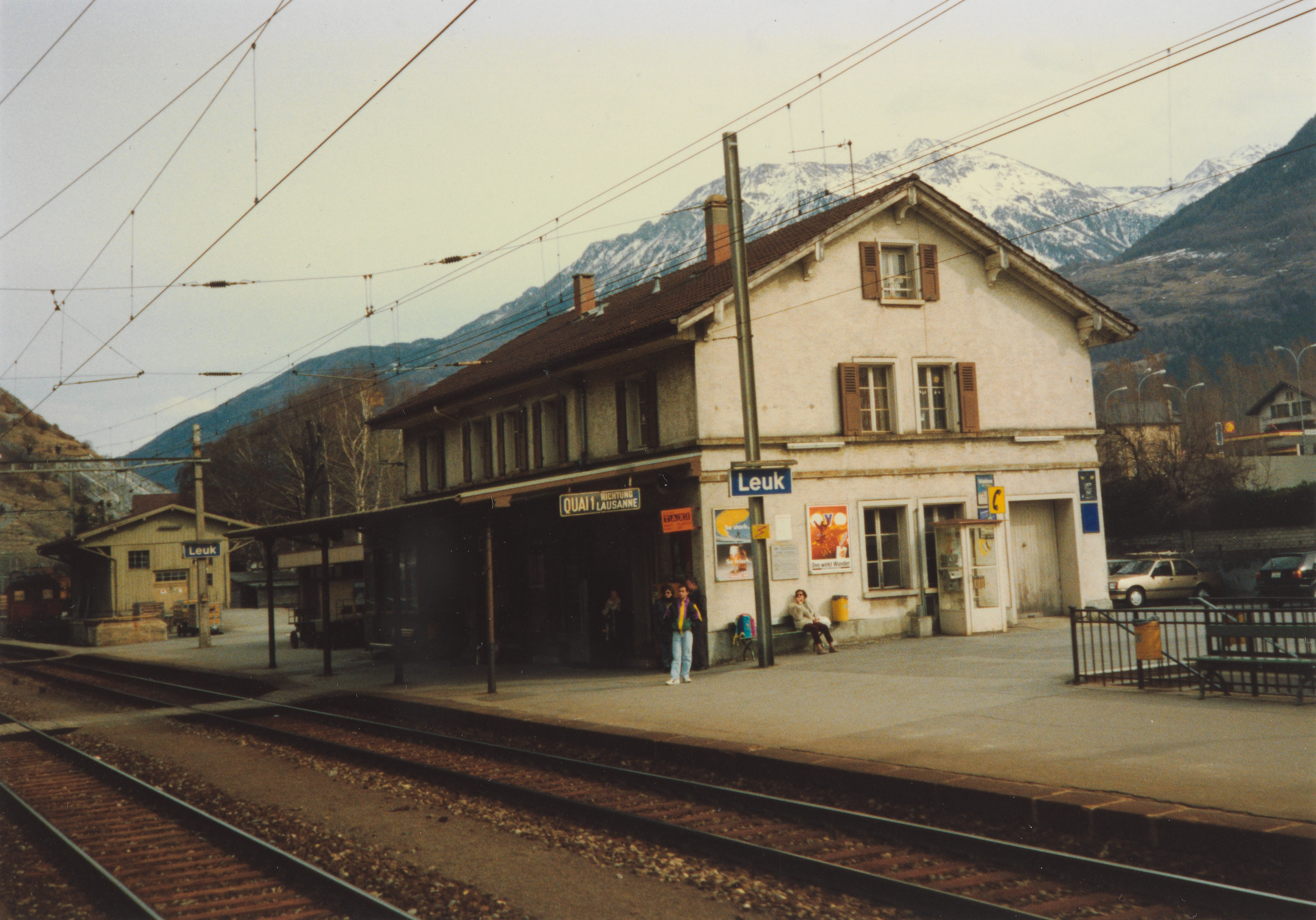
old station building (1992)

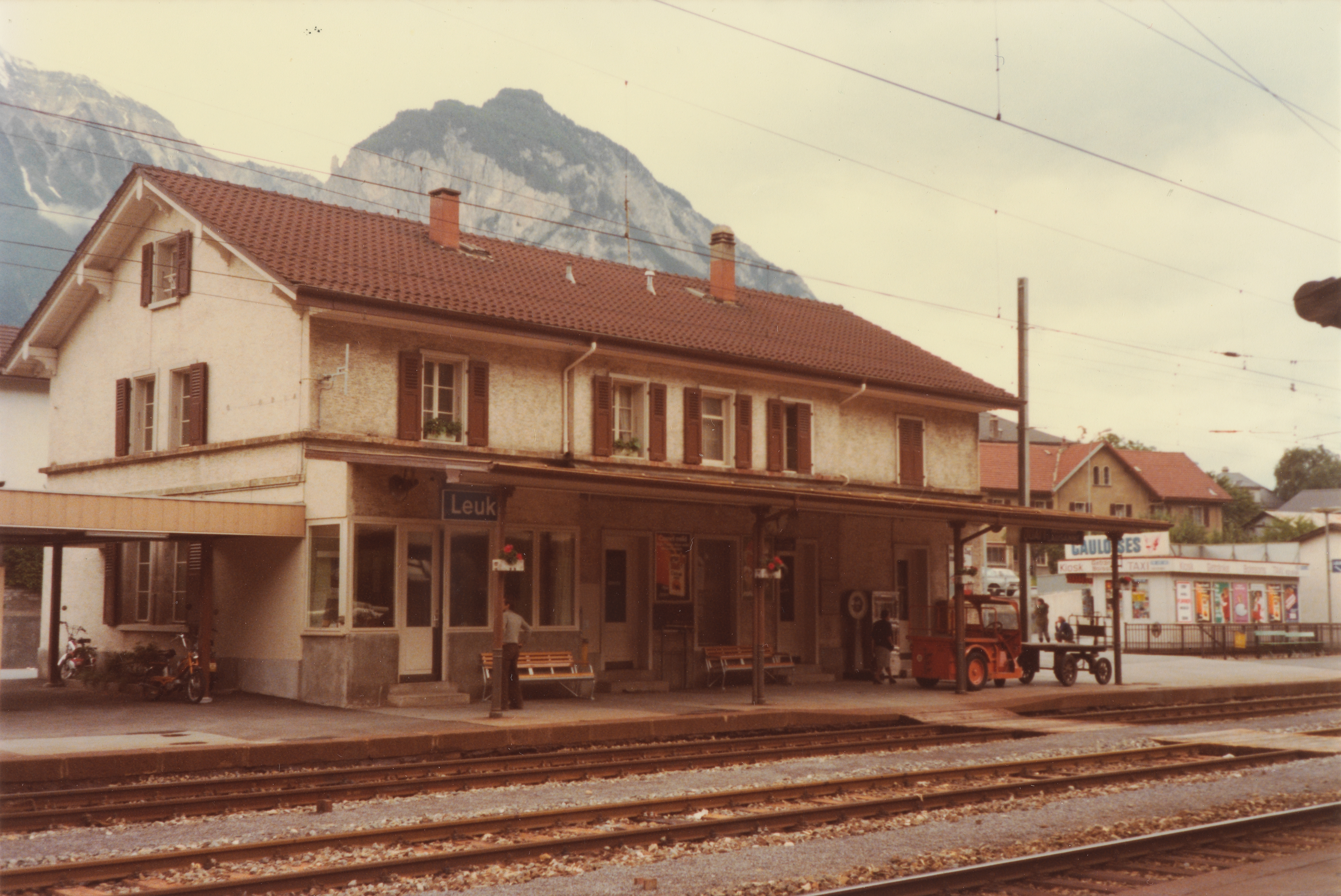
old station building (1980)

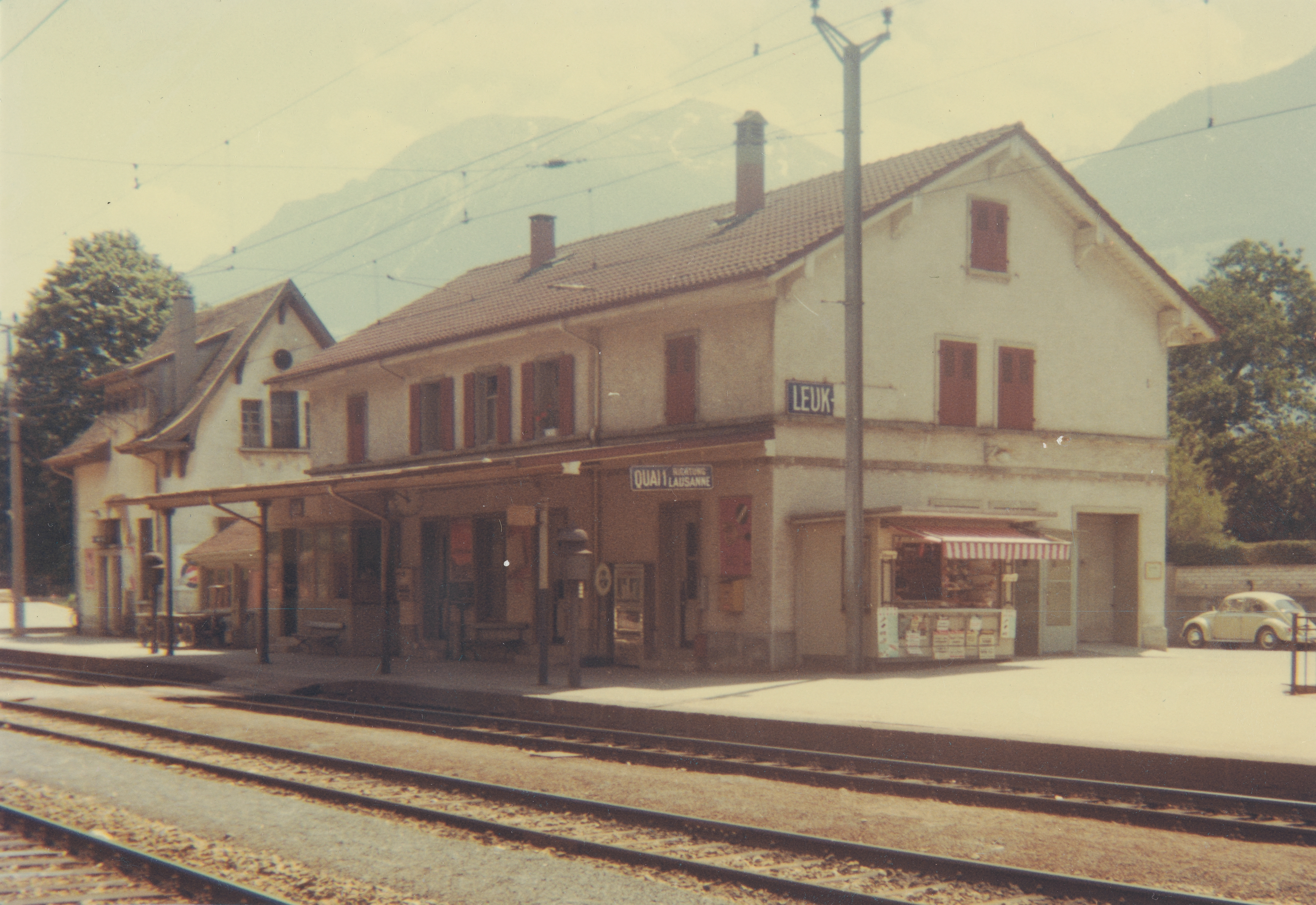
old station building (undated, before 1980)
