= St-Léonard railway station =

Railway station in Saint-Léonard, Switzerland

St-Léonard
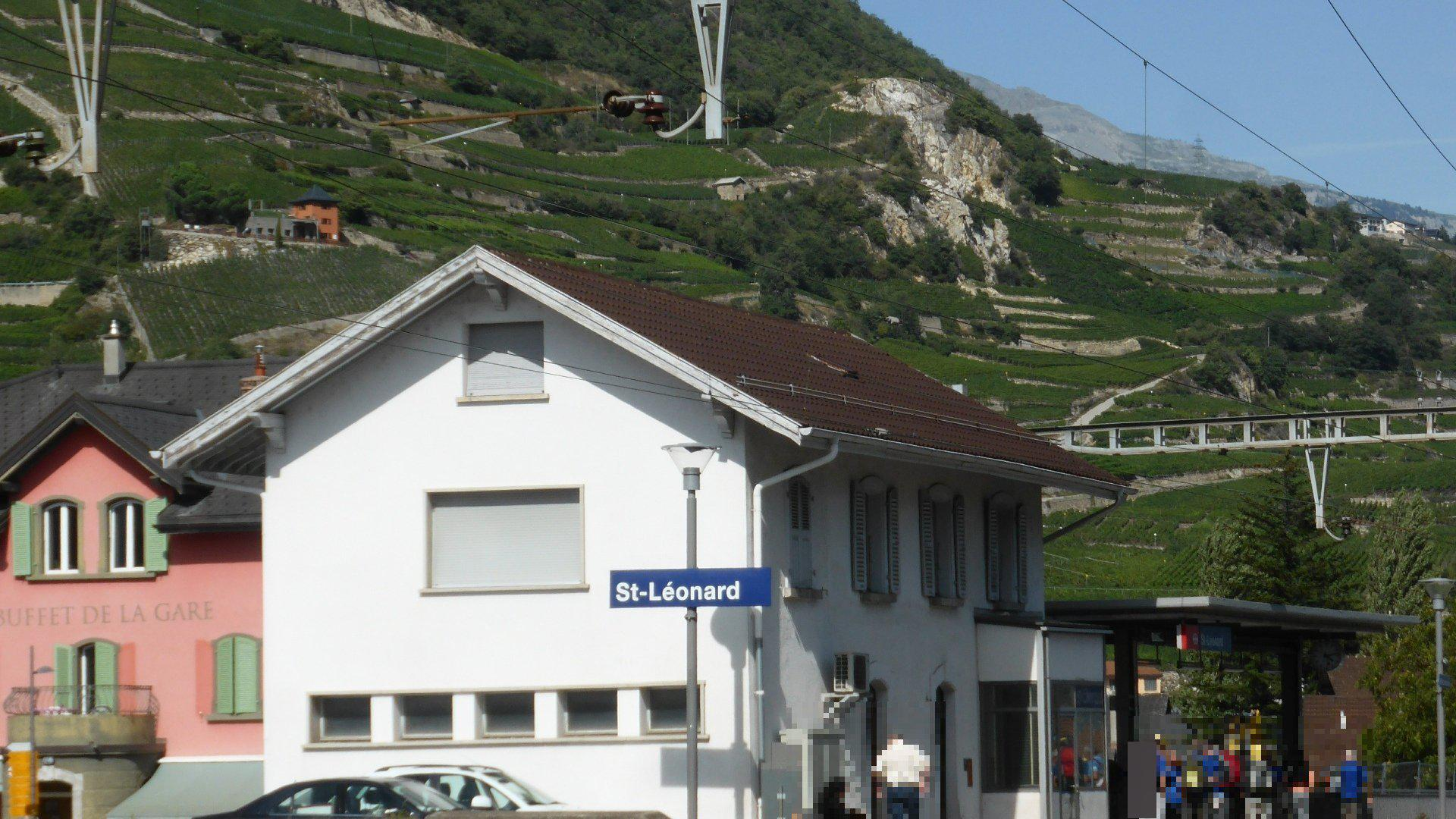
- The station building in 2018

General information
- Location: Saint-Léonard; Switzerland
- Coordinates: 46°15′05″N 7°25′10″E
- Elevation: 504 m (1,654 ft)
- Owner: Swiss Federal Railways
- Line: Simplon line
- Distance: 98.2 km (61.0 mi) from Lausanne
- Platforms: 2 side platforms
- Tracks: 2
- Train operators: RegionAlps

Construction
- Parking: Yes (6 spaces)
- Cycle facilities: Yes
- Accessible: Yes

Other information
- Station code: 8501507 (SL)

Passengers
- 2023: 970 per weekday (RegionAlps)

Services
Preceding station	RegionAlps	Following station
Sion towards St-Gingolph	R91	Sierre/Siders towards Brig
Sion towards Monthey	R91	Sierre/Siders towards Brig
Location

St-Léonard railway station (French: Gare de St-Léonard, German: Bahnhof St-Léonard) is a railway station in the municipality of Saint-Léonard, in the Swiss canton of Valais. It is an intermediate stop on the Simplon line and is served by local trains only.

== Services ==
As of the December 2024 timetable change, the following services stop at St-Léonard:

- Regio: half-hourly service between Monthey and Brig, with every other train continuing from Monthey to St-Gingolph.
