= Sion railway station (Switzerland) =

Railway station in Sion in the canton of Valais, Switzerland

Sion
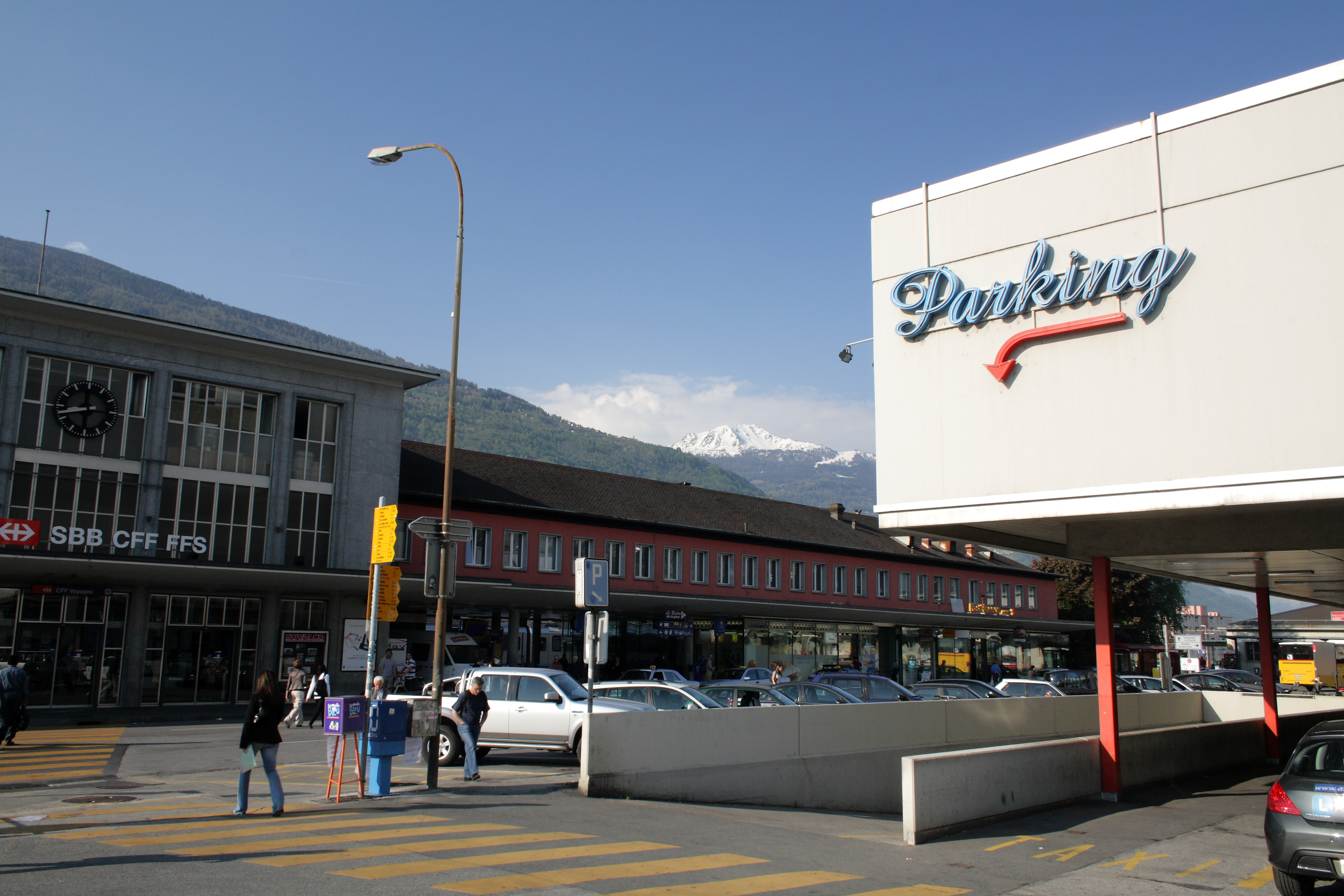
- The station building in 2008

General information
- Location: Sion; Switzerland
- Coordinates: 46°13′39″N 7°21′33″E
- Elevation: 490 m (1,610 ft)
- Owner: Swiss Federal Railways
- Line: Simplon line
- Distance: 92.4 km (57.4 mi) from Lausanne
- Platforms: 3: 1 side platform; 1 island platform
- Tracks: 3
- Train operators: RegionAlps; Swiss Federal Railways
- Connections: CarPostal SA bus lines; Theytaz Excursions bus lines; Bus Sédunois bus lines

Construction
- Parking: Yes (167 spaces)
- Cycle facilities: Yes
- Accessible: Yes

Other information
- Station code: 8501506 (SIO)
- IATA code: ZUF

Passengers
- 2025: 14,300 per day (RegionAlps, SBB)
- Rank: 60 out of 1,095

Services
| Preceding station | SBB CFF FFS | Following station |
|---|---|---|
| Montreux towards Genève-Cornavin | EuroCity | Brig towards Milano Centrale or Venezia Santa Lucia |
| Martigny towards Geneva Airport | IR 90 | Sierre/Siders towards Brig |
| Martigny towards Geneva Airport | IR 95 | Sierre/Siders towards Brig |
| Preceding station | RegionAlps | Following station |
| Châteauneuf-Conthey towards St-Gingolph | R91 | St-Léonard towards Brig |
| Châteauneuf-Conthey towards Monthey | R91 | St-Léonard towards Brig |
Location

Sion railway station (French: Gare de Sion, German: Bahnhof Sitten) is a railway station in the municipality of Sion, in the Swiss canton of Valais. It is an intermediate stop on the Simplon line and is served by local and long-distance trains.

== Services ==
As of the December 2024 timetable change, the following services stop at Sion:

- EuroCity: four trains per day between Genève-Cornavin and Milano Centrale, with one train continuing from Milano Centrale to Venezia Santa Lucia.
- InterRegio: half-hourly service between Geneva Airport and Brig.
- Regio: half-hourly service between Monthey and Brig, with every other train continuing from Monthey to St-Gingolph.

== See also ==
- Rail transport in Switzerland
