= Funiculaire Sierre–Montana–Crans =

Funicular railway to Crans-Montana in Valais, Switzerland

Funiculaire Sierre-Montana-Crans
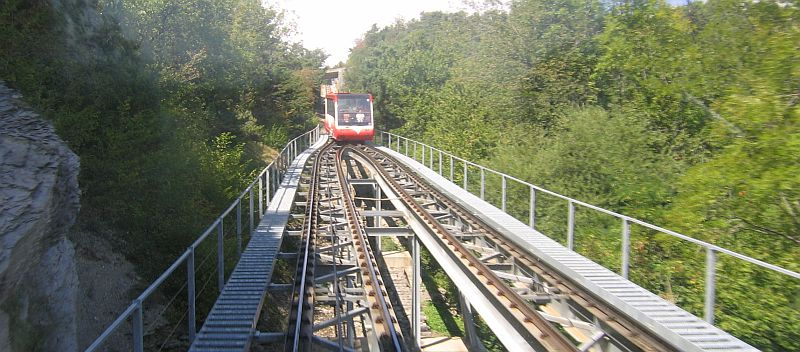
- passing loop (2007)

Overview
- Other name(s): Funiculaire SMC; Sierre-Montana-Crans; Sierre-Montana-Vermala; Funiculaire de Sierre à Montana-Vermala
- Status: In operation
- Owner: Compagnie de Chemin de Fer et d'Autobus Sierre-Montana-Crans, (SMC) SA
- Locale: Valais, Switzerland
- Termini: "Sierre/Siders (funi)" at Rue du Pradec 2; "Montana Gare" at Avenue de la Gare 28
- Connecting lines: Simplon line
- Stations: 4 (8 before 2022)
- Website: cie-smc

Service
- Type: Funicular (before 1997: with 2 sections)
- Route number: 2225
- Operator: SMC
- Rolling stock: 2

History
- Opened: 28 September 1911 (114 years ago)
- Single section: 16 December 1997
- New tracks: 11 December 2022

Technical
- Number of tracks: 1 with passing loop
- Track gauge: Originally 1,000 mm (3 ft 3 3/8 in); 1400 mm since 2022
- Electrification: from opening
- Highest elevation: 1,471 m (4,826 ft)

Funiculaire Sierre–Montana–Crans (abbreviated SMC) is a funicular railway in Valais, Switzerland. The line leads from Sierre at 540 m (1,770 ft) to Crans-Montana at 1,471 m (4,826 ft). The funicular has a single section of about 4.3 km (2.7 mi) since 1997, making it the longest in the world. Earlier, it had two sections with the break at St-Maurice-de-Laques. The funicular with two cars has a single track with a passing loop.

The lower station is located near the Sierre/Siders railway station on the Simplon line. Intermediate stations are at Venthône and Bluche-Randogne.

The funicular was opened in 1911. The line is operated at present by "Compagnie de Chemin de Fer et d’Autobus Sierre-Montana-Crans (SMC) SA".

The funicular was closed from March to December 2022 for new tracks and cars, fewer intermediate stations to allow 20-minute intervals and a journey time of 14 minutes. Concurrently, the power system for the line was redesigned to use solar power to reduce its reliance on grid-provided electricity and for emergency backup power. The system also harvests power regeneratively from the vehicles.
