= Saint-Pierre-de-Clages =

Coordinates: 46°11′N 7°14′E

- Village
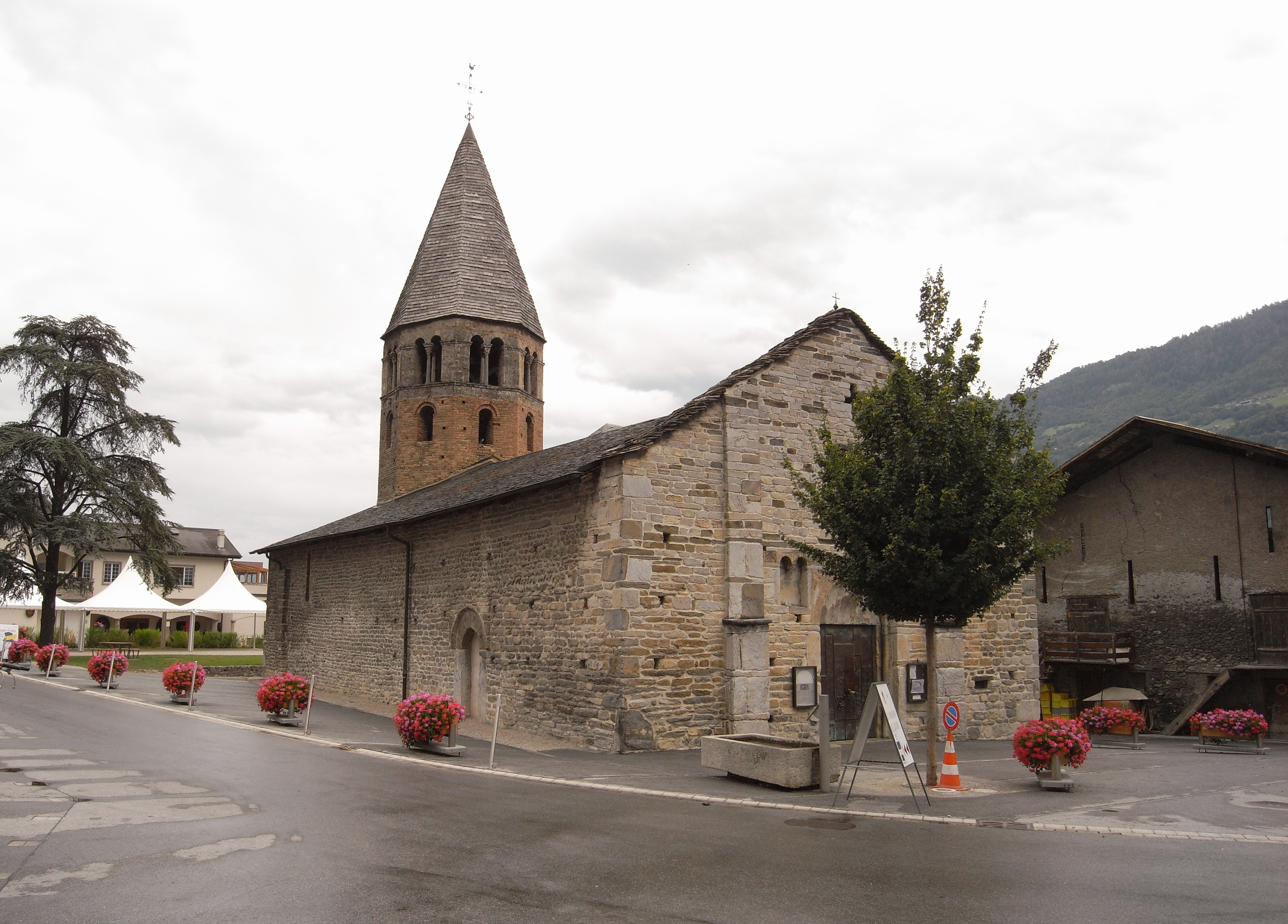
- An image of Saint-Pierre-de-Clages

- Location within Switzerland
- Country: Switzerland
- Canton: Valais
- Municipality: Chamoson
- Joined with Chamoson: 1376

Saint-Pierre-de-Clages is a village in Switzerland. It is located in the French-speaking part of the Canton of Valais in the municipality of Chamoson.

The village of Saint-Pierre-de-Clages was joined with the municipality of Chamoson in 1376. It is famous for its 11th-century church with its octagonal bell tower.

The village of Saint-Pierre-de-Clages is also known as the Swiss book town with an annual book festival.
