= Saint-Gingolph–Saint-Maurice railway =

Railway line in Switzerland

Saint-Gingolph–Saint-Maurice
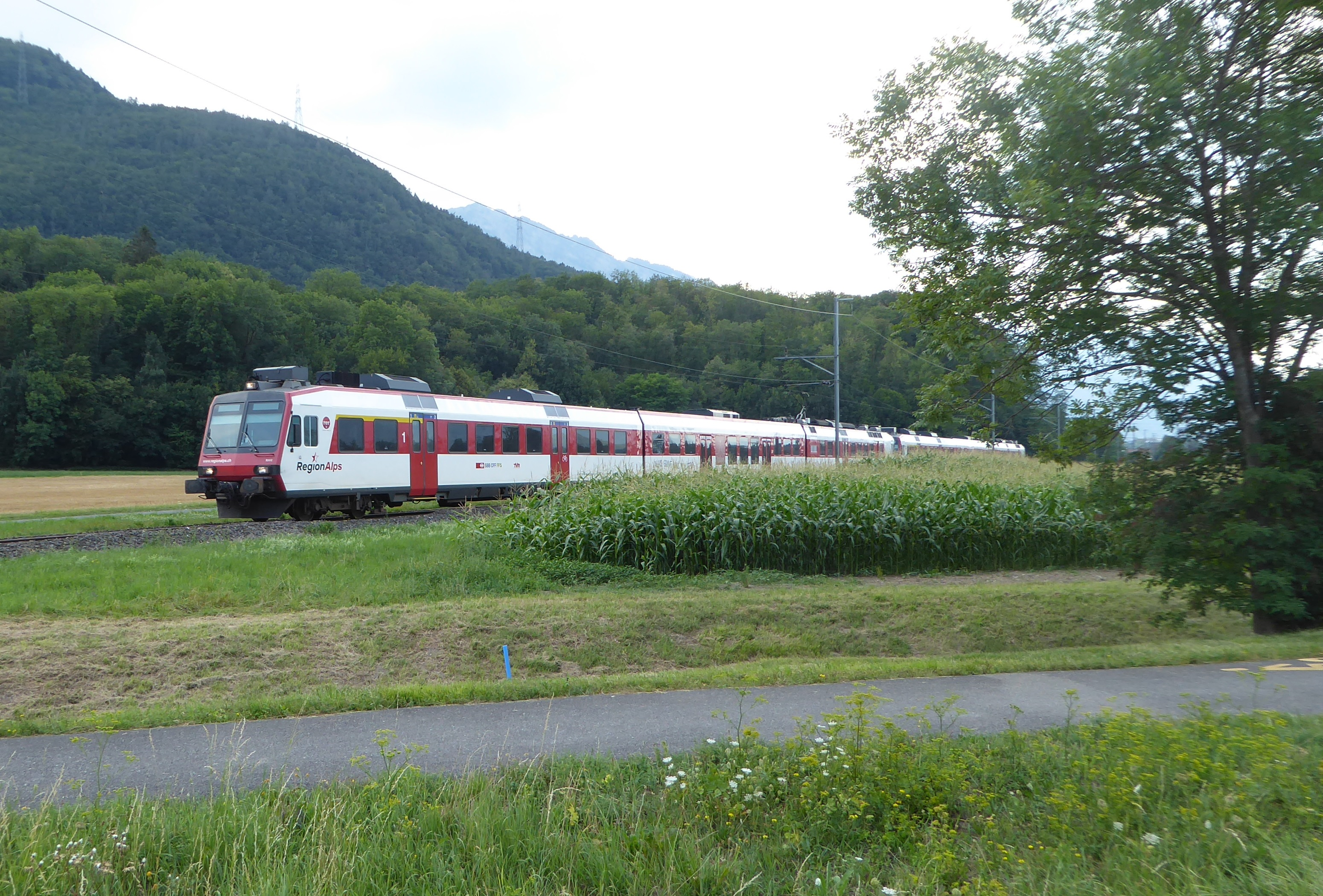
- Domino set between Les Paluds and Massongex

Overview
- Owner: SBB
- Line number: 130
- Termini: Saint-Gingolph; Saint-Maurice

Technical
- Line length: 26.75 km (16.62 mi)
- Number of tracks: 1
- Track gauge: 1,435 mm (4 ft 8 1/2 in) standard gauge
- Electrification: 15 kV/16.7 Hz AC overhead catenary
- Maximum incline: 1.5%

The Saint-Gingolph–Saint-Maurice railway is a single-track railway in Switzerland. It was opened on 14 July 1859 by the Ligne d’Italie. It connects Le Bouveret on Lake Geneva with Saint-Maurice. The line to the French–Swiss border near Saint-Gingolph was opened together with its continuation towards Évian-les-Bains on 1 June 1886. The line together with the French line to Évian is sometimes called the Tonkin Line, because construction workers saw similarities in the geological conditions to Indochina. It was the first railway line in the canton of Valais. A 691 metre-long tunnel had to be built on the approach to Saint-Maurice which is the only major structure of the line (the tunnel was shortened to 490 metres during an upgrade of the Simplon Railway to double track in 1906).

== History ==
As early as 1852, a concession was sought for a line from Villeneuve to Aosta. Among other things, this did not proceed because the canton of Valais required two connecting lines, one between Martigny and Sion and one between Illersaz and Le Bouveret. An application submitted a year later for a line from Le Bouveret to Sion, however, was successful and received a federal concession. The line was planned as an international through route, but never operated in this manner. This was partly because its continuation, the Saint-Gingolph–Évian railway, was opened in 1886 and thus after the opening of the Lausanne–Brig line. The section of the line in France was built by the Compagnie des chemins de fer de Paris à Lyon et à la Méditerranée (PLM). Passenger operations between Évian-les-Bains and Saint-Gingolph were closed in 1937. Freight on the line gained momentum during the Second World War, when it was the only line crossing into Switzerland that was not directly under the control of the Axis powers. Then it returned to insignificance, so that in 1988 all traffic ended on the French side. Since then, traffic has only run towards Saint-Maurice. The line between Saint-Maurice and Collombey was electrified in 1946 and the rest of the line to Saint-Gingolph in 1954.

== Operations ==
Passenger traffic is limited to hourly regional trains operated by RegionAlps. These have increased in frequency, after it was one of the few lines in Switzerland where services had been reduced to a two-hour frequency in the 1990s. The regional services now continue beyond Saint-Maurice to Brig.

Various sidings in Monthey and Collombey serve daily freight traffic towards Saint-Maurice. In addition to the sidings (Losinger, Givo., CABV, AGIP), only Monthey station is open on the basic network for single wagonload traffic. Although Bouveret is still open as an operating point for freight traffic, it is currently used very rarely. Therefore, there is no daily freight traffic between Saint-Gingolph and Monthey.
