= Monthey railway station =

Railway station in Monthey, Switzerland

Monthey
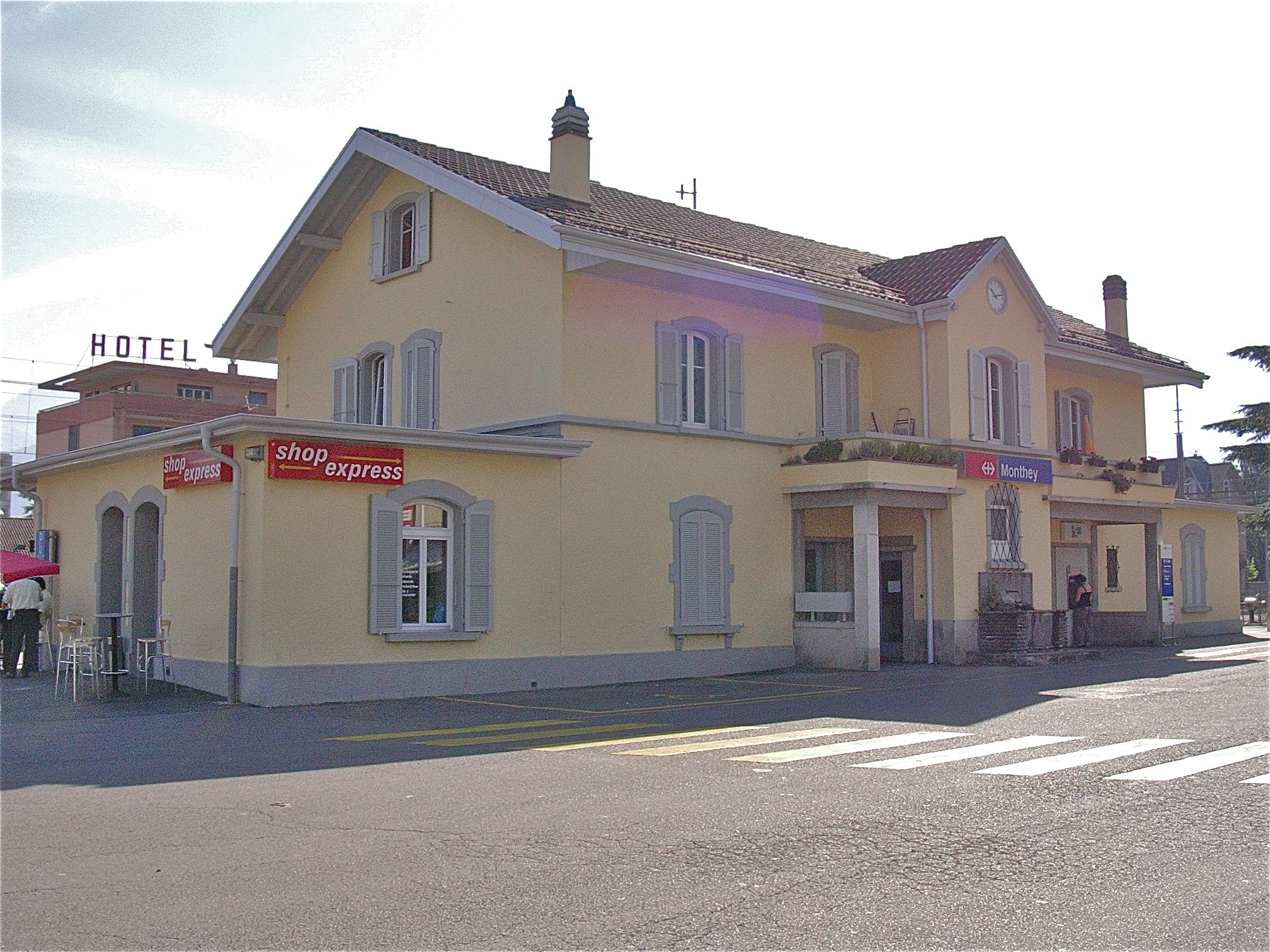
- The station building in 2013

General information
- Location: Monthey; Switzerland
- Coordinates: 46°15′22″N 6°57′18″E
- Elevation: 406 m (1,332 ft)
- Owner: Swiss Federal Railways
- Line: Saint-Gingolph–Saint-Maurice line
- Distance: 6.1 km (3.8 mi) from St-Maurice
- Platforms: 2; 1 side platform; 1 island platform
- Tracks: 2
- Train operators: RegionAlps
- Connections: CarPostal SA buses; Transports Publics du Chablais buses

Construction
- Parking: Yes (31 spaces)
- Cycle facilities: Yes (17 spaces)
- Accessible: Partly

Other information
- Station code: 8501421 (MTH)
- Fare zone: 83 (mobilis)

Passengers
- 2023: 2'900 per weekday (RegionAlps)

Services
Preceding station	RegionAlps	Following station
Collombey towards St-Gingolph	R91	Massongex towards Brig
Terminus	R91	Massongex towards Brig
Location

Monthey railway station (French: Gare de Monthey, German: Bahnhof Monthey) is a railway station in the municipality of Monthey, in the Swiss canton of Valais. It is an intermediate stop on the Saint-Gingolph–Saint-Maurice line and is served by local trains only.

Monthey is one of four stations located in the municipality; the other three are on the 1,000 mm (3 ft 3 3/8 in) Aigle–Ollon–Monthey–Champéry line. The nearest of these is Monthey-Ville, is 700 metres (2,300 ft) to the west.

== Services ==
As of the December 2024 timetable change, the following services stop at Monthey:

- Regio: half-hourly service to Brig and hourly service to St-Gingolph.
