= St-Gingolph railway station =

Railway station in Saint-Gingolph, Switzerland

St-Gingolph
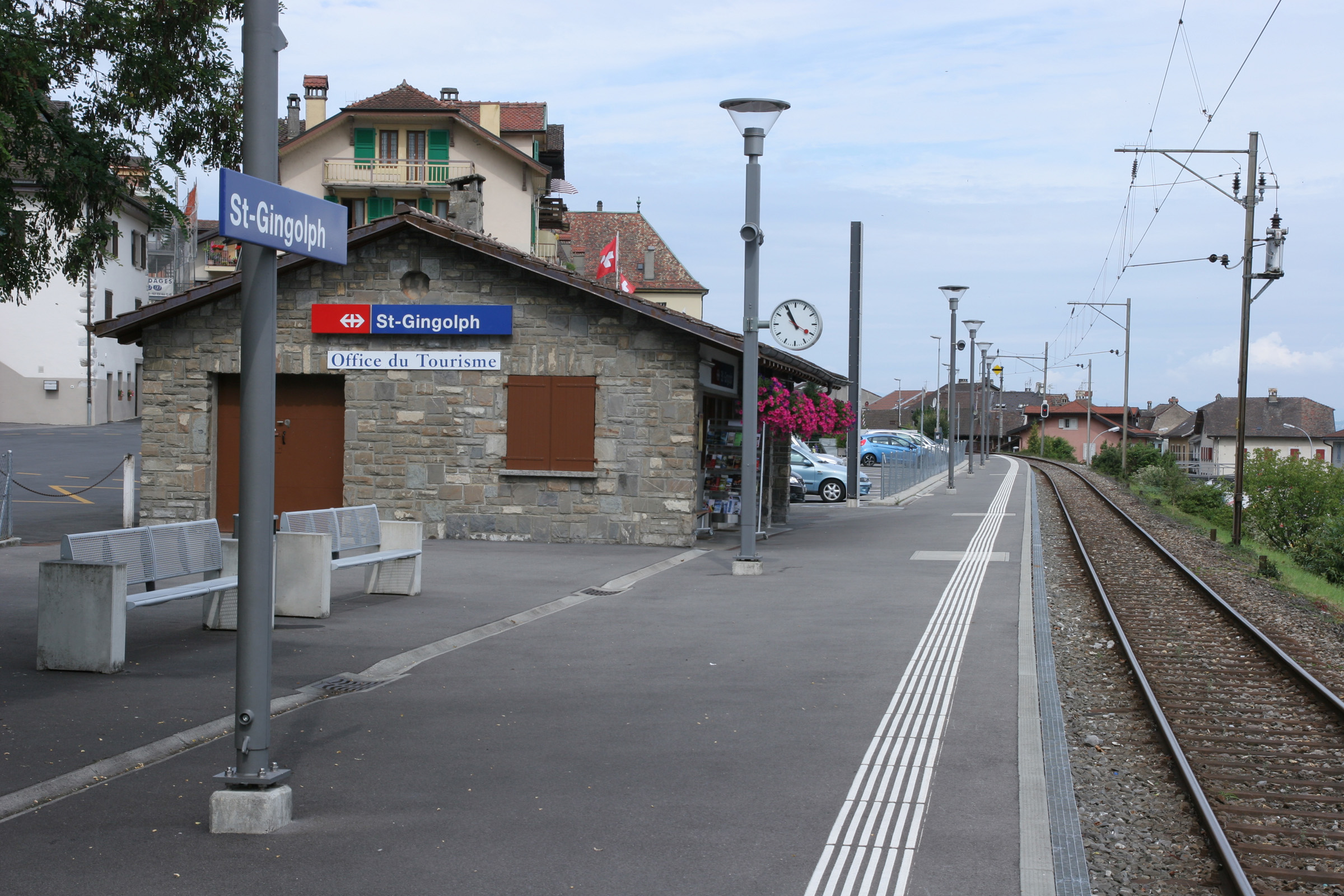
- The station building in 2011

General information
- Location: Saint-Gingolph; Switzerland
- Coordinates: 46°23′32″N 6°48′22″E
- Elevation: 390 m (1,280 ft)
- Owner: Swiss Federal Railways
- Line: Saint-Gingolph–Saint-Maurice line
- Distance: 26.8 km (16.7 mi) from St-Maurice
- Platforms: 1 side platform
- Tracks: 1
- Train operators: RegionAlps
- Connections: EVAD bus line; CGN ferries

Construction
- Accessible: Partly

Other information
- Station code: 8501428 (STGI)

Passengers
- 2023: 510 per weekday (RegionAlps)

Services
Preceding station	RegionAlps	Following station
Terminus	R91	Bouveret towards Brig
Location

St-Gingolph railway station (French: Gare de St-Gingolph, German: Bahnhof St-Gingolph) is a railway station in the municipality of Saint-Gingolph, in the Swiss canton of Valais. It is the northern terminus of the Saint-Gingolph–Saint-Maurice line and is served by local trains only. The station sits on the border between Switzerland and France; there is no rail service on the French side.

== Services ==
As of the December 2024 timetable change, the following services stop at St-Gingolph:

- Regio: hourly service to Brig.
