= Vernayaz MC railway station =

Railway station in Vernayaz, Switzerland

Vernayaz MC
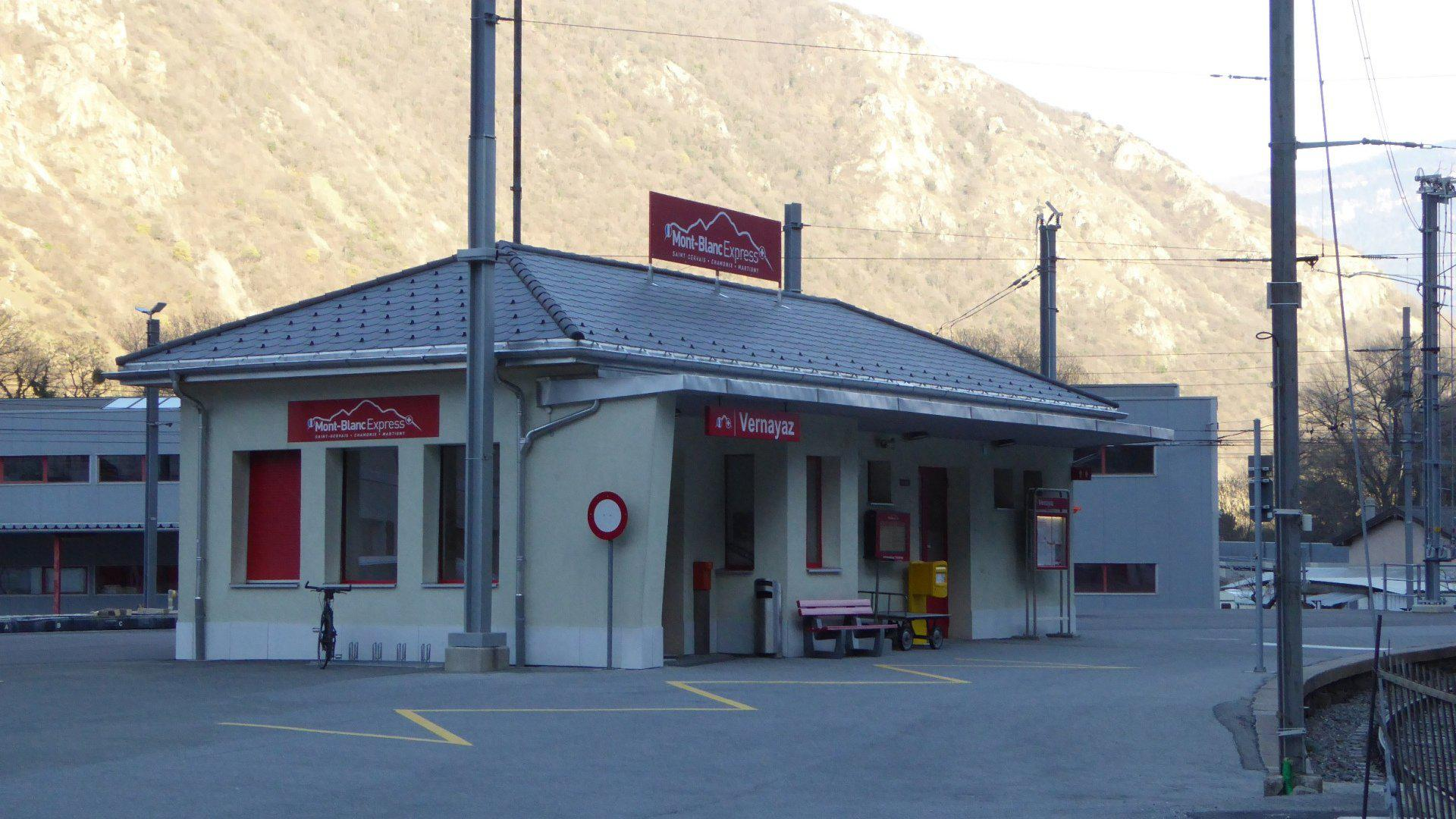
- The station shelter in 2019

General information
- Location: Vernayaz; Switzerland
- Coordinates: 46°07′49″N 7°02′41″E
- Elevation: 457 m (1,499 ft)
- Owner: Transports de Martigny et Régions
- Line: Martigny–Châtelard line
- Distance: 4.0 km (2.5 mi) from Martigny
- Platforms: 2 side platforms
- Tracks: 2
- Train operators: Transports de Martigny et Régions

Construction
- Accessible: No

Other information
- Station code: 8501561 (VEMC)

Services
Preceding station	Transports de Martigny et Régions	Following station
Salvan towards Vallorcine	Regio Mont-Blanc Express	Les Fumeaux towards Martigny
Location

Vernayaz MC railway station (French: Gare de Vernayaz MC) is a railway station in the municipality of Vernayaz, in the Swiss canton of Valais. It is located on the 1,000 mm (3 ft 3 3/8 in) gauge Martigny–Châtelard line of Transports de Martigny et Régions. The depot for the line is located just south of the entrance to the station. Another station, Vernayaz on the standard gauge Simplon line of Swiss Federal Railways, is located roughly 1.1 kilometres (0.68 mi) to the north, across the Trient river. There is no local transport connection.

== Services ==
As of the December 2023 timetable change, the following services stop at Vernayaz MC:

- Regio Mont-Blanc Express: hourly service between Martigny and Vallorcine.
