= Le Châtelard VS railway station =

Railway station in Finhaut, Switzerland

Le Châtelard VS
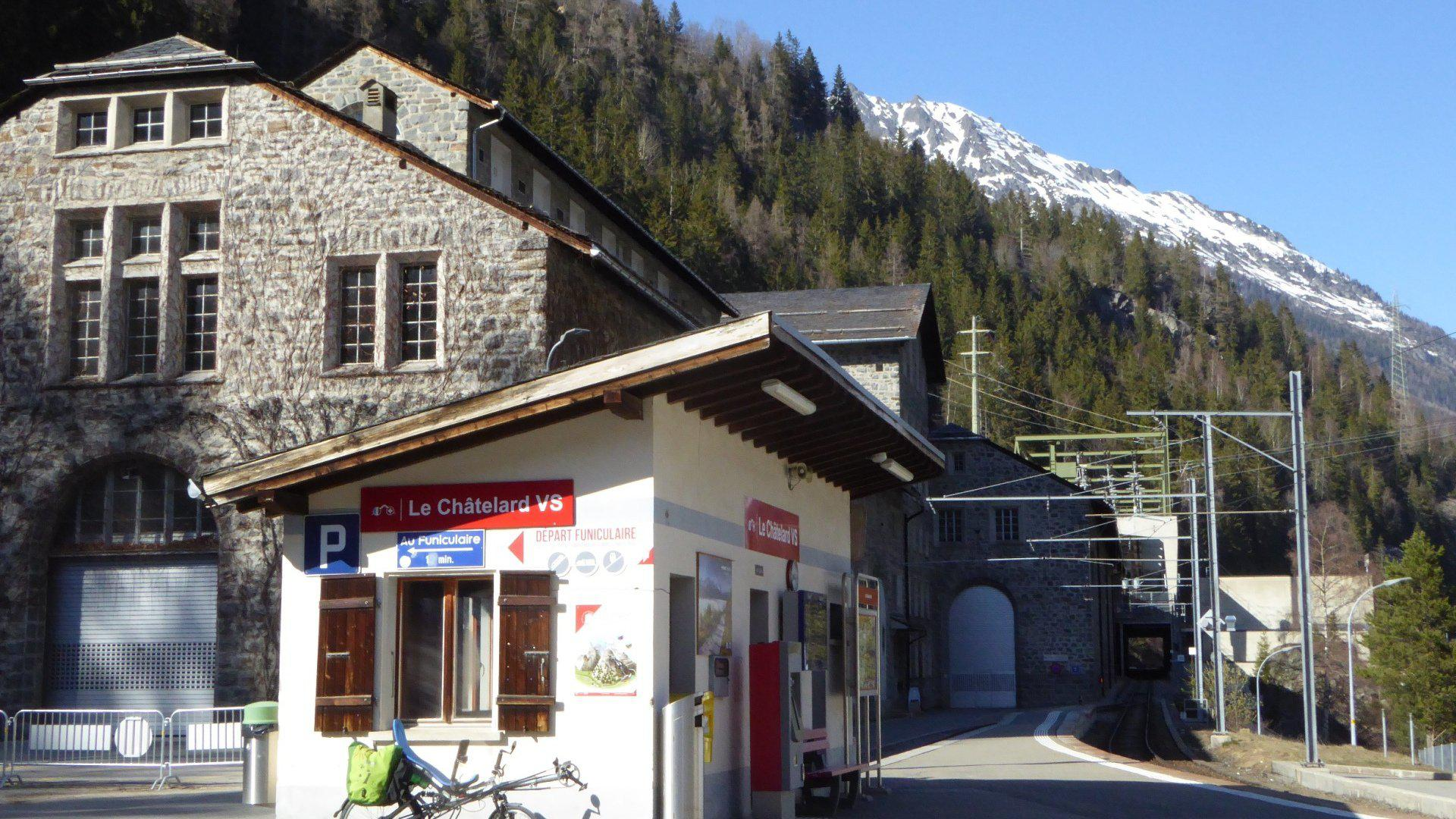
- The station in 2019

General information
- Location: Finhaut; Switzerland
- Coordinates: 46°03′37″N 6°57′29″E
- Elevation: 1,125 m (3,691 ft)
- Owner: Transports de Martigny et Régions
- Line: Martigny–Châtelard line
- Distance: 17.0 km (10.6 mi) from Martigny
- Platforms: 1 side platform
- Tracks: 1
- Train operators: Transports de Martigny et Régions
- Connections: Funiculaire du Châtelard

Construction
- Accessible: No

Other information
- Station code: 8501566 (CHGI)

Services
Preceding station	Transports de Martigny et Régions	Following station
Le Châtelard-Frontière towards Vallorcine	Regio Mont-Blanc Express	Finhaut towards Martigny
Location

Le Châtelard VS railway station (French: Gare de Le Châtelard VS) is a railway station in the municipality of Finhaut, in the Swiss canton of Valais. It is an intermediate stop and a request stop on the 1,000 mm (3 ft 3 3/8 in) metre gauge Martigny–Châtelard line of Transports de Martigny et Régions. The station is adjacent to the valley station of the Funiculaire du Châtelard to Lac d'Émosson.

== Services ==
As of the December 2023 timetable change, the following services stop at Le Châtelard VS:

- Regio Mont-Blanc Express: hourly service between Martigny and Vallorcine.
