= Salvan railway station =

Railway station in Salvan, Switzerland

Salvan
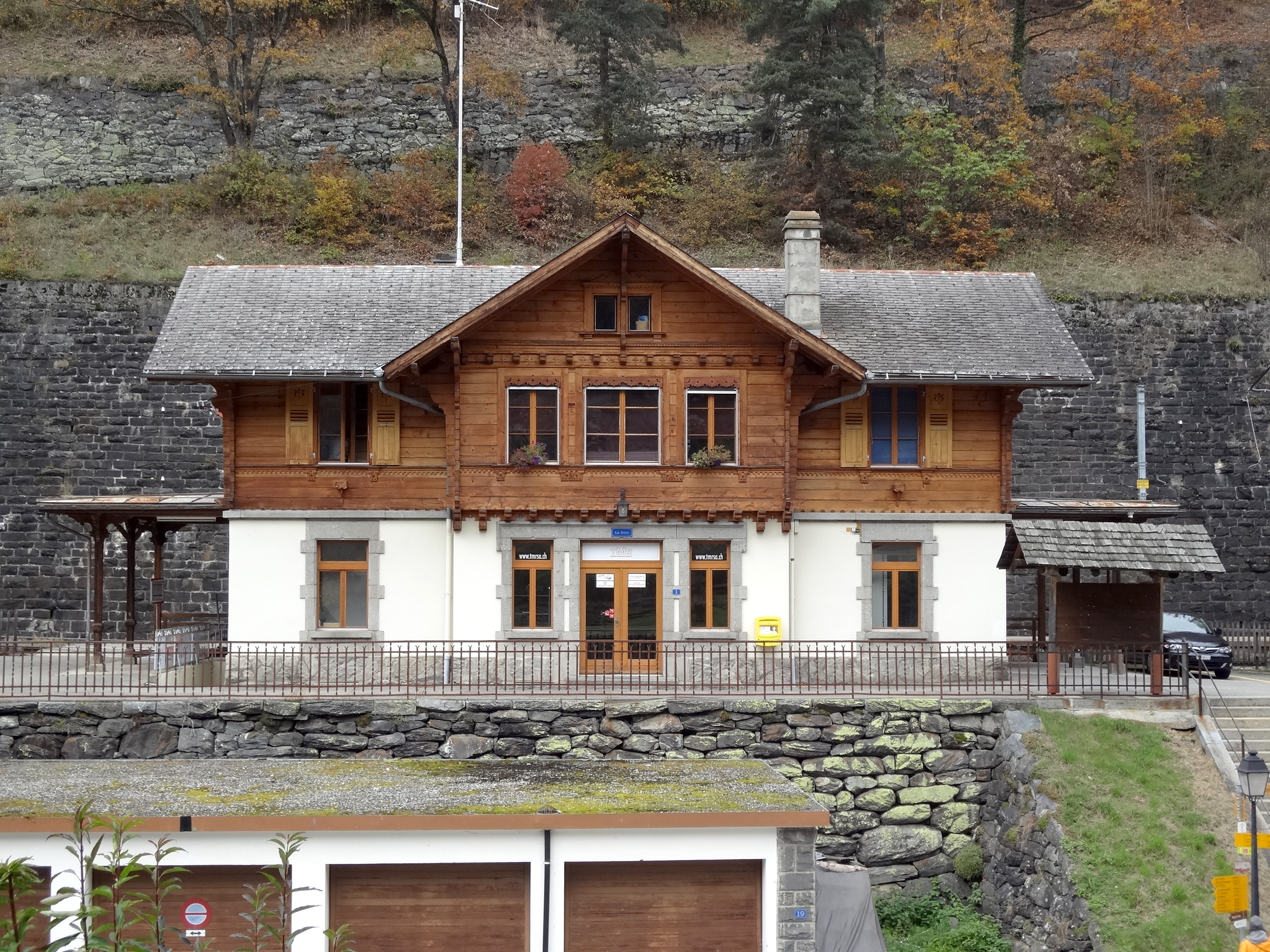
- The station building in 2015

General information
- Location: Salvan; Switzerland
- Coordinates: 46°07′18″N 7°01′16″E
- Elevation: 933 m (3,061 ft)
- Owner: Transports de Martigny et Régions
- Line: Martigny–Châtelard line
- Distance: 7.4 km (4.6 mi) from Martigny
- Platforms: 2 (1 island platform)
- Tracks: 2
- Train operators: Transports de Martigny et Régions

Construction
- Accessible: No

Other information
- Station code: 8501562 (SLV)

Services
Preceding station	Transports de Martigny et Régions	Following station
Les Marécottes towards Vallorcine	Regio Mont-Blanc Express	Vernayaz MC towards Martigny
Location

Salvan railway station (French: Gare de Salvan) is a railway station in the municipality of Salvan, in the Swiss canton of Valais. It is located on the 1,000 mm (3 ft 3 3/8 in) gauge Martigny–Châtelard line of Transports de Martigny et Régions.

== Services ==
As of the December 2023 timetable change, the following services stop at Salvan:

- Regio Mont-Blanc Express: hourly service between Martigny and Vallorcine.
