= Les Marécottes railway station =

Railway station in Salvan, Switzerland

Les Marécottes
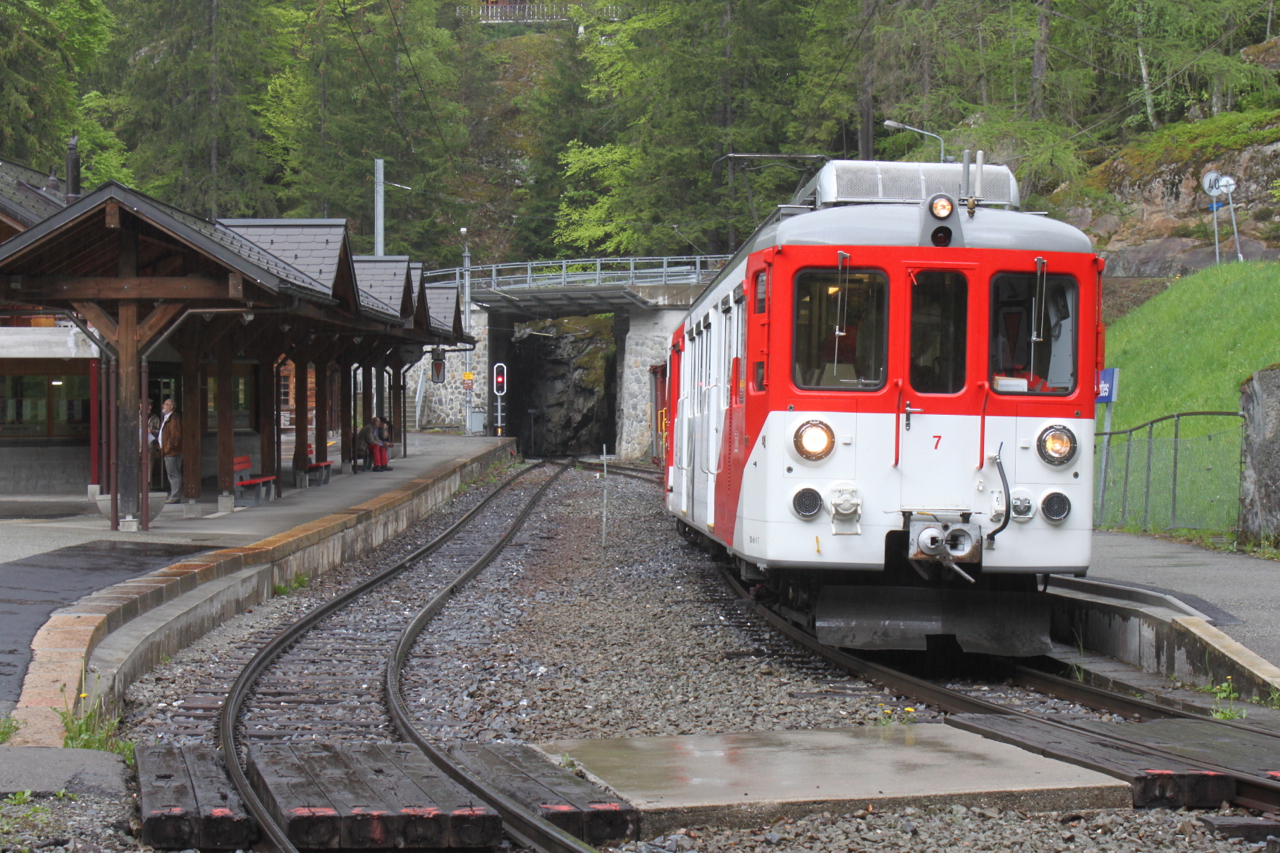
- A Transports de Martigny et Régions train at the station in 2012

General information
- Location: Salvan; Switzerland
- Coordinates: 46°06′44″N 7°00′42″E
- Elevation: 1,029 m (3,376 ft)
- Owner: Transports de Martigny et Régions
- Line: Martigny–Châtelard line
- Distance: 8.9 km (5.5 mi) from Martigny
- Platforms: 2 side platforms
- Tracks: 2
- Train operators: Transports de Martigny et Régions
- Connections: TMR bus line

Construction
- Accessible: Partly

Other information
- Station code: 8501563 (MARE)

Services
Preceding station	Transports de Martigny et Régions	Following station
La Médettaz towards Vallorcine	Regio Mont-Blanc Express	Salvan towards Martigny
Location

Les Marécottes railway station (French: Gare des Marécottes) is a railway station in the municipality of Salvan, in the Swiss canton of Valais. It is located on the 1,000 mm (3 ft 3 3/8 in) gauge Martigny–Châtelard line of Transports de Martigny et Régions.

== Services ==
As of the December 2023 timetable change, the following services stop at Les Marécottes:

- Regio Mont-Blanc Express: hourly service between Martigny and Vallorcine.
