= Trient =

Trient may refer to:

- Trient, Switzerland, a hamlet of around 150 people in Valais, Switzerland
- Trient Glacier, a glacier on Mont Blanc, Switzerland
- Trient (river), Switzerland
- the historic and German name for the city of Trento in Italy
