= Finhaut railway station =

Railway station in Finhaut, Switzerland

Finhaut
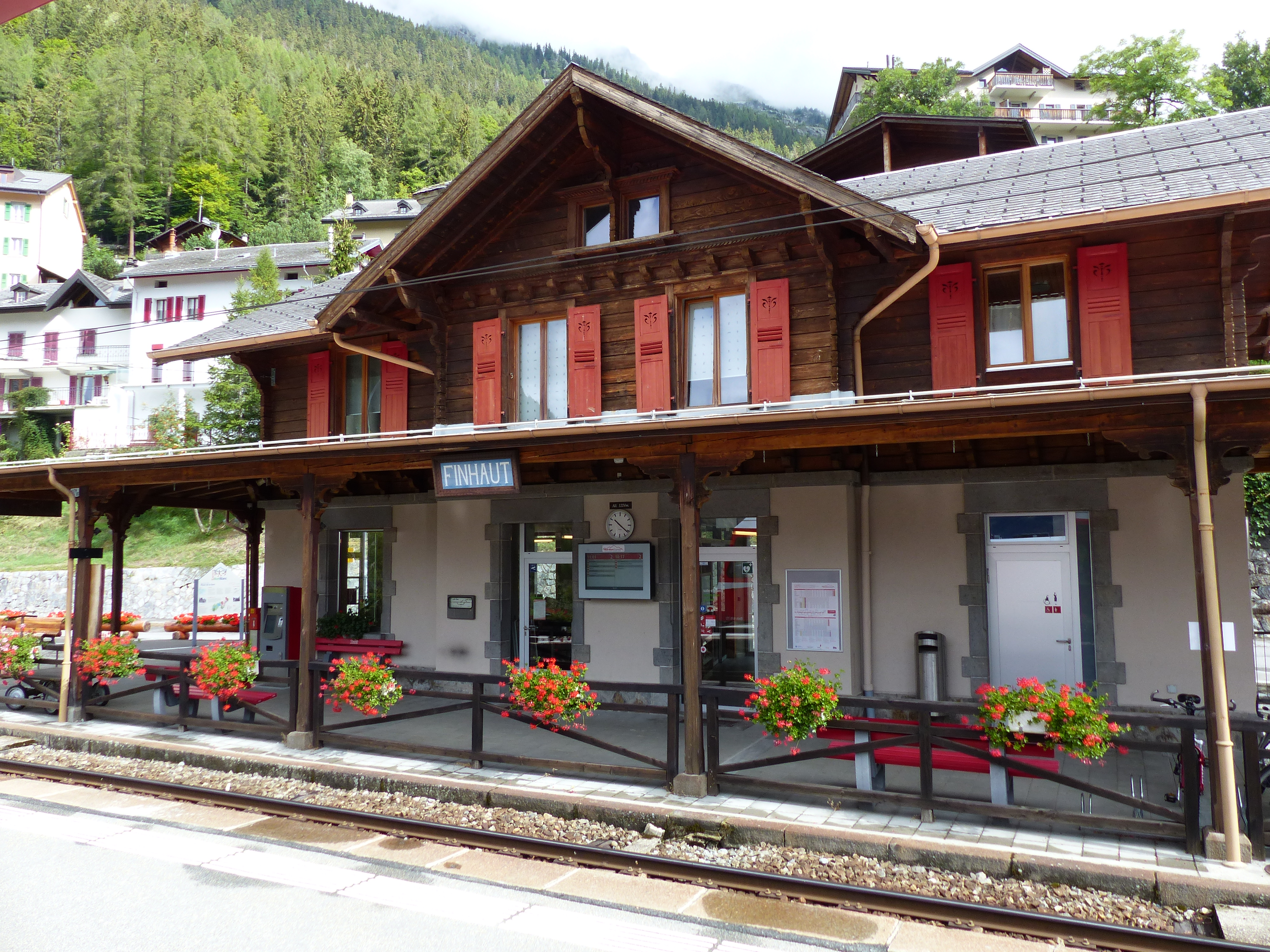
- The station building in 2018

General information
- Location: Finhaut; Switzerland
- Coordinates: 46°04′57″N 6°58′34″E
- Elevation: 1,224 m (4,016 ft)
- Owner: Transports de Martigny et Régions
- Line: Martigny–Châtelard line
- Distance: 14.0 km (8.7 mi) from Martigny
- Platforms: 2 (1 island platform)
- Tracks: 2
- Train operators: Transports de Martigny et Régions
- Connections: TMR bus line

Construction
- Accessible: Partly

Other information
- Station code: 8501565 (FIN)

Services
Preceding station	Transports de Martigny et Régions	Following station
Le Châtelard VS towards Vallorcine	Regio Mont-Blanc Express	Le Trétien towards Martigny
Location

Finhaut railway station (French: Gare de Finhaut) is a railway station in the municipality of Finhaut, in the Swiss canton of Valais. It is located on the 1,000 mm (3 ft 3 3/8 in) gauge Martigny–Châtelard line of Transports de Martigny et Régions.

== Services ==
As of the December 2023 timetable change, the following services stop at Finhaut:

- Regio Mont-Blanc Express: hourly service between Martigny and Vallorcine.

== See also ==
- List of highest railway stations in Switzerland
