= La Médettaz railway station =

Railway station in Salvan, Switzerland

La Médettaz
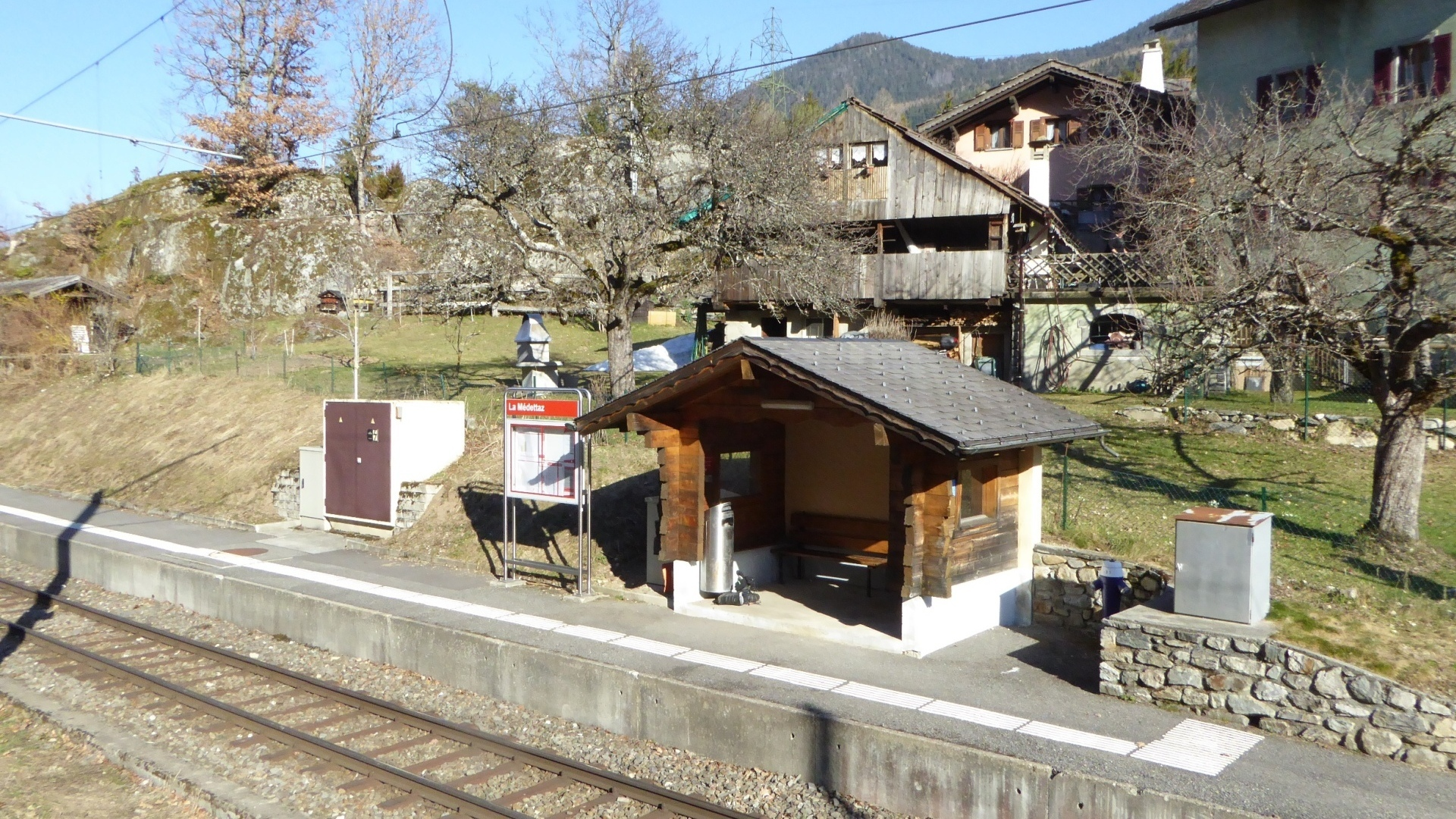
- The station platform in 2019

General information
- Location: Salvan; Switzerland
- Coordinates: 46°06′32″N 7°00′28″E
- Elevation: 1,040 m (3,410 ft)
- Owner: Transports de Martigny et Régions
- Line: Martigny–Châtelard line
- Distance: 9.4 km (5.8 mi) from Martigny
- Platforms: 1 side platform
- Tracks: 1
- Train operators: Transports de Martigny et Régions

Construction
- Accessible: Yes

Other information
- Station code: 8530334 (MED)

Services
| Preceding station | Transports de Martigny et Régions | Following station |
|---|---|---|
| Le Trétien towards Vallorcine | Regio Mont-Blanc Express | Les Marécottes towards Martigny |
Location

La Médettaz railway station (French: Gare de La Médettaz) is a railway station in the municipality of Salvan, in the Swiss canton of Valais. It is an intermediate stop and a request stop on the 1,000 mm (3 ft 3 3/8 in) metre gauge Martigny–Châtelard line of Transports de Martigny et Régions.

== Services ==
As of the December 2023 timetable change, the following services stop at La Médettaz:

- Regio Mont-Blanc Express: hourly service between Martigny and Vallorcine.
