= Le Trétien railway station =

Railway station in Salvan, Switzerland

Le Trétien
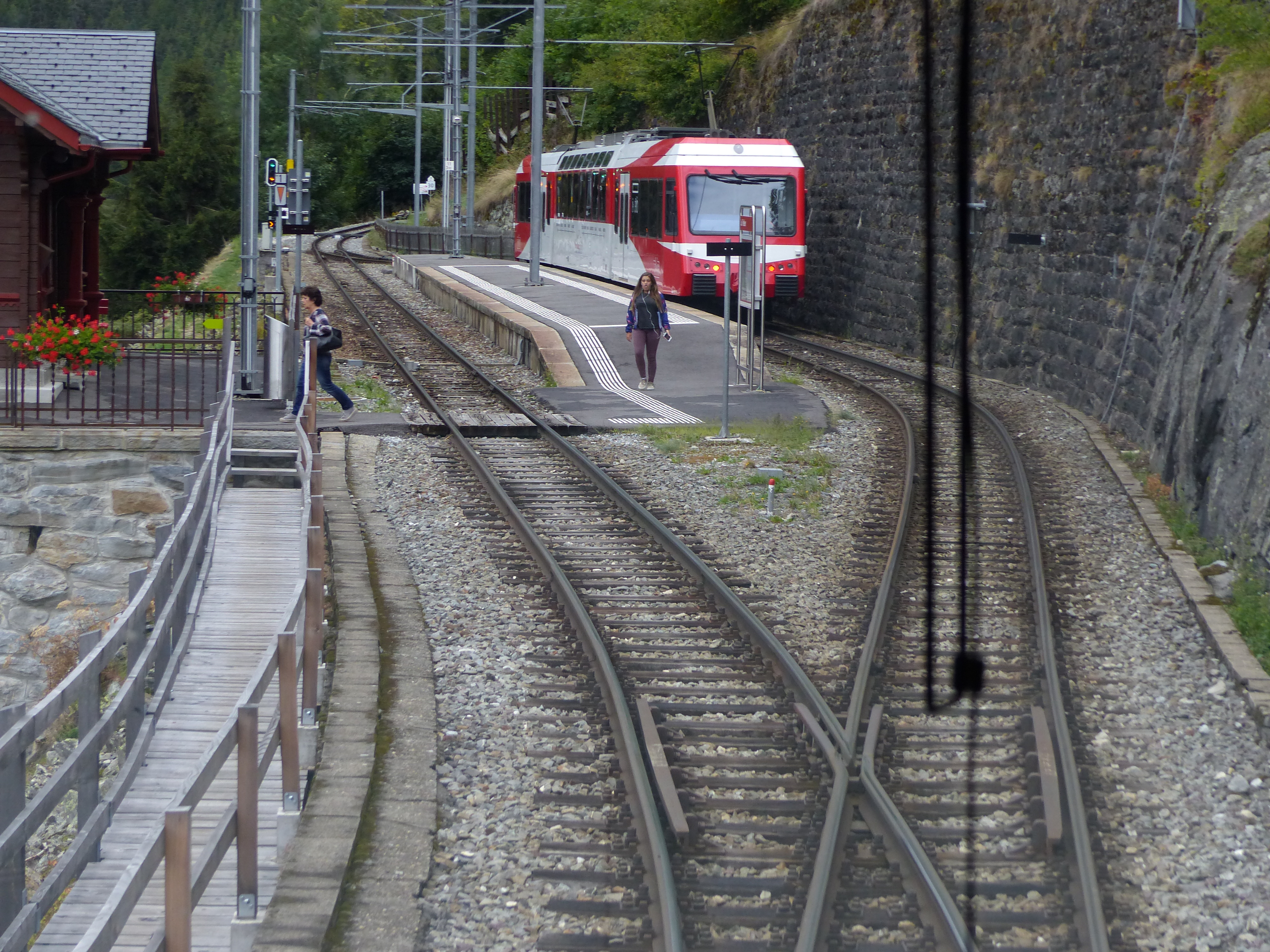
- A Transports de Martigny et Régions train at the station in 2018

General information
- Location: Salvan; Switzerland
- Coordinates: 46°06′08″N 6°59′52″E
- Elevation: 1,060 m (3,480 ft)
- Owner: Transports de Martigny et Régions
- Line: Martigny–Châtelard line
- Distance: 10.6 km (6.6 mi) from Martigny
- Platforms: 2 (1 island platform)
- Tracks: 2
- Train operators: Transports de Martigny et Régions

Construction
- Accessible: No

Other information
- Station code: 8501564 (TRET)

Services
Preceding station	Transports de Martigny et Régions	Following station
Finhaut towards Vallorcine	Regio Mont-Blanc Express	La Médettaz towards Martigny
Location

Le Trétien railway station (French: Gare de Le Trétien) is a railway station in the municipality of Salvan, in the Swiss canton of Valais. It is an intermediate stop and a request stop on the 1,000 mm (3 ft 3 3/8 in) metre gauge Martigny–Châtelard line of Transports de Martigny et Régions.

== Services ==
As of the December 2023 timetable change, the following services stop at Le Trétien:

- Regio Mont-Blanc Express: hourly service between Martigny and Vallorcine.
