= Vernayaz =

- Municipality
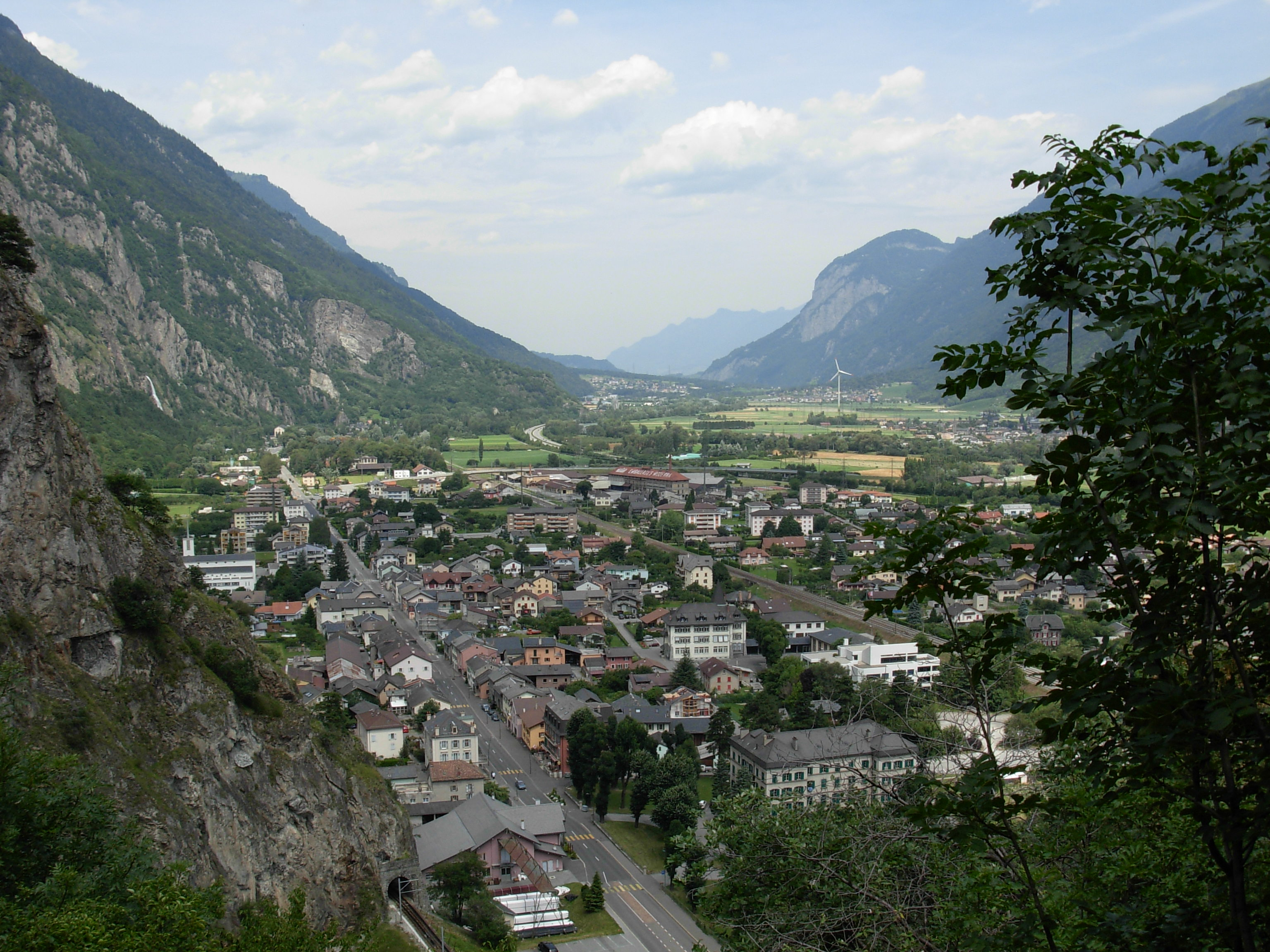

- Flag Coat of arms
- Location of Vernayaz
- Location within Switzerland Location within Canton of Valais
- Coordinates: 46°8′N 7°2′E
- Country: Switzerland
- Canton: Valais
- District: Saint-Maurice

Government
  - Mayor: Blaise Borgeat

Area
  - Total: 5.61 km^{2} (2.17 sq mi)
- Elevation: 452 m (1,483 ft)

Population (2002)
  - Total: 1,611
  - Density: 287/km^{2} (744/sq mi)
- Demonym: Planain
- Time zone: UTC+01:00 (CET)
  - Summer (DST): UTC+02:00 (CEST)
- Postal code: 1904
- SFOS number: 6219
- ISO 3166 code: CH-VS
- Localities: Miéville
- Surrounded by: Dorénaz, Evionnaz, Martigny, Salvan
- Website: www.vernayaz.ch

Vernayaz is a municipality in the district of Saint-Maurice, in the canton of Valais, Switzerland.

== History ==
In 1913 the municipality was created when it separated from Salvan.

== Geography ==
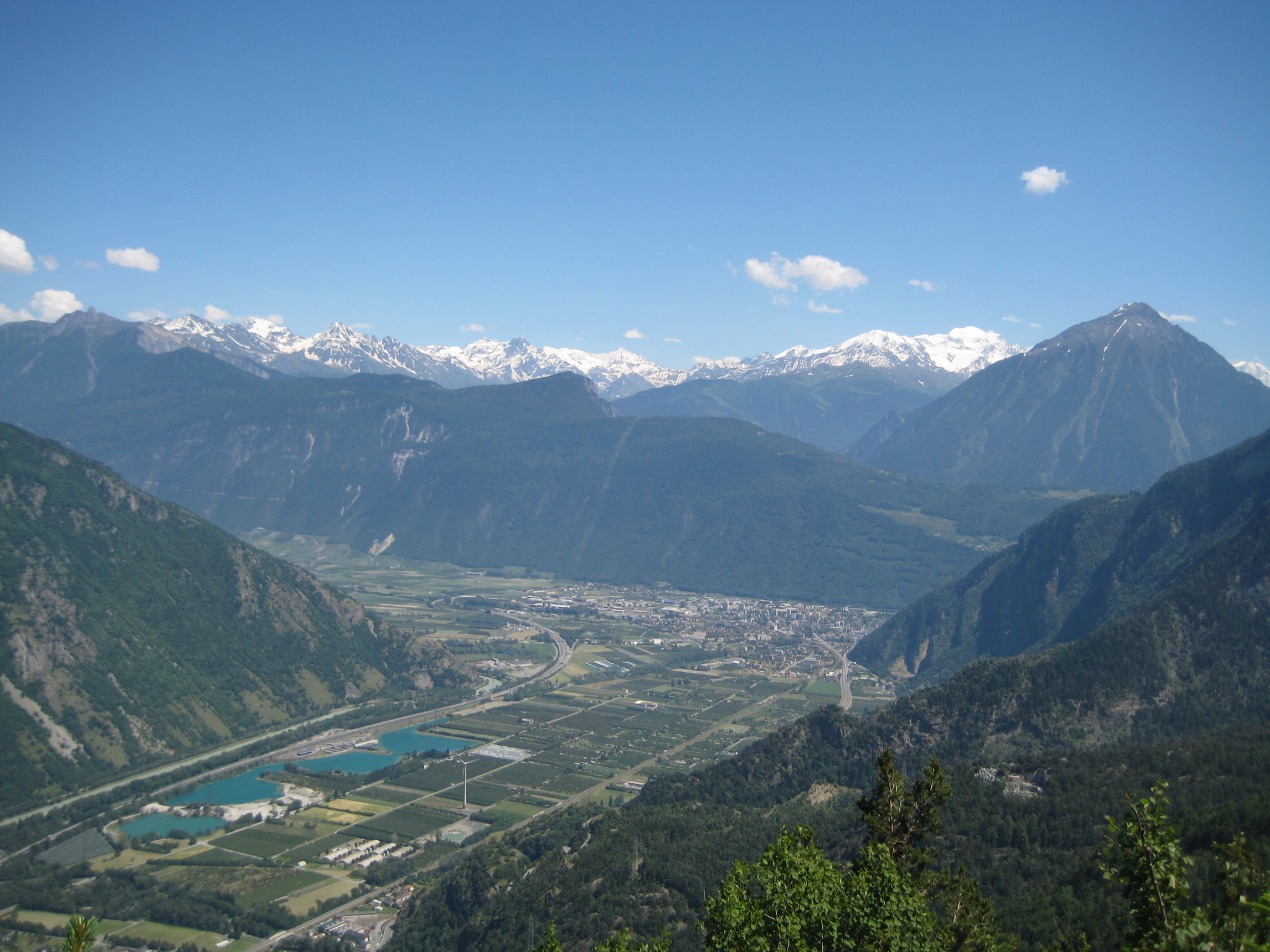
Rhone valley, with the lone wind turbine of Vernayaz in the foreground

Vernayaz has an area, as of 2011, of 5.7 square kilometers (2.2 mi^{2}). Of this area, 12.9% is used for agricultural purposes, while 54.9% is forested. Of the rest of the land, 17.3% is settled (buildings or roads) and 14.9% is unproductive land.

== Coat of arms ==
The blazon of the municipal coat of arms is Quartered Gules a Cross bottony Argent and Sable a Mullet of Five Or overall a pallet wavy Argent.

== Demographics ==
Vernayaz has a population (as of December 2020) of 1,847. As of 2008, 24.5% of the population are resident foreign nationals. Over the last 10 years (2000–2010 ) the population has changed at a rate of 12.6%. It has changed at a rate of 12.5% due to migration and at a rate of 0.7% due to births and deaths.

Most of the population (as of 2000) speaks French (1,413 or 88.5%) as their first language, Italian is the second most common (48 or 3.0%) and Portuguese is the third (47 or 2.9%). There are 23 people who speak German.

As of 2008, the population was 49.3% male and 50.7% female. The population was made up of 646 Swiss men (35.9% of the population) and 241 (13.4%) non-Swiss men. There were 698 Swiss women (38.8%) and 214 (11.9%) non-Swiss women. Of the population in the municipality, 688 or about 43.1% were born in Vernayaz and lived there in 2000. There were 413 or 25.9% who were born in the same canton, while 154 or 9.6% were born somewhere else in Switzerland, and 311 or 19.5% were born outside of Switzerland.

As of 2000, children and teenagers (0–19 years old) make up 26.2% of the population, while adults (20–64 years old) make up 58.2% and seniors (over 64 years old) make up 15.6%.

As of 2000, there were 629 people who were single and never married in the municipality. There were 822 married individuals, 94 widows or widowers and 52 individuals who are divorced.

As of 2000, there were 599 private households in the municipality, and an average of 2.6 persons per household. There were 153 households that consist of only one person and 49 households with five or more people. In 2000, a total of 580 apartments (82.6% of the total) were permanently occupied, while 72 apartments (10.3%) were seasonally occupied and 50 apartments (7.1%) were empty. As of 2009, the construction rate of new housing units was 5 new units per 1000 residents.

The historical population is given in the following chart:

== Sights ==
The entire hamlet of Miéville is designated as part of the Inventory of Swiss Heritage Sites.

The Gueuroz Bridge, formerly the tallest bridge in Europe, connects Vernayaz to the neighboring Salvan across the gorges of the Trient.

== Politics ==
In the 2007 federal election the most popular party was the CVP which received 40.13% of the vote. The next three most popular parties were the FDP (23.62%), the SP (17.46%) and the SVP (12.99%). In the federal election, a total of 688 votes were cast, and the voter turnout was 63.9%.

In the 2009 Conseil d'État/Staatsrat election a total of 698 votes were cast, of which 40 or about 5.7% were invalid. The voter participation was 66.7%, which is much more than the cantonal average of 54.67%. In the 2007 Swiss Council of States election a total of 678 votes were cast, of which 45 or about 6.6% were invalid. The voter participation was 64.7%, which is similar to the cantonal average of 59.88%.

== Economy ==
As of 2010, Vernayaz had an unemployment rate of 7.1%. As of 2008, there were 14 people employed in the primary economic sector and about 7 businesses involved in this sector. 218 people were employed in the secondary sector and there were 19 businesses in this sector. 220 people were employed in the tertiary sector, with 34 businesses in this sector. There were 730 residents of the municipality who were employed in some capacity, of which females made up 40.7% of the workforce.

In 2008 the total number of full-time equivalent jobs was 394. The number of jobs in the primary sector was 7, all of which were in agriculture. The number of jobs in the secondary sector was 211 of which 72 or (34.1%) were in manufacturing and 32 (15.2%) were in construction. The number of jobs in the tertiary sector was 176. In the tertiary sector; 31 or 17.6% were in wholesale or retail sales or the repair of motor vehicles, 52 or 29.5% were in the movement and storage of goods, 26 or 14.8% were in a hotel or restaurant, 26 or 14.8% were in the information industry, 9 or 5.1% were technical professionals or scientists, and 2 or 1.1% were in health care.

In 2000, there were 192 workers who commuted into the municipality and 536 workers who commuted away. The municipality is a net exporter of workers, with about 2.8 workers leaving the municipality for every one entering. Of the working population, 12.2% used public transportation to get to work, and 68.8% used a private car.

== Religion ==
From the 2000 census, 1,364 or 85.4% were Roman Catholic, while 78 or 4.9% belonged to the Swiss Reformed Church. Of the rest of the population, there were 15 members of an Orthodox church (or about 0.94% of the population), there were 4 individuals (or about 0.25% of the population) who belonged to the Christian Catholic Church, and there were 24 individuals (or about 1.50% of the population) who belonged to another Christian church. There were 46 (or about 2.88% of the population) who were Islamic. There was 1 person who was Buddhist. 40 (or about 2.50% of the population) belonged to no church, are agnostic or atheist, and 37 individuals (or about 2.32% of the population) did not answer the question.

== Education ==
In Vernayaz about 556 or (34.8%) of the population have completed non-mandatory upper secondary education, and 115 or (7.2%) have completed additional higher education (either university or a Fachhochschule). Of the 115 who completed tertiary schooling, 60.9% were Swiss men, 29.6% were Swiss women, 5.2% were non-Swiss men and 4.3% were non-Swiss women. As of 2000, there were 15 students in Vernayaz who came from another municipality, while 130 residents attended schools outside the municipality.

== Transportation ==
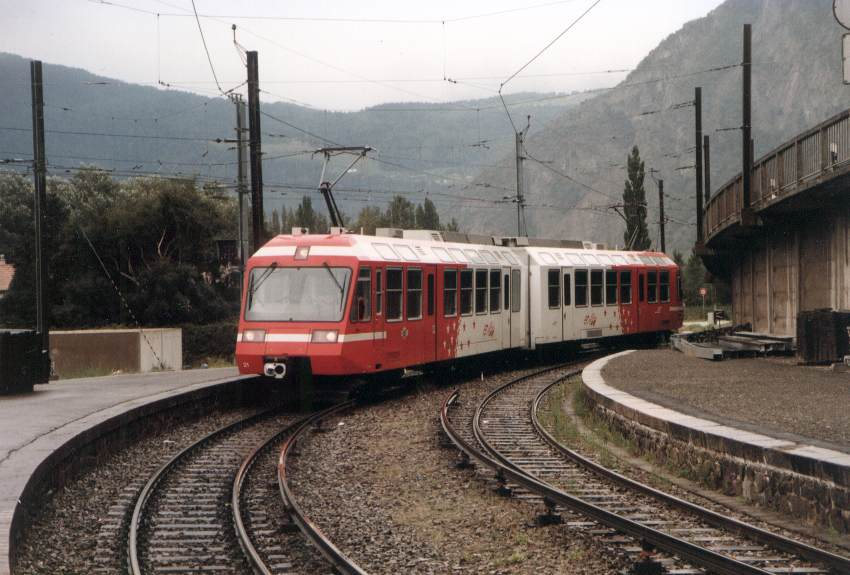
Train of the Martigny–Châtelard line at Vernayaz MC in 2005

The municipality has two railway stations: Vernayaz and Vernayaz MC. The former is located on the Simplon line between Lausanne and Brig, while the latter is on the narrow-gauge Martigny–Châtelard line between Martigny and the French border.
