= Le Châtelard-Frontière railway station =

Railway station in Finhaut, Switzerland

Le Châtelard-Frontière
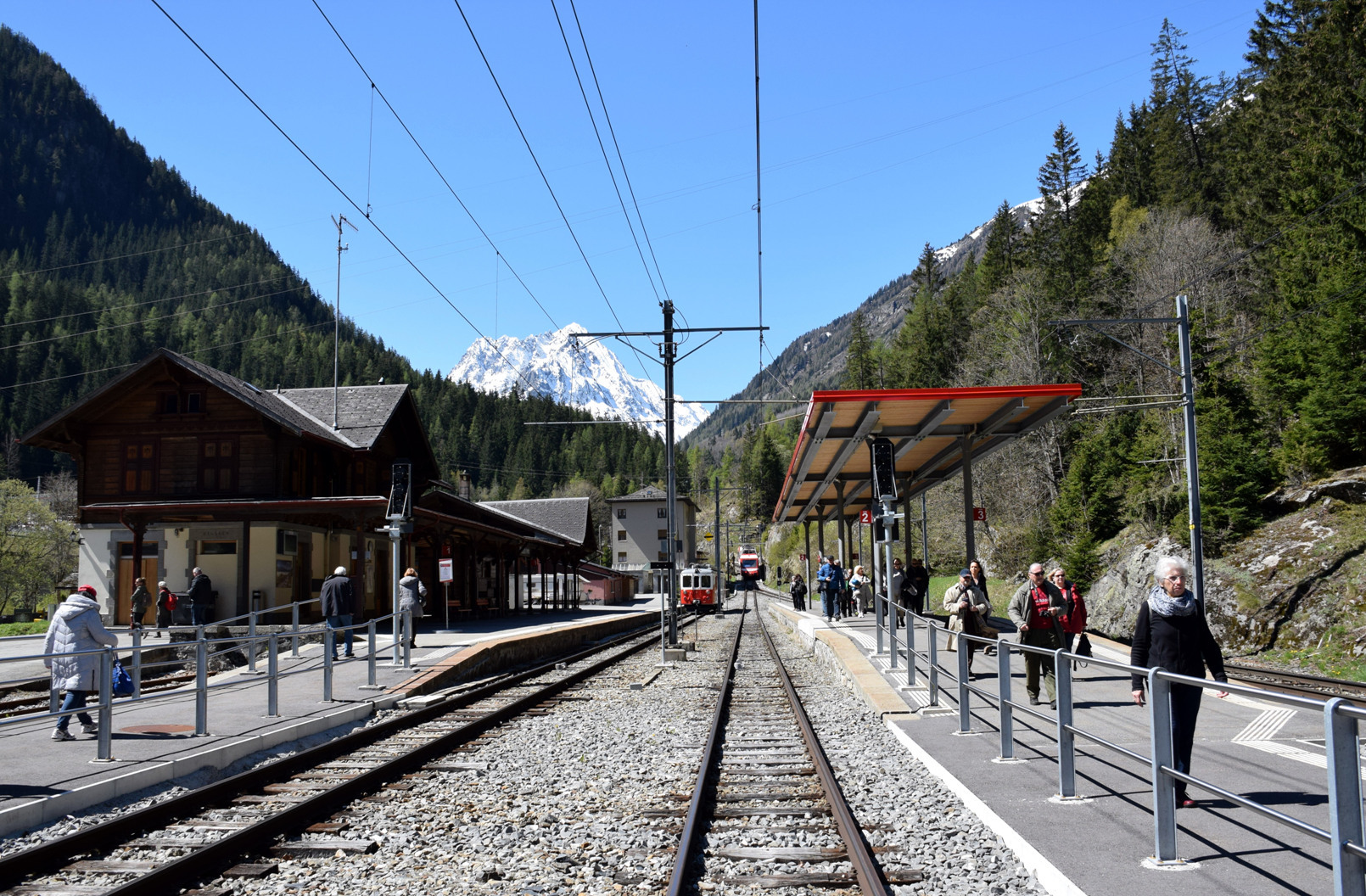
- A train at the station in 2019

General information
- Location: Finhaut; Switzerland
- Coordinates: 46°03′12″N 6°57′00″E
- Elevation: 1,116 m (3,661 ft)
- Owner: Transports de Martigny et Régions
- Line: Martigny–Châtelard line
- Distance: 18.1 km (11.2 mi) from Martigny
- Platforms: 3; 1 island platform; 1 side platform
- Tracks: 3
- Train operators: Transports de Martigny et Régions
- Connections: CarPostal SA bus line

Construction
- Accessible: Yes

Other information
- Station code: 8501568 (CHFR)

Services
| Preceding station | Transports de Martigny et Régions | Following station |
|---|---|---|
| Vallorcine Terminus | Regio Mont-Blanc Express | Le Châtelard VS towards Martigny |
Location

Le Châtelard-Frontière railway station (French: Gare du Châtelard-Frontière) is a railway station in the municipality of Finhaut, in the Swiss canton of Valais. It is located on the 1,000 mm (3 ft 3 3/8 in) gauge Martigny–Châtelard line of Transports de Martigny et Régions. The station is last one in Switzerland before the line crosses into France.

== Services ==
As of the December 2023 timetable change, the following services stop at Le Châtelard-Frontière:

- Regio Mont-Blanc Express: hourly service between Martigny and Vallorcine.
