= Salvan =

Swiss municipality

- Municipality
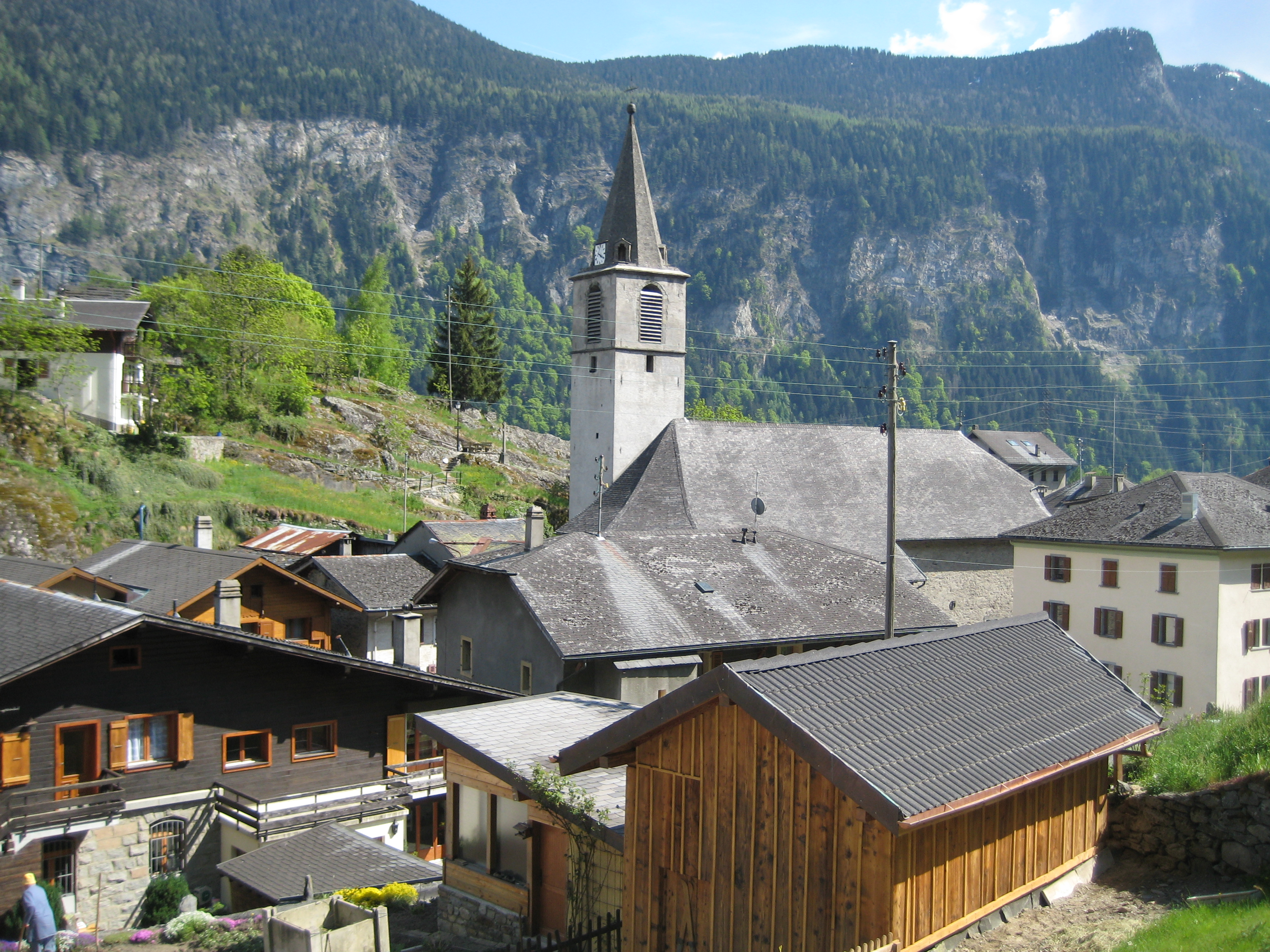

- Flag Coat of arms
- Location of Salvan
- Location within Switzerland Location within Canton of Valais
- Coordinates: 46°7′N 7°1′E
- Country: Switzerland
- Canton: Valais
- District: Saint-Maurice

Government
  - Mayor: Florian Piasenta

Area
  - Total: 53.5 km^{2} (20.7 sq mi)
- Elevation: 912 m (2,992 ft)

Population (December 2002)
  - Total: 1,118
  - Density: 20.9/km^{2} (54.1/sq mi)
- Time zone: UTC+01:00 (CET)
  - Summer (DST): UTC+02:00 (CEST)
- Postal code: 1922
- SFOS number: 6218
- ISO 3166 code: CH-VS
- Surrounded by: Evionnaz, Finhaut, Martigny, Martigny-Combe, Sixt-Fer-à-Cheval (FR-74), Trient, Vernayaz
- Website: www.salvan.ch

Salvan (French pronunciation: [salvɑ̃]) is a municipality in the Saint-Maurice District, in Valais, Switzerland.

== History ==
Salvan is first mentioned in 1018 as cum Silvano. Around 1025-31 it was mentioned as in monte Salvano. The municipality was formerly known by its German name Scharwang, however, that name is no longer used. In the 11th century, the Abbey of Saint-Maurice had rights over Salvan (as well as Ottanel), probably donated to it by Rudolph III of Burgundy. In the 19th century, Salvan developed rapidly as a resort after the creation of a carriage road in 1855, and in 1906 the Martigny–Châtelard line.

On 5 October 1994, 25 people were found dead in three burned-out chalets in Salvan in what turned out to be a mass murder-suicide. The chalets were owned by Luc Jouret, founder of the Order of the Solar Temple. Several victims of the fire were children.

== Geography ==
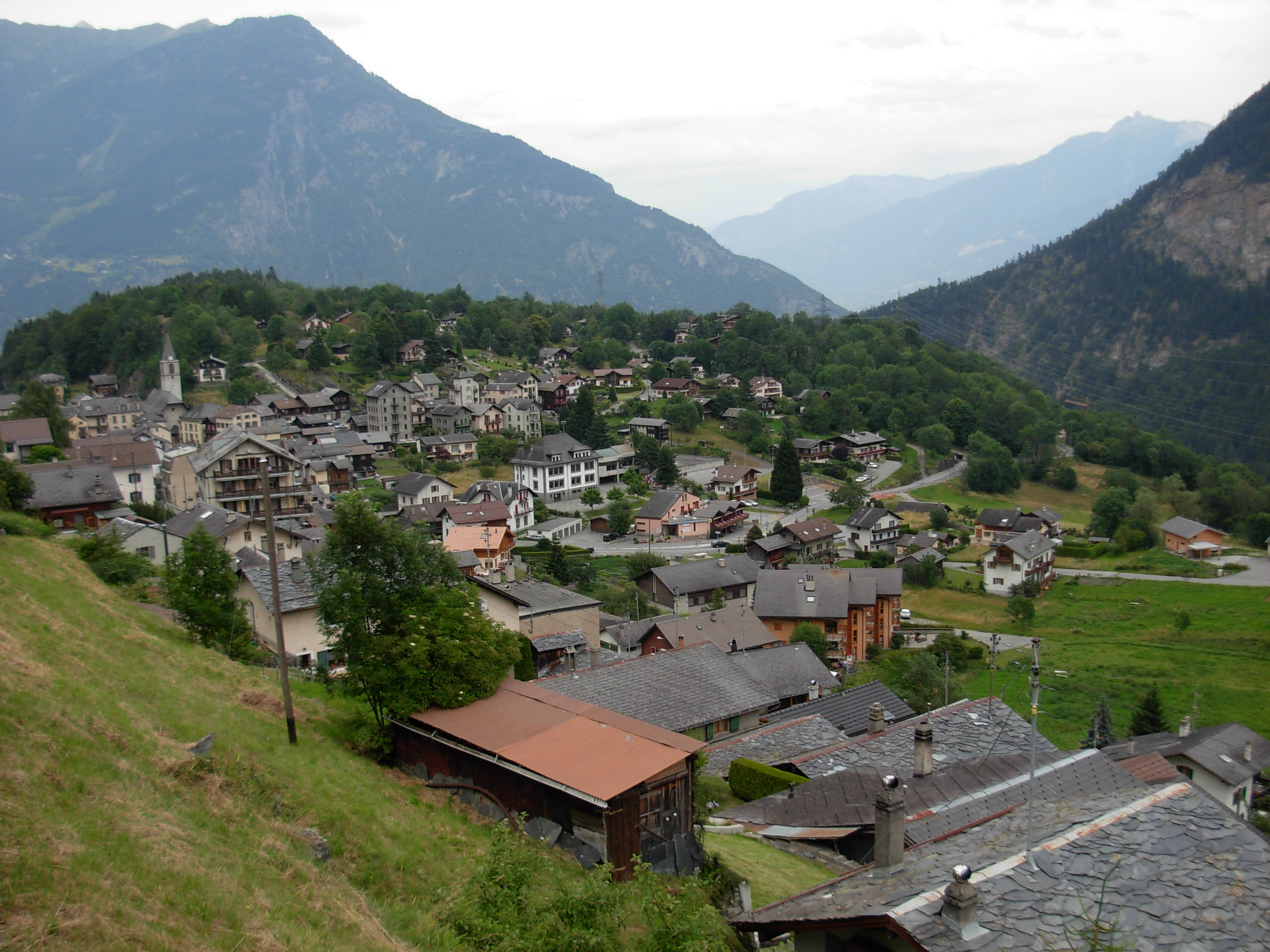
Salvan village

Salvan has an area, as of 2011, of 53.5 square kilometers (20.7 mi^{2}). Of this area, 7.5% is used for agricultural purposes, while 25.7% is forested. Of the rest of the land, 1.6% is settled (buildings or roads) and 65.2% is unproductive land.

The municipality is located in the Saint-Maurice district, in the Trient Valley. It consists of the village of Salvan and several hamlets, including Les Marécottes and until 1912, Vernayaz, Miéville and Gueuroz. Les Marécottes, a storage basin for the Swiss Federal Railways, is listed as a Swiss heritage site of national significance. The entire hamlet of Le Trétien is part of the Inventory of Swiss Heritage Sites.

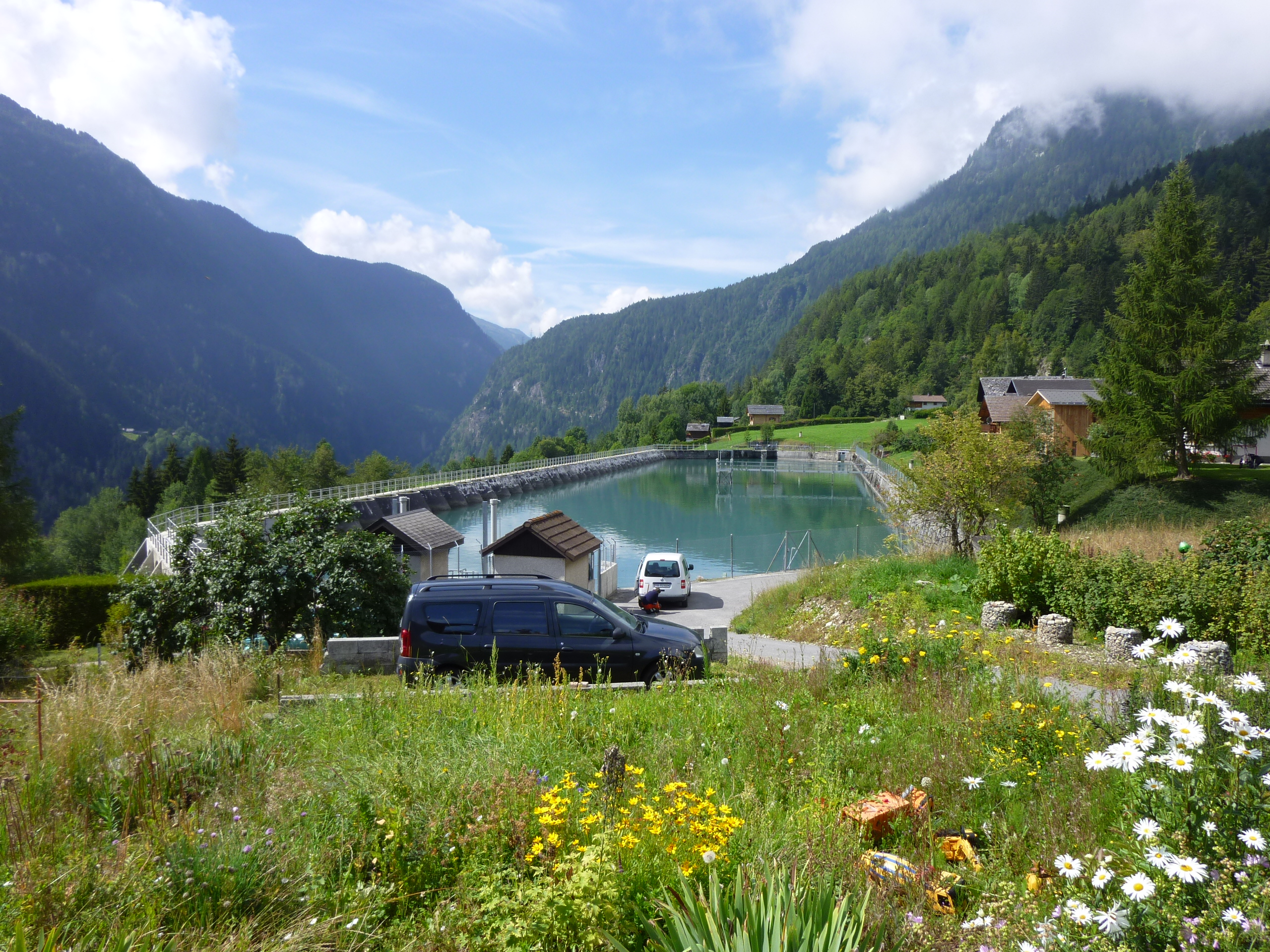
Les Marécottes

The territory of the municipality includes a significant portion of the Trient valley (along with the municipality of Finhaut) and two of its important side valleys: the entire Vallon d'Emaney (drained by the Triège) and the upper section of the Vallée de Barberine (drained by the Barberine and the Eau Noire) who is notably occupied by the artificial lake of Émosson. A small part of the territory of the municipality is not drained by the river Trient: it is the Vallon de Van, drained by the Salanfe which ends directly in the Rhone.

Although the municipality does not include the highest peak of the Trient Valley, several summits over 3,000 metres lie there. The highest are Tour Sallière and Mont Ruan, both in the Vallée de Barberine.

== Coat of arms ==
The blazon of the municipal coat of arms is "D'argent au sapin au naturel issant de trois coupeaux de sinople, ehapé ployé de gueules à la croix tréfléc d'argent à dextre et à l'étoile à sept rais du même à senestre." transl. Silver with a natural fir tree issuing from three vert branches, bent red with a trefoiled silver cross on the right and a seven-pointed star of the same on the left.

== Demographics ==
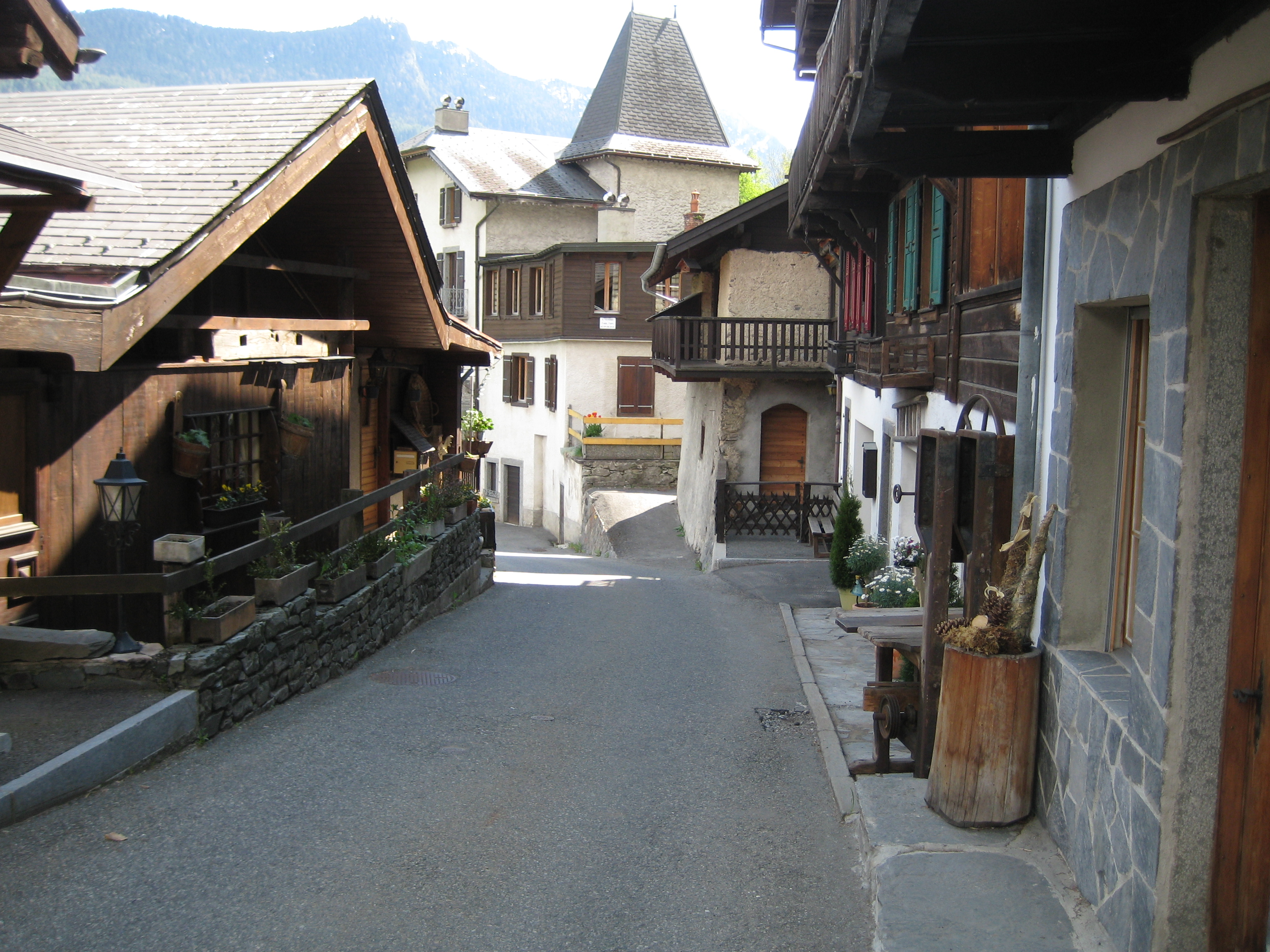
Street in Salvan

Salvan has a population (as of December 2020) of 1,442. As of 2008, 7.1% of the population are resident foreign nationals. Over the last 10 years (2000–2010 ) the population has changed at a rate of 0.6%. It has changed at a rate of 7.1% due to migration and at a rate of -3.9% due to births and deaths.

Most of the population (as of 2000) speaks French (947 or 92.8%) as their first language, German is the second most common (31 or 3.0%) and Dutch is the third (10 or 1.0%). There are 6 people who speak Italian.

As of 2008, the population was 47.4% male and 52.6% female. The population was made up of 495 Swiss men (44.4% of the population) and 33 (3.0%) non-Swiss men. There were 538 Swiss women (48.3%) and 48 (4.3%) non-Swiss women. Of the population in the municipality, 522 or about 51.2% were born in Salvan and lived there in 2000. There were 159 or 15.6% who were born in the same canton, while 168 or 16.5% were born somewhere else in Switzerland, and 141 or 13.8% were born outside of Switzerland.

As of 2000, children and teenagers (0–19 years old) make up 22.5% of the population, while adults (20–64 years old) make up 57.4% and seniors (over 64 years old) make up 20.1%.

As of 2000, there were 381 people who were single and never married in the municipality. There were 500 married individuals, 77 widows or widowers and 62 individuals who are divorced.

As of 2000, there were 439 private households in the municipality, and an average of 2.2 persons per household. There were 163 households that consist of only one person and 25 households with five or more people. In 2000, a total of 418 apartments (38.3% of the total) were permanently occupied, while 601 apartments (55.0%) were seasonally occupied and 73 apartments (6.7%) were empty. As of 2009, the construction rate of new housing units was 8.1 new units per 1000 residents.

From the 2000 census, 810 or 79.4% were Roman Catholic, while 90 or 8.8% belonged to the Swiss Reformed Church. Of the rest of the population, there were 9 members of an Orthodox church (or about 0.88% of the population), and there were 5 individuals (or about 0.49% of the population) who belonged to another Christian church. There were 2 individuals (or about 0.20% of the population) who were Jewish, and 3 (or about 0.29% of the population) who were Islamic. There were 2 individuals who belonged to another church. 68 (or about 6.67% of the population) belonged to no church, are agnostic or atheist, and 33 individuals (or about 3.24% of the population) did not answer the question.

The historical population is given in the following chart:

== Twin Towns ==
Salvan is twinned with the towns of St-Jeannet, Nice, France and Saint-Jeannet, Alpes-Maritimes, France.

== Politics ==
In the 2007 federal election the most popular party was the CVP which received 43.21% of the vote. The next three most popular parties were the FDP (22.63%), the SP (14.75%) and the SVP (9.32%). In the federal election, a total of 520 votes were cast, and the voter turnout was 57.6%.

In the 2009 Conseil d'État/Staatsrat election a total of 417 votes were cast, of which 35 or about 8.4% were invalid. The voter participation was 47.6%, which is much less than the cantonal average of 54.67%. In the 2007 Swiss Council of States election a total of 501 votes were cast, of which 30 or about 6.0% were invalid. The voter participation was 58.8%, which is similar to the cantonal average of 59.88%.

== Economy ==
As of 2010, Salvan had an unemployment rate of 4.6%. As of 2008, there were 15 people employed in the primary economic sector and about 7 businesses involved in this sector. 29 people were employed in the secondary sector and there were 11 businesses in this sector. 207 people were employed in the tertiary sector, with 38 businesses in this sector. There were 455 residents of the municipality who were employed in some capacity, of which females made up 43.5% of the workforce.

In 2008 the total number of full-time equivalent jobs was 182. The number of jobs in the primary sector was 6, all of which were in agriculture. The number of jobs in the secondary sector was 25 of which 12 or (48.0%) were in manufacturing and 14 (56.0%) were in construction. The number of jobs in the tertiary sector was 151. In the tertiary sector; 10 or 6.6% were in wholesale or retail sales or the repair of motor vehicles, 7 or 4.6% were in the movement and storage of goods, 36 or 23.8% were in a hotel or restaurant, 2 or 1.3% were the insurance or financial industry, 5 or 3.3% were technical professionals or scientists, 7 or 4.6% were in education and 55 or 36.4% were in health care.

In 2000, there were 51 workers who commuted into the municipality and 262 workers who commuted away. The municipality is a net exporter of workers, with about 5.1 workers leaving the municipality for every one entering. Of the working population, 10.8% used public transportation to get to work, and 62.6% used a private car.

== Education ==
In Salvan about 385 or (37.7%) of the population have completed non-mandatory upper secondary education, and 108 or (10.6%) have completed additional higher education (either university or a Fachhochschule). Of the 108 who completed tertiary schooling, 51.9% were Swiss men, 28.7% were Swiss women, 8.3% were non-Swiss men and 11.1% were non-Swiss women.

As of 2000, there were 5 students in Salvan who came from another municipality, while 83 residents attended schools outside the municipality. Salvan is home to the Bibliothèque communale et scolaire library. The library has (as of 2008) 4,031 books or other media, and loaned out 7,169 items in the same year. It was open a total of 80 days with average of 6 hours per week during that year.

== Transportation ==
The narrow-gauge Martigny–Châtelard line passes through the eastern edge of the municipality and has four stations: Salvan, Les Marécottes, La Médettaz, and Le Trétien.

== Skiing ==
The ski area located above Les Marécottes is relatively small and ranges from an elevation of 1100 m to 2200 m and has five lifts. 1 Gondola Lift, 1 Chairlift, 1 Platter Lifts and 1 Rope Tow. There are 25 km of varied runs, ranging from steep black slopes like "Le Rec" to easy blue pistes like "Le Perron". Les Marécottes is part of "Ski Super St. Bernard", a group of several other small ski resorts located in the Martigny-St. Bernard area that share one common skipass. This group includes other villages such as: La Fouly, Champex, Vichères, Bruson and Super St. Bernard (now closed). Les Marécottes is different in the sense that it is the only of the 6 ski resorts which owns itself, all the other were bought by Téléverbier (The operator of Verbier ski lifts).

The ski lifts in the Marécottes-La Creusaz ski area are relatively old, in the summer of 2012, a new detachable chairlift along with a new platter lift will be replacing the two that are currently there.
