= Evionnaz railway station =

Railway station in Evionnaz, Switzerland

Evionnaz
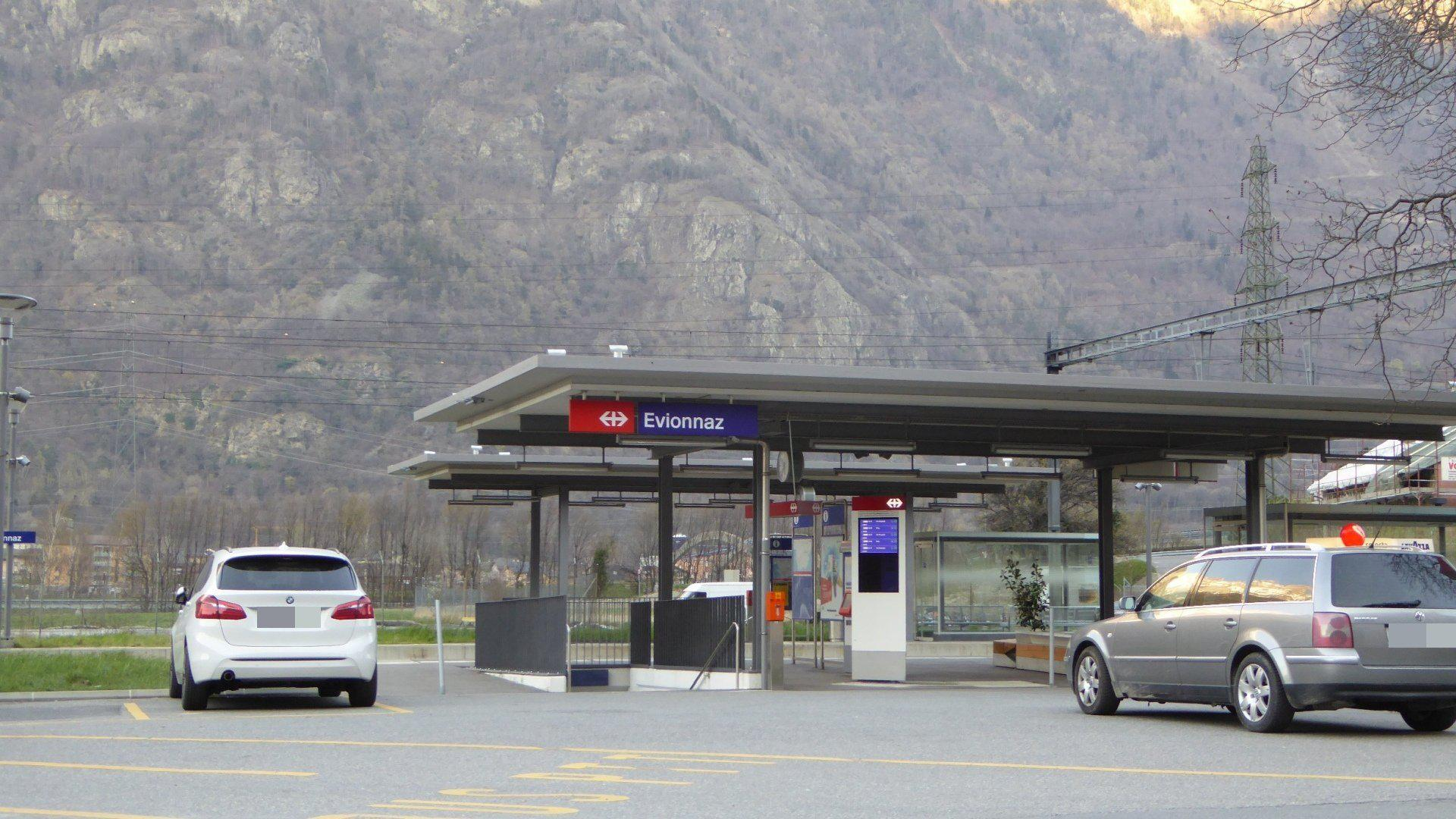
- The station platform in 2019

General information
- Location: Evionnaz; Switzerland
- Coordinates: 46°10′09″N 7°01′32″E
- Elevation: 448 m (1,470 ft)
- Owner: Swiss Federal Railways
- Line: Simplon line
- Distance: 57.9 km (36.0 mi) from Lausanne
- Platforms: 2 side platforms
- Tracks: 2
- Train operators: RegionAlps
- Connections: CarPostal SA bus line

Construction
- Parking: Yes (25 spaces)
- Cycle facilities: Yes (8 spaces)
- Accessible: Platforms only

Other information
- Station code: 8501404 (EV)

Passengers
- 2023: 500 per weekday (RegionAlps)

Services
Preceding station	RegionAlps	Following station
St-Maurice towards St-Gingolph	R91	Vernayaz towards Brig
St-Maurice towards Monthey	R91	Vernayaz towards Brig
Location

Evionnaz railway station (French: Gare d'Evionnaz, German: Bahnhof Evionnaz) is a railway station in the municipality of Evionnaz, in the Swiss canton of Valais. It is an intermediate stop on the Simplon line and is served by local trains only.

== Services ==
As of the December 2024 timetable change, the following services stop at Evionnaz:

- Regio: half-hourly service between Monthey and Brig, with every other train continuing from Monthey to St-Gingolph.
