= Finhaut =

- Municipality
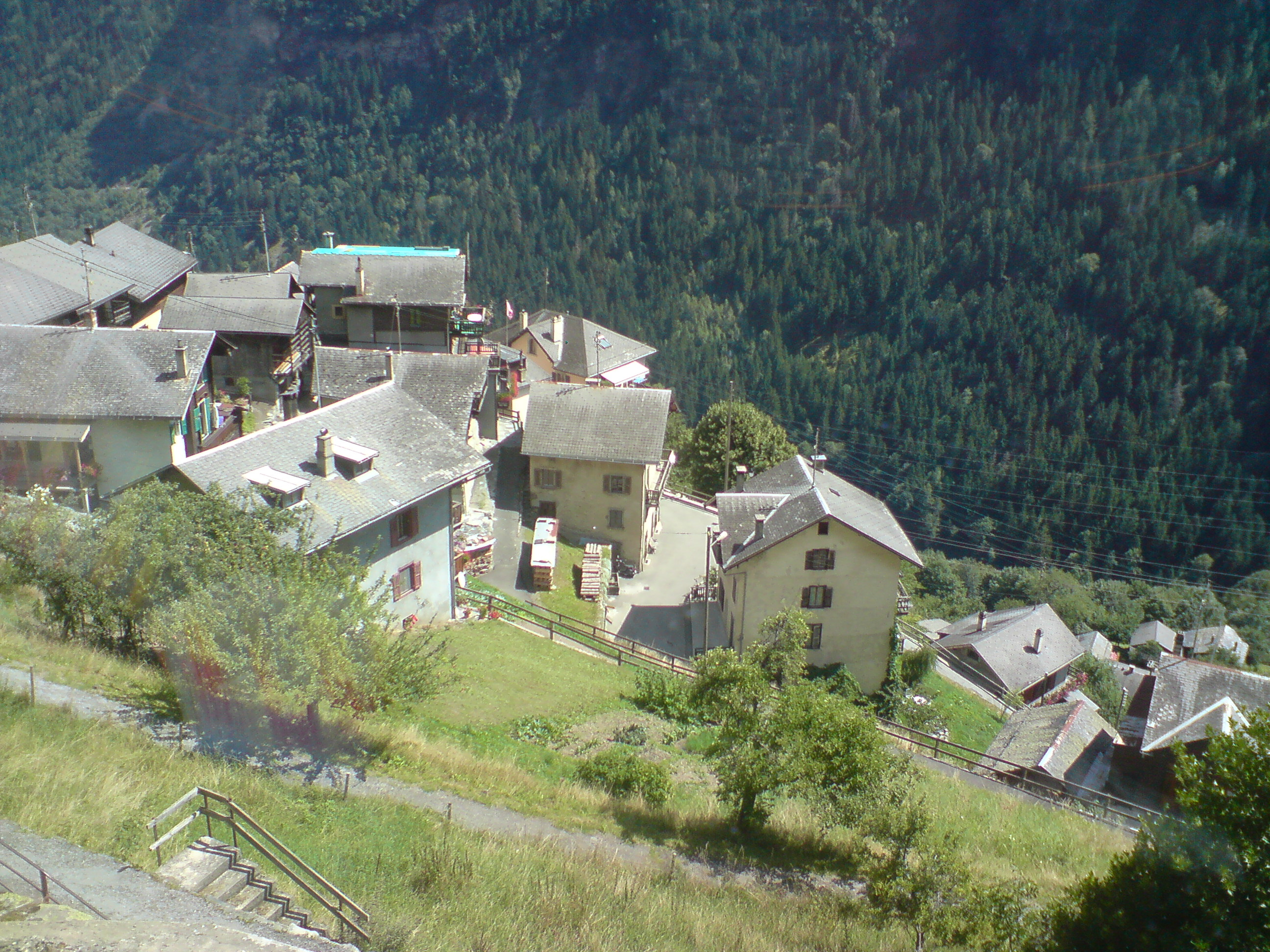
- Finhaut village

- Flag Coat of arms
- Location of Finhaut
- Location within Switzerland Location within Canton of Valais
- Coordinates: 46°5′N 6°58′E
- Country: Switzerland
- Canton: Valais
- District: Saint-Maurice

Government
  - Mayor: Andrea Ridolfi

Area
  - Total: 22.8 km^{2} (8.8 sq mi)
- Elevation: 1,224 m (4,016 ft)

Population (December 2002)
  - Total: 348
  - Density: 15.3/km^{2} (39.5/sq mi)
- Time zone: UTC+01:00 (CET)
  - Summer (DST): UTC+02:00 (CEST)
- Postal code: 1925
- SFOS number: 6214
- ISO 3166 code: CH-VS
- Localities: Finhaut, Giétroz, Châtelard
- Surrounded by: Salvan, Sixt-Fer-à-Cheval (FR-74), Trient, Vallorcine (FR-74)
- Website: www.finhaut.ch

Finhaut is a municipality in the district of Saint-Maurice in the canton of Valais in Switzerland.

== History ==
Finhaut is first mentioned in 1293 as Finyaux.

== Geography ==
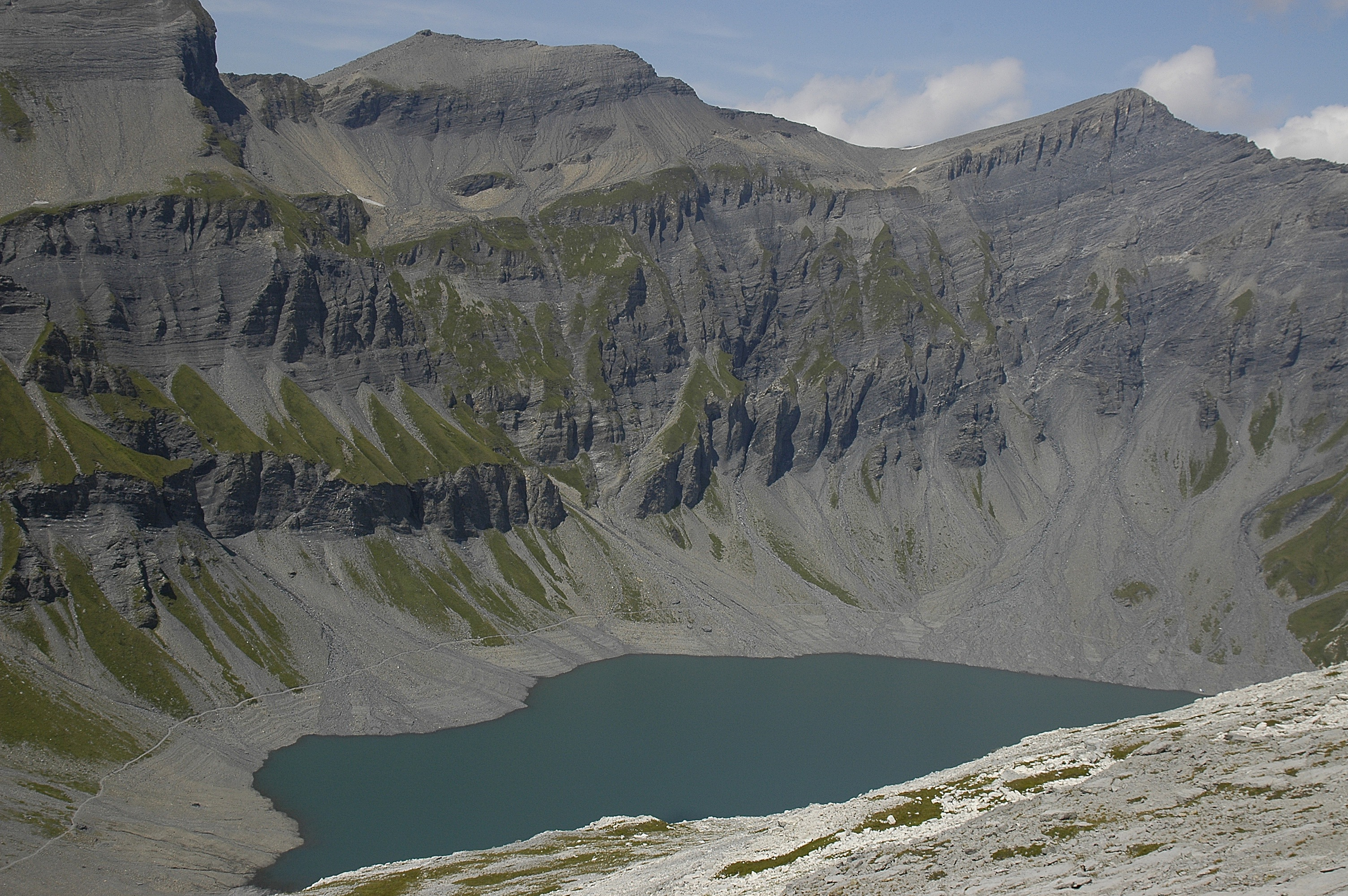
Lac d'Émosson

Finhaut has an area, as of 2011, of 22.8 square kilometers (8.8 mi^{2}). Of this area, 3.2% is used for agricultural purposes, while 26.3% is forested. Of the rest of the land, 2.6% is settled (buildings or roads) and 67.8% is unproductive land.

The municipality is located in the Saint-Maurice district, in the upper Trient valley on the French border. It consists of the village of Finhaut and the hamlets of Giétroz and Le Châtelard.

Lac d'Émosson is a reservoir (of the Émosson Dam) partially located in the municipality. The 17th stage of the 2016 Tour de France ended near the dam.

== Coat of arms ==
The blazon of the municipal coat of arms is Gules, a Castle Argent embattled with three towers windowed Sable middle one roofed in chief two Arrows Or in saltire.

== Demographics ==
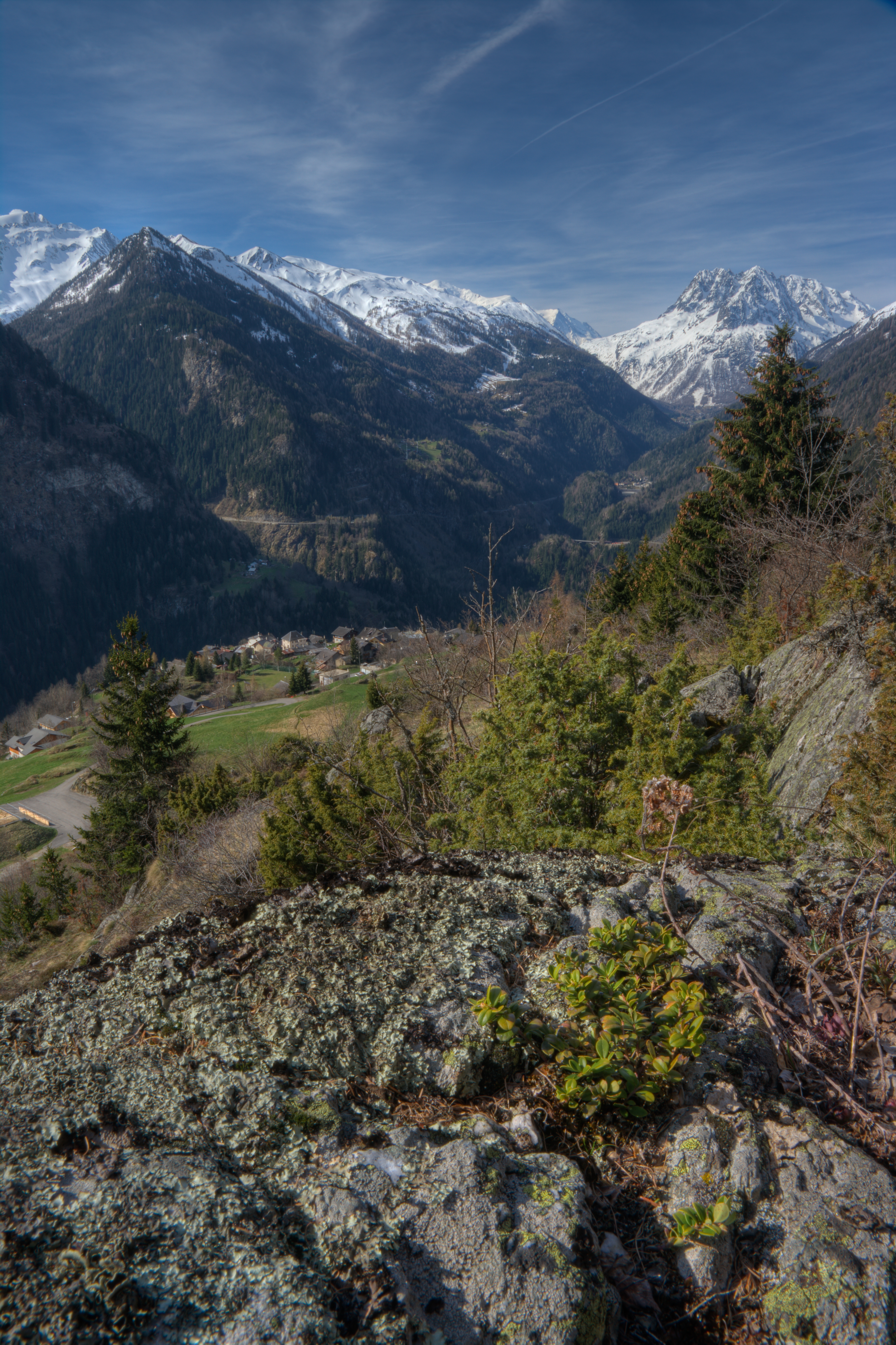
Finhaut village

Finhaut has a population (as of December 2020) of 381. As of 2008, 17.2% of the population are resident foreign nationals. Over the last 10 years (2000–2010 ) the population has changed at a rate of 6.4%. It has changed at a rate of 12.2% due to migration and at a rate of 0% due to births and deaths.

Most of the population (as of 2000) speaks French (308 or 96.9%) as their first language, German is the second most common (6 or 1.9%) and Italian is the third (2 or 0.6%).

As of 2008, the population was 53.1% male and 46.9% female. The population was made up of 148 Swiss men (40.3% of the population) and 47 (12.8%) non-Swiss men. There were 143 Swiss women (39.0%) and 29 (7.9%) non-Swiss women. Of the population in the municipality, 175 or about 55.0% were born in Finhaut and lived there in 2000. There were 52 or 16.4% who were born in the same canton, while 43 or 13.5% were born somewhere else in Switzerland, and 35 or 11.0% were born outside of Switzerland.

As of 2000, children and teenagers (0–19 years old) make up 23.3% of the population, while adults (20–64 years old) make up 57.5% and seniors (over 64 years old) make up 19.2%.

As of 2000, there were 134 people who were single and never married in the municipality. There were 144 married individuals, 28 widows or widowers and 12 individuals who are divorced.

As of 2000, there were 130 private households in the municipality, and an average of 2.4 persons per household. There were 46 households that consist of only one person and 11 households with five or more people. In 2000, a total of 129 apartments (34.9% of the total) were permanently occupied, while 172 apartments (46.5%) were seasonally occupied and 69 apartments (18.6%) were empty. As of 2009, the construction rate of new housing units was 2.7 new units per 1000 residents.

Historical population

Year	Pop.	±% p.a.
1798	347	—
1850	470	+0.59%
1860	433	−0.82%
1870	408	−0.59%
1880	400	−0.20%
1888	396	−0.13%

Year	Pop.	±% p.a.
1900	433	+0.75%
1910	455	+0.50%
1920	633	+3.36%
1930	445	−3.46%
1941	444	−0.02%
1950	492	+1.15%

Year	Pop.	±% p.a.
1960	507	+0.30%
1970	681	+2.99%
1980	338	−6.77%
1990	293	−1.42%
2000	318	+0.82%

== Sights ==
The entire Finhaut area is designated as part of the Inventory of Swiss Heritage Sites.

== Politics ==
In the 2007 federal election the most popular party was the CVP which received 55.09% of the vote. The next three most popular parties were the FDP (15.6%), the SP (13.14%) and the SVP (7.96%). In the federal election, a total of 183 votes were cast, and the voter turnout was 66.3%.

In the 2009 Conseil d'État/Staatsrat election a total of 165 votes were cast, of which 8 or about 4.8% were invalid. The voter participation was 64.5%, which is much more than the cantonal average of 54.67%. In the 2007 Swiss Council of States election a total of 178 votes were cast, of which 12 or about 6.7% were invalid. The voter participation was 65.4%, which is much more than the cantonal average of 59.88%.

== Economy ==
As of 2010, Finhaut had an unemployment rate of 2%. As of 2008, there were 7 people employed in the primary economic sector and about 3 businesses involved in this sector. No one was employed in the secondary sector. 106 people were employed in the tertiary sector, with 29 businesses in this sector. There were 157 residents of the municipality who were employed in some capacity, of which females made up 40.1% of the workforce.

In 2008 the total number of full-time equivalent jobs was 80. The number of jobs in the primary sector was 2, all of which were in agriculture. There were no jobs in the secondary sector. The number of jobs in the tertiary sector was 78. In the tertiary sector; 9 or 11.5% were in wholesale or retail sales or the repair of motor vehicles, 24 or 30.8% were in the movement and storage of goods, 25 or 32.1% were in a hotel or restaurant, 1 was the insurance or financial industry, 4 or 5.1% were in education.

In 2000, there were 28 workers who commuted into the municipality and 64 workers who commuted away. The municipality is a net exporter of workers, with about 2.3 workers leaving the municipality for every one entering. Of the working population, 14.6% used public transportation to get to work, and 42.7% used a private car.

== Religion ==
From the 2000 census, 275 or 86.5% were Roman Catholic, while 14 or 4.4% belonged to the Swiss Reformed Church. 14 (or about 4.40% of the population) belonged to no church, are agnostic or atheist, and 15 individuals (or about 4.72% of the population) did not answer the question.

== Education ==
In Finhaut about 121 or (38.1%) of the population have completed non-mandatory upper secondary education, and 26 or (8.2%) have completed additional higher education (either university or a Fachhochschule). Of the 26 who completed tertiary schooling, 50.0% were Swiss men, 23.1% were Swiss women.

As of 2000, there were 30 students in Finhaut who came from another municipality, while 24 residents attended schools outside the municipality.

== Transportation ==
The narrow-gauge Martigny–Châtelard line passes through the eastern edge of the municipality and has three stations: Finhaut, Le Châtelard VS, and Le Châtelard-Frontière.

== See also ==
- Chemin de Fer de Martigny au Châtelard
- Col de la Forclaz
- Le Châtelard
