= Vallorcine =

Vallorcine Valorsnà (Savoyard)
- Commune
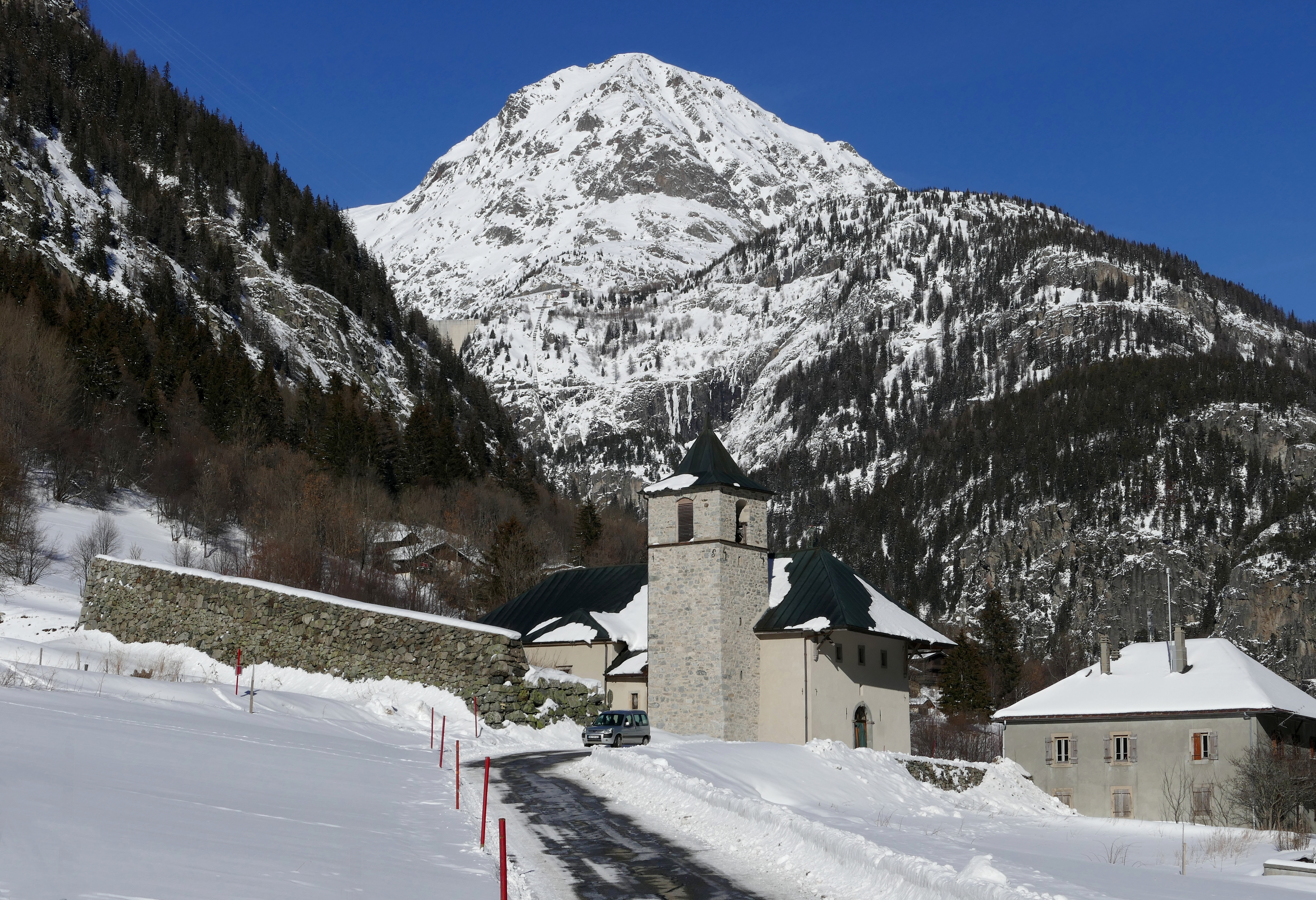
- Église Notre-Dame-de-l'Assomption
- Location of Vallorcine
- Location within France Location within Auvergne-Rhône-Alpes
- Coordinates: 46°02′07″N 6°56′02″E
- Country: France
- Region: Auvergne-Rhône-Alpes
- Department: Haute-Savoie
- Arrondissement: Bonneville
- Canton: Le Mont-Blanc
- Intercommunality: Vallée de Chamonix-Mont-Blanc

Government
  - Mayor (2020–2026): Jérémy Vallas
- Area^{1}: 44.57 km^{2} (17.21 sq mi)
- Highest elevation: 3,098 m (10,164 ft)
- Lowest elevation: 1,120 m (3,670 ft)
- Population (2023): 453
  - Density: 10.2/km^{2} (26.3/sq mi)
- Time zone: UTC+01:00 (CET)
  - Summer (DST): UTC+02:00 (CEST)
- INSEE/Postal code: 74290 /74660
- Website: Vallorcine.com
- ^{1} French Land Register data, which excludes lakes, ponds, glaciers > 1 km^{2} (0.386 sq mi or 247 acres) and river estuaries.

Vallorcine (French pronunciation: [valɔʁsin]; Savoyard: Valorsnà) is a commune in the Haute-Savoie department in the Auvergne-Rhône-Alpes region in southeastern France.

== Geography ==
Vallorcine is located in the Valley of the L'Eau Noire between the Col des Montets and the Swiss border.

It is the terminus of the Saint-Gervais–Vallorcine railway on the route between Saint-Gervais-les-Bains in France and Martigny in Switzerland; it is served by a railway station where passengers must change between French and Swiss trains. In the Swiss direction, the line continues to Le Châtelard where it joins the Martigny–Châtelard Railway which is partially rack-operated.

There is a small museum at Barberine next to the Swiss border and there is a tourist information office and a post office near the railway station.

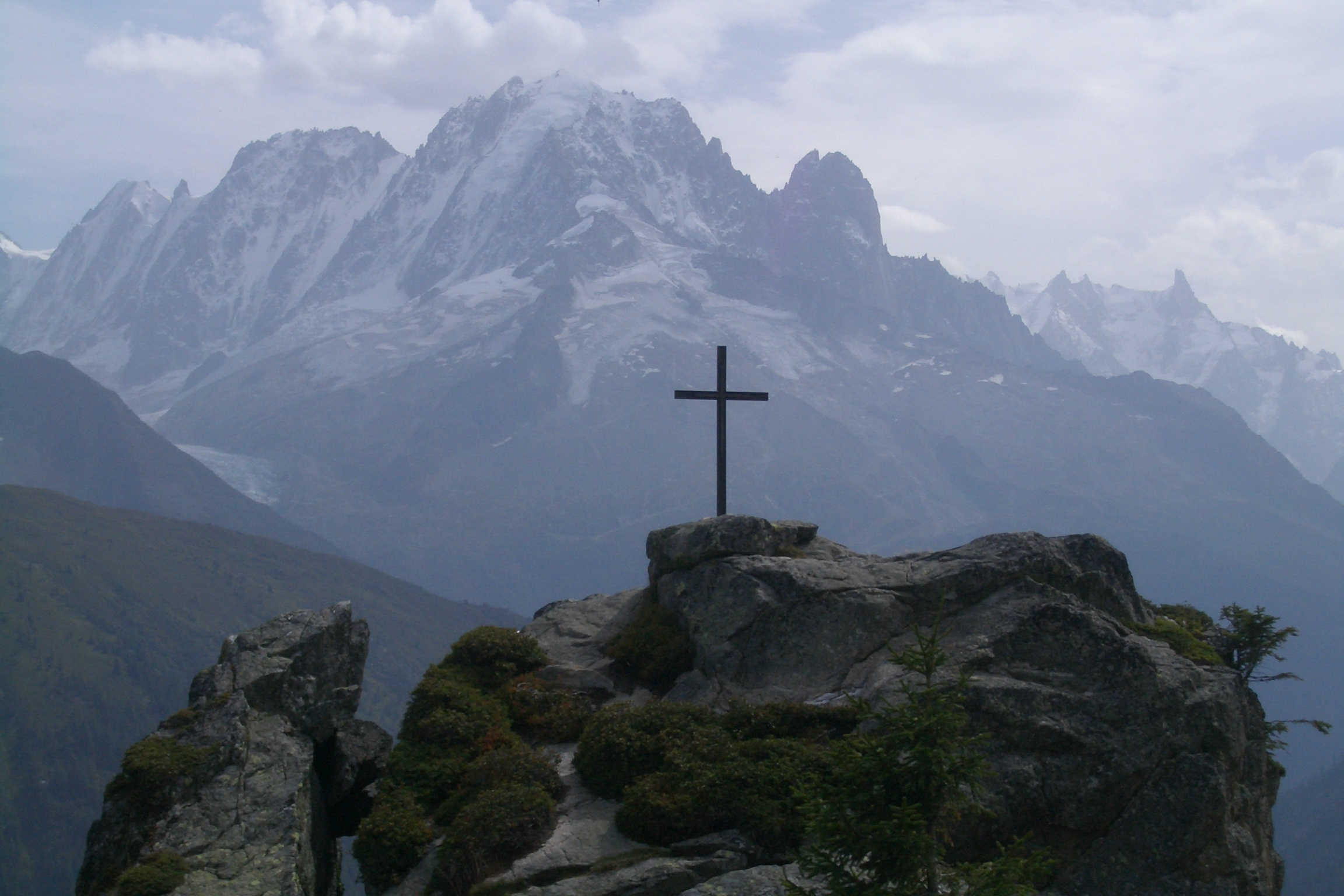
The Cross of Loriaz on the heights of Vallorcine

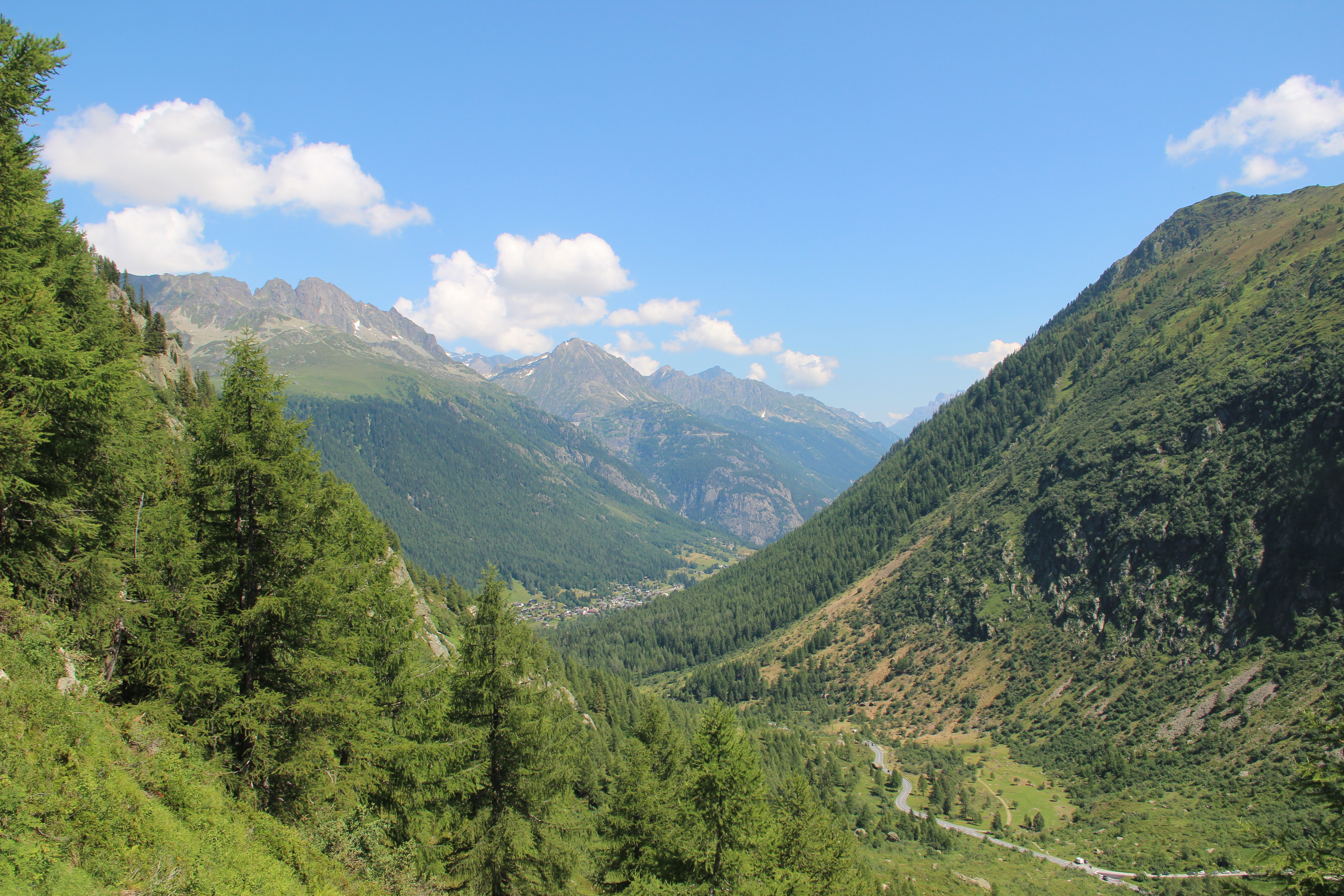
View of Vallorcine in the valley

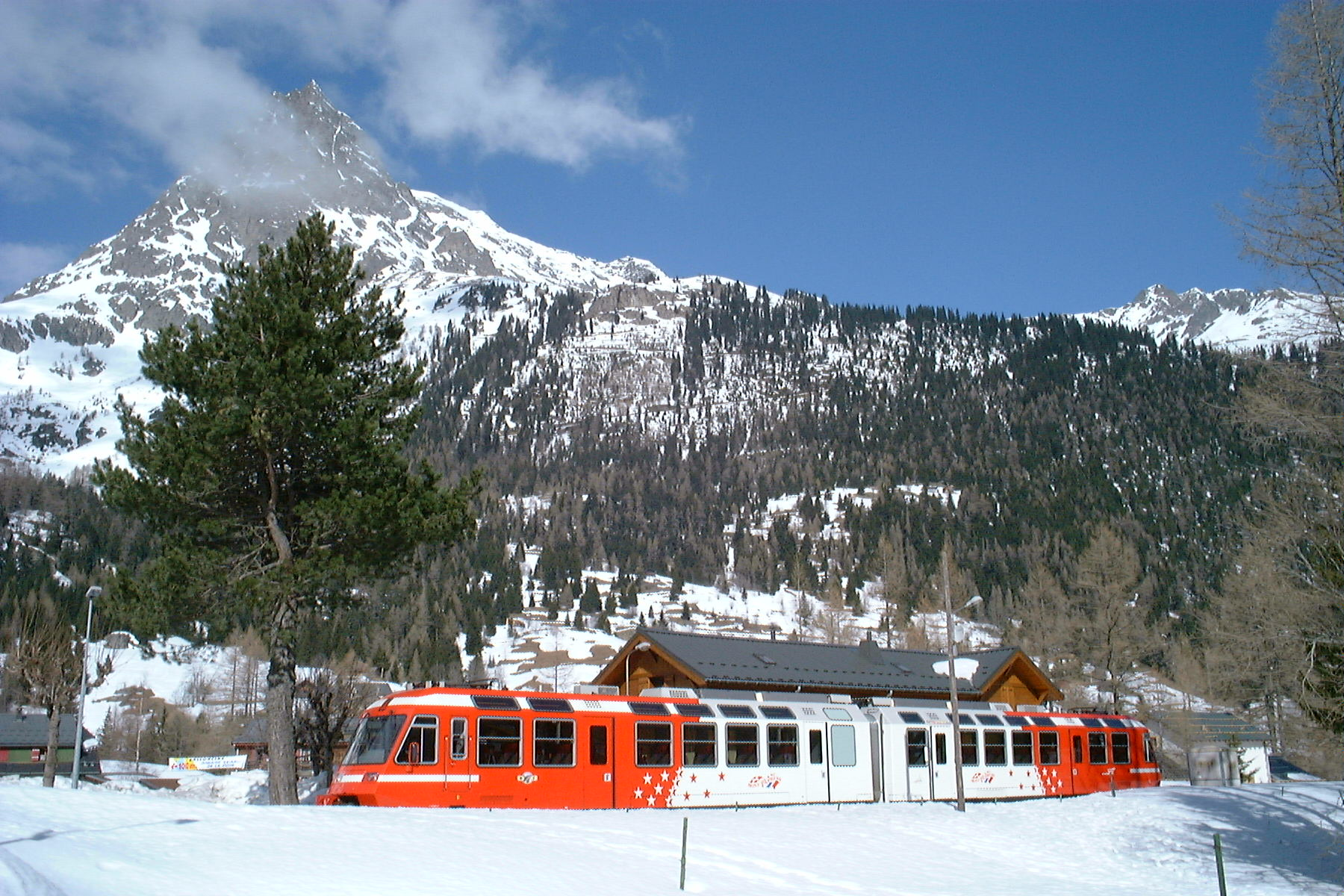
A SNCF Class Z 800 trainset at Le Buet station

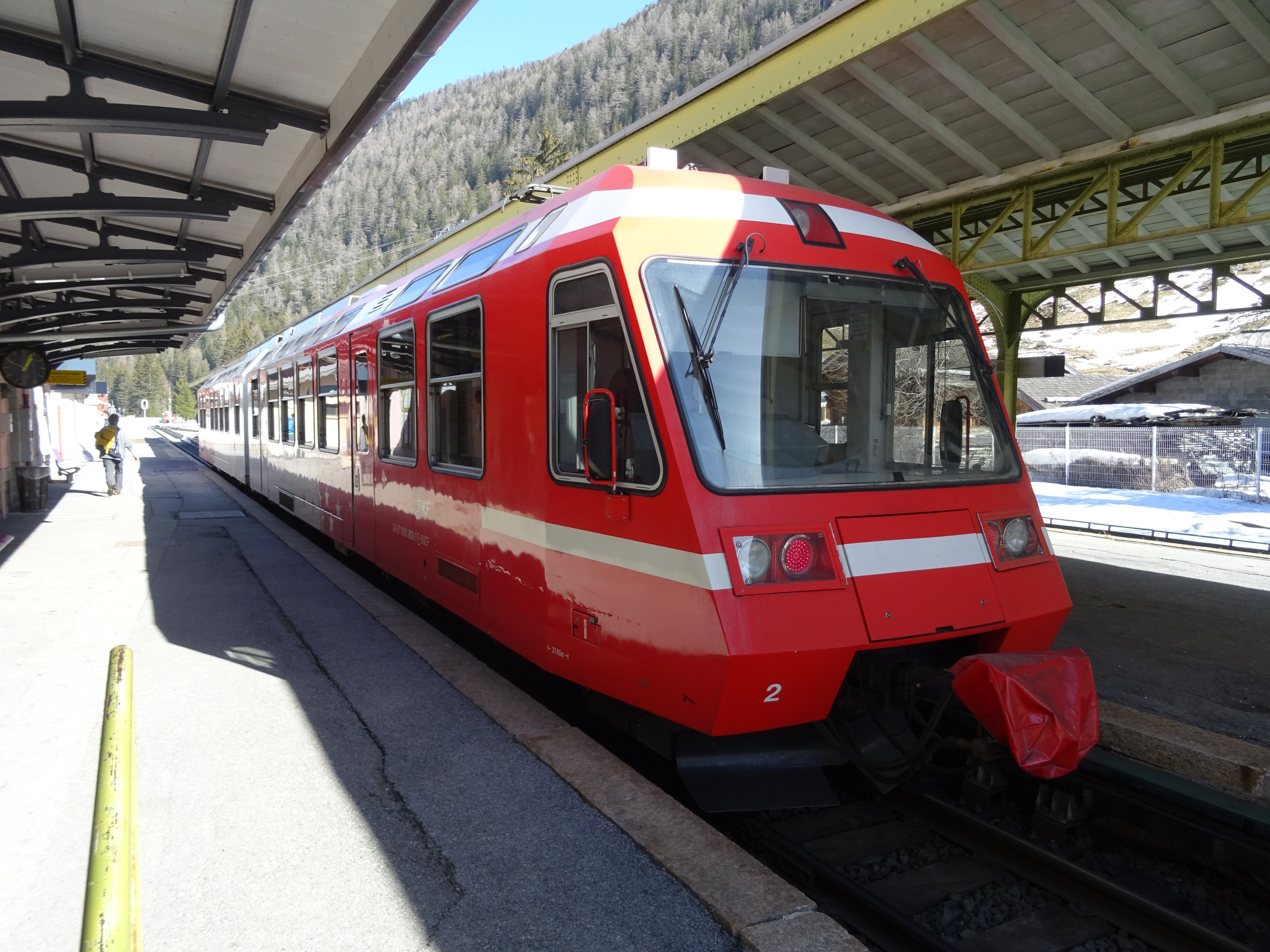
Z 800 at Vallorcine station

=== Le Buet ===
Within the commune is the small settlement of Le Buet, which also has its own railway station; it is the location of the spectacular Cascade de Bérard, which has a viewing gallery that enters the gorge of the main waterfall. Further up this valley is the Aiguilles Rouges National Nature Reserve and the Nature Reserve of Vallon de Bérard.

=== Skiing ===
The community was transformed in 2004 with the construction of a high-speed gondola lift which allowed access to the established Domaine de Balme and La Tour ski areas. This gave rise to the construction of a selection of restaurants and ski accommodation.

=== Émosson Dam ===
Although the Émosson Dam for hydroelectric power generation is physically just over the Swiss border, water from the reservoir crosses the border to first power the 189 MW Vallorcine Power Station just over the border in Vallorcine. Water is then sent through a headrace tunnel to the 162 MW La Bâtiaz Power Station, 12 kilometres (7 1/2 miles) to the east in Martigny, Switzerland. The drop between the dam and La Bâtiaz Power Station is 1,400 metres (4,600 feet).

== Climate ==
Climate data for Vallorcine (1991–2020 averages, 1958–2024 extremes): elevation 1326m
Month	Jan	Feb	Mar	Apr	May	Jun	Jul	Aug	Sep	Oct	Nov	Dec	Year
Record high °C (°F)	19.5 (67.1)	15.5 (59.9)	19.7 (67.5)	22.0 (71.6)	27.7 (81.9)	32.6 (90.7)	32.3 (90.1)	31.9 (89.4)	28.4 (83.1)	25.8 (78.4)	20.0 (68.0)	19.6 (67.3)	32.6 (90.7)
Mean daily maximum °C (°F)	2.3 (36.1)	3.3 (37.9)	7.0 (44.6)	10.9 (51.6)	15.2 (59.4)	19.2 (66.6)	21.0 (69.8)	20.5 (68.9)	16.3 (61.3)	12.4 (54.3)	6.3 (43.3)	2.9 (37.2)	11.4 (52.6)
Daily mean °C (°F)	−1.6 (29.1)	−1.1 (30.0)	2.2 (36.0)	5.8 (42.4)	9.9 (49.8)	13.6 (56.5)	15.4 (59.7)	15.1 (59.2)	11.3 (52.3)	7.8 (46.0)	2.5 (36.5)	−0.7 (30.7)	6.7 (44.0)
Mean daily minimum °C (°F)	−5.5 (22.1)	−5.5 (22.1)	−2.6 (27.3)	0.6 (33.1)	4.6 (40.3)	8.0 (46.4)	9.8 (49.6)	9.6 (49.3)	6.3 (43.3)	3.2 (37.8)	−1.4 (29.5)	−4.3 (24.3)	1.9 (35.4)
Record low °C (°F)	−24.5 (−12.1)	−23.3 (−9.9)	−24.2 (−11.6)	−13.7 (7.3)	−9.0 (15.8)	−3.0 (26.6)	−0.8 (30.6)	−1.0 (30.2)	−3.2 (26.2)	−10.0 (14.0)	−16.3 (2.7)	−20.2 (−4.4)	−24.5 (−12.1)
Average precipitation mm (inches)	176.7 (6.96)	133.0 (5.24)	120.1 (4.73)	91.9 (3.62)	120.4 (4.74)	113.3 (4.46)	130.2 (5.13)	133.5 (5.26)	98.1 (3.86)	117.9 (4.64)	118.9 (4.68)	182.5 (7.19)	1,536.5 (60.51)
Source: Meteociel

== Demography ==
Historical population
Year	Pop.	±% p.a.
1968	314	—
1975	283	−1.47%
1982	303	+0.98%
1990	329	+1.03%
1999	390	+1.91%
2007	416	+0.81%
2012	412	−0.19%
2017	400	−0.59%
2023	453	+2.10%
Source: INSEE

== See also ==
- Communes of the Haute-Savoie department
- Le Buet
- Lac d'Émosson
