= Vernayaz railway station =

Railway station in Vernayaz, Switzerland

Vernayaz
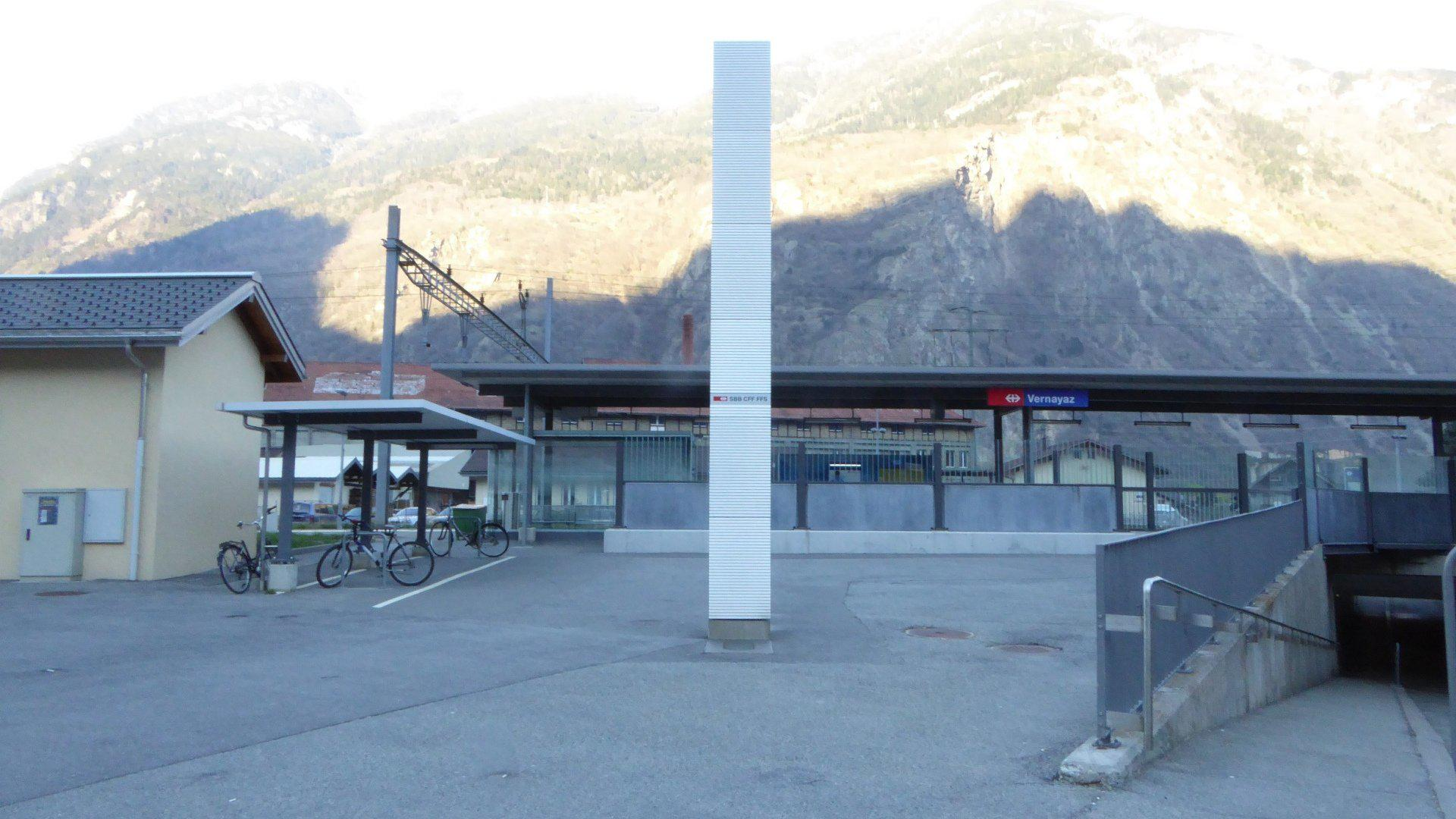
- The station platform in 2019

General information
- Location: Vernayaz; Switzerland
- Coordinates: 46°08′19″N 7°02′18″E
- Elevation: 452 m (1,483 ft)
- Owner: Swiss Federal Railways
- Line: Simplon line
- Distance: 61.5 km (38.2 mi) from Lausanne
- Platforms: 2 side platforms
- Tracks: 2
- Train operators: RegionAlps
- Connections: CarPostal SA bus line

Construction
- Parking: Yes (9 spaces)
- Cycle facilities: Yes (14 spaces)
- Accessible: Yes

Other information
- Station code: 8501405 (VERN)

Passengers
- 2023: 470 per weekday (RegionAlps)

Services
| Preceding station | RegionAlps | Following station |
|---|---|---|
| Evionnaz towards St-Gingolph | R91 | Martigny towards Brig |
| Evionnaz towards Monthey | R91 | Martigny towards Brig |
Location

Vernayaz railway station (French: Gare de Vernayaz, German: Bahnhof Vernayaz) is a railway station in the municipality of Vernayaz, in the Swiss canton of Valais. It is an intermediate stop on the Simplon line and is served by local trains only.

== Services ==
As of the December 2024 timetable change, the following services stop at Vernayaz:

- Regio: half-hourly service between Monthey and Brig, with every other train continuing from Monthey to St-Gingolph.
