= Trient Glacier =

Glacier situated in the Mont Blanc Massif

Coordinates: 45°59′36″N 7°1′43″E

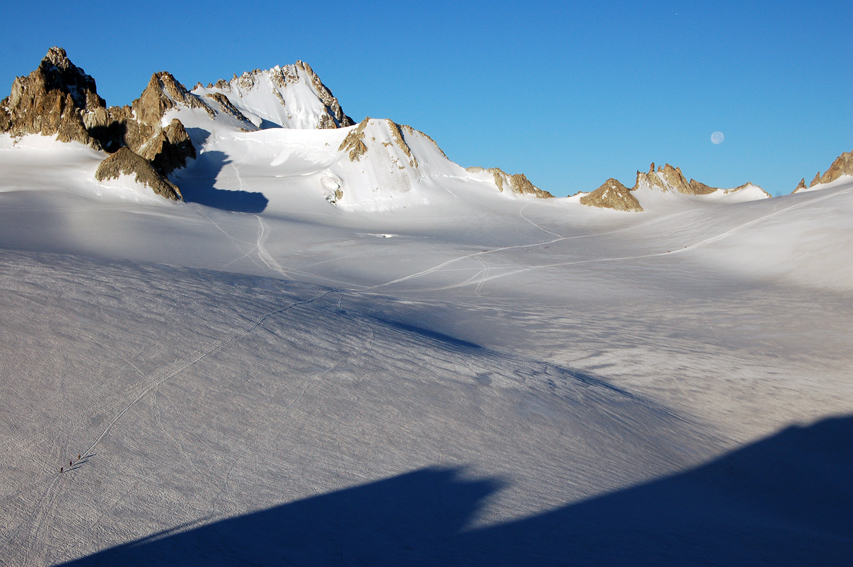
Trient Glacier

The Trient Glacier (French: Glacier du Trient) is a 4.3 km long glacier (2007) in the Mont Blanc Massif in the canton of Valais in Switzerland. In 1973 it had an area of 6.4 km².

The upper part of the glacier forms a large plateau named Plateau du Trient.

The glacier constitutes the source of the river Trient.

== See also ==
- List of glaciers in Switzerland
- List of glaciers
- Retreat of glaciers since 1850
- Swiss Alps
