= Trient (river) =

River in Switzerland

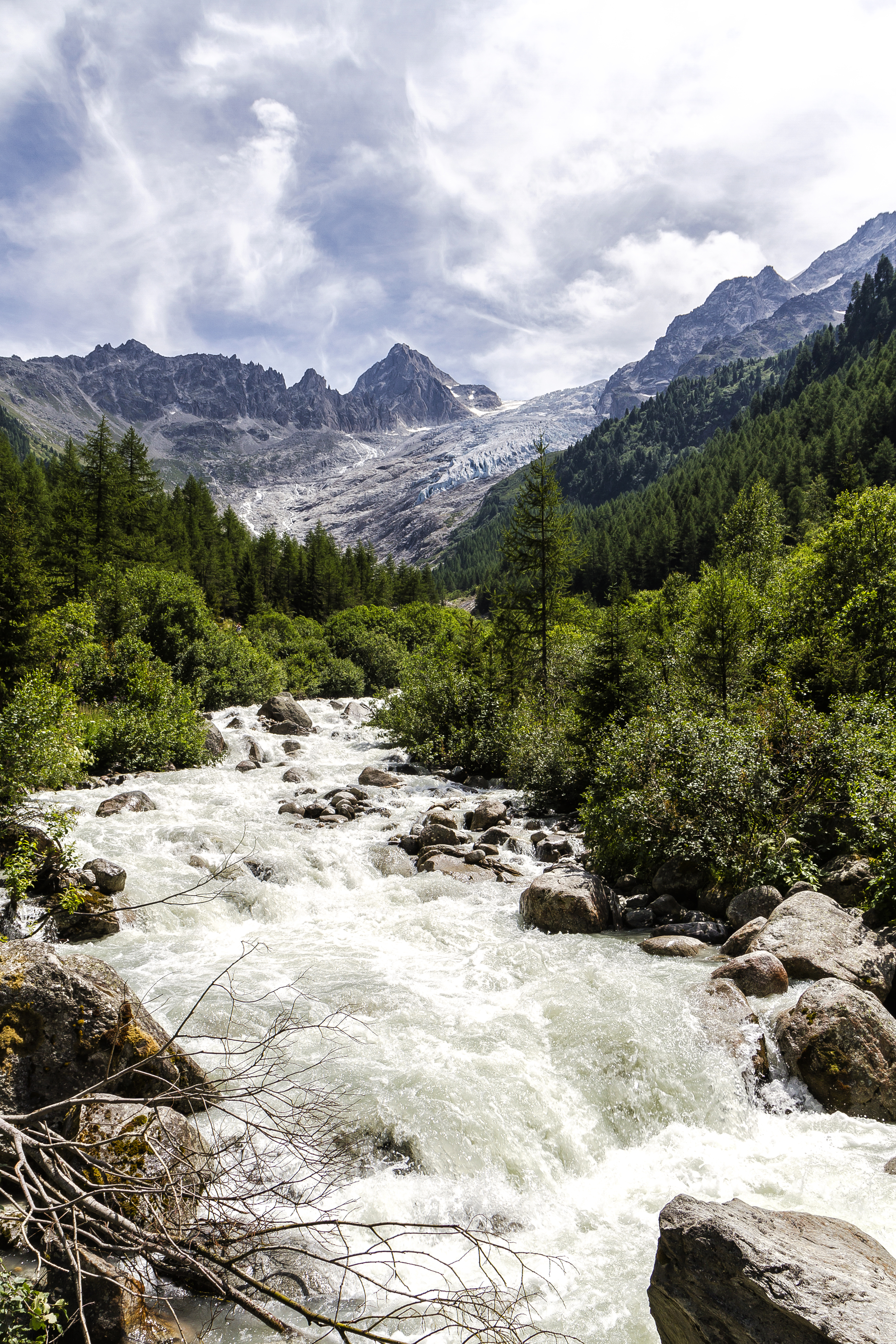
- Head of the Trient valley and Trient Glacier
- Native name: Le Trient (French)

Location
- Country: Switzerland
- Canton: Valais
- Settlements: Trient, Vernayaz

Physical characteristics
- Source: Trient Glacier
  - location: Trient
  - coordinates: 46°00′50″N 07°01′46″E
  - elevation: 2,500 m (8,200 ft)
- Mouth
  - location: Rhone between Vernayaz and Martigny, Valais
  - coordinates: 46°08′16″N 07°03′05″E
  - elevation: 450 m (1,480 ft)

Basin features
- Progression: Rhône→ Mediterranean Sea

The Trient (French pronunciation: [tʁiɛ̃]) is a river in western Valais. It takes its source at the Trient Glacier in the Mont Blanc Massif and joins the Rhone between Vernayaz and Martigny. Only two villages are located along the Trient: Trient and Vernayaz. However, the Trient Valley includes many other settlements: notably Finhaut, Les Marécottes and Salvan, all located on south-east facing terraces, at significant elevations above the valley floor.

The Trient is essentially a wild alpine river mostly fed by glacial runoff. High in the Alps it is fed by numerous small streams that run down the surrounding mountains. Notable streams are the Eau Noire (collecting the Barberine below the Lac d'Emosson) and the Triège. Shortly after passing the Trient Gorges, the river flows into the Rhone just south-east of the village of Vernayaz.

== See also ==
- List of rivers of Switzerland
