= Vallorcine station =

Railway station in Vallorcine, France

Vallorcine
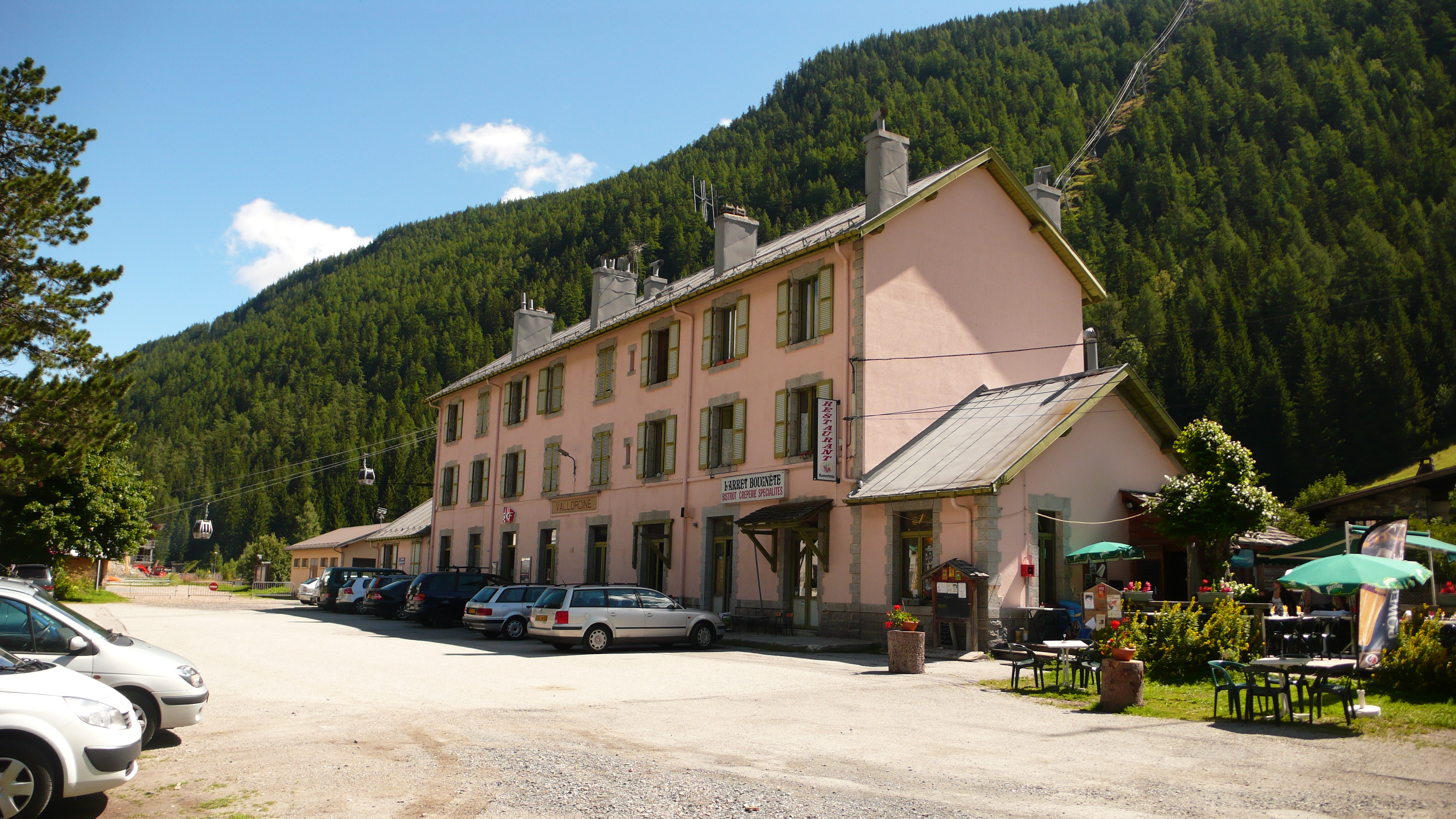
- The station building in 2008

General information
- Location: Vallorcine; France
- Coordinates: 46°01′57″N 6°55′58″E
- Elevation: 1,261 m (4,137 ft)
- Owner: SNCF
- Line: Saint-Gervais–Vallorcine line
- Distance: 34.1 km (21.2 mi) from Saint-Gervais-les-Bains-Le Fayet
- Platforms: 2 (1 island platform)
- Tracks: 2
- Train operators: TER Auvergne-Rhône-Alpes; Transports de Martigny et Régions

Other information
- Station code: 87746875

Passengers
- 2023: 39,986 (SNCF)

Services
Preceding station	TER Auvergne-Rhône-Alpes	Following station
Le Buet towards Saint-Gervais	44	Terminus
Preceding station	Transports de Martigny et Régions	Following station
Terminus	Regio Mont-Blanc Express	Le Châtelard-Frontière towards Martigny
Location

Vallorcine station (French: Gare de Vallorcine) is a railway station in the commune of Vallorcine, in the French department of Haute-Savoie. It is located on the 1,000 mm (3 ft 3 3/8 in) gauge Saint-Gervais–Vallorcine line of SNCF. The station is the last one in France before the line crosses into Switzerland.

== Services ==
As of the December 2023 timetable change, the following services stop at Vallorcine:

- TER Auvergne-Rhône-Alpes: hourly service to Saint-Gervais-les-Bains-Le Fayet.
- Regio Mont-Blanc Express: hourly service to Martigny.
