= Martigny–Châtelard Railway =

Narrow gauge railway line in canton of Valais, Switzerland

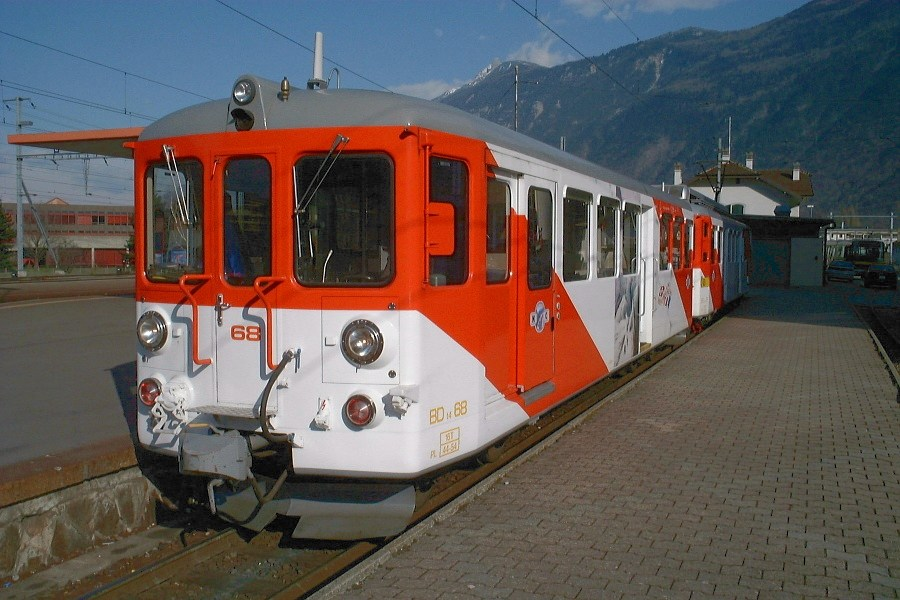

Overview
- Locale: Valais

Service
- Type: Part rack railway

Technical
- Line length: 19 km (11.8 mi)
- Rack system: Strub
- Track gauge: 1,000 mm (3 ft 3 3/8 in) metre gauge
- Electrification: 850 V DC Overhead line (3rd rail on rack sections)
- Maximum incline: adhesion 7% Rack 20%

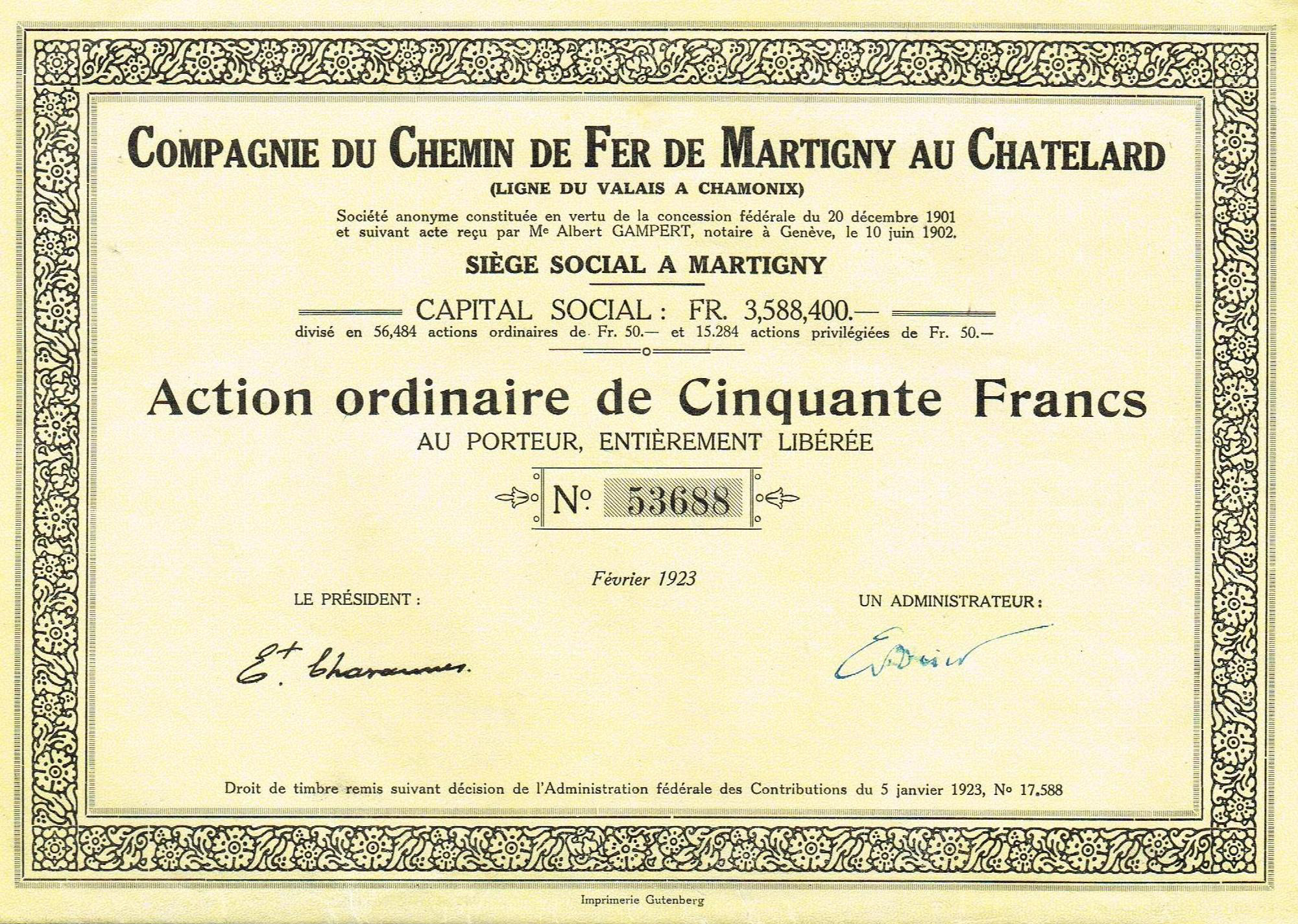
Share of the Compagnie du Chemin de fer de Martigny au Châtelard, issued February 1923

The Martigny–Châtelard Railway, abbreviated MC, French Chemins de fer Martigny–Châtelard, is a 19 km (11.8 mi) 1,000 mm (3 ft 3 3/8 in) metre gauge rack railway in the canton of Valais, Switzerland. The transport company "Chemin de fer de Martigny–Châtelard" merged in 2001, the resulting Transports de Martigny et Régions now markets this line and the connecting Saint-Gervais–Vallorcine railway as Mont-Blanc Express.

== Contact with the other networks ==
- At Martigny it connects with the Lausanne–Brig line of the Swiss Federal Railways
- At Le Châtelard (Finhaut) it connects with the Saint-Gervais–Vallorcine railway which in turn joins the standard gauge SNCF at Le Fayet station of Saint-Gervais-les-Bains. However the 3 km (1.86 mi) between Le Châtelard and Vallorcine is operated by the Chemin de Fer de Martigny au Châtelard.

== Rolling stock ==
- 2 Z 800 105-seater electric multiple units, delivered in 1997 (???) by ADTranz and Vevey Technologies, in the context of a joint purchase with the Ligne de Saint Gervais - Vallorcine. This 1000 kW stock, composed of two motorcars, could run at 70 km/h (43.5 mph); it is equipped with a rack and pinion system and pantographs (in addition to the third rail collector shoe), so that it could perform direct runs to Vallorcine and beyond without the need to change trains.

== Merger with MO ==
This transport company merged 2001 with the Martigny–Orsières Railway and is now known as "Transports de Martigny et Régions".

== See also ==
- List of mountain railways in Switzerland
