= Bovernier railway station =

Railway station in Bovernier, Switzerland

Bovernier
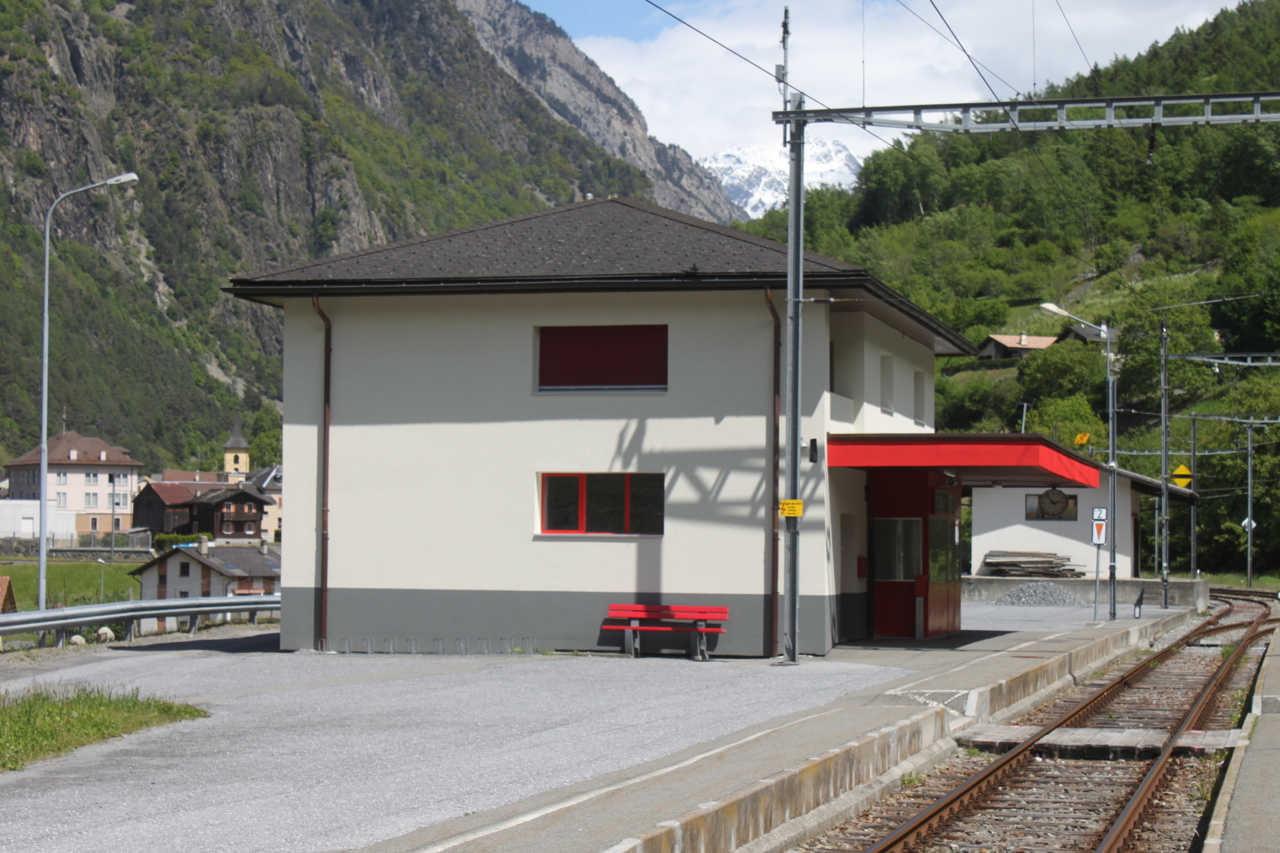
- The station in 2014

General information
- Location: Bovernier; Switzerland
- Coordinates: 46°04′43″N 7°04′56″E
- Elevation: 613 m (2,011 ft)
- Owner: Transports de Martigny et Régions
- Line: Martigny–Orsières line
- Distance: 7.8 km (4.8 mi) from Martigny
- Platforms: 2 side platforms
- Tracks: 2
- Train operators: RegionAlps

Construction
- Accessible: Yes

Other information
- Station code: 8501575 (BOVE)

Services
Preceding station	RegionAlps	Following station
Martigny-Croix towards Martigny	R81	Sembrancher towards Le Châble VS
Preceding station	SBB CFF FFS	Following station
Martigny-Croix One-way operation	VosAlpes Express	Sembrancher towards Le Châble VS
Location

Bovernier railway station (French: Gare de Bovernier) is a railway station in the municipality of Bovernier, in the Swiss canton of Valais. It is an intermediate stop and a request stop on the standard gauge Martigny–Orsières line of Transports de Martigny et Régions.

== Services ==
As of the December 2023 timetable change, the following services stop at Bovernier:

- Regio: hourly service between Martigny and Le Châble VS.
- VosAlpes Express: daily direct service to Le Châble VS on weekends between December and April.
