= Martigny-Croix railway station =

Railway station in Martigny, Switzerland

Martigny-Croix
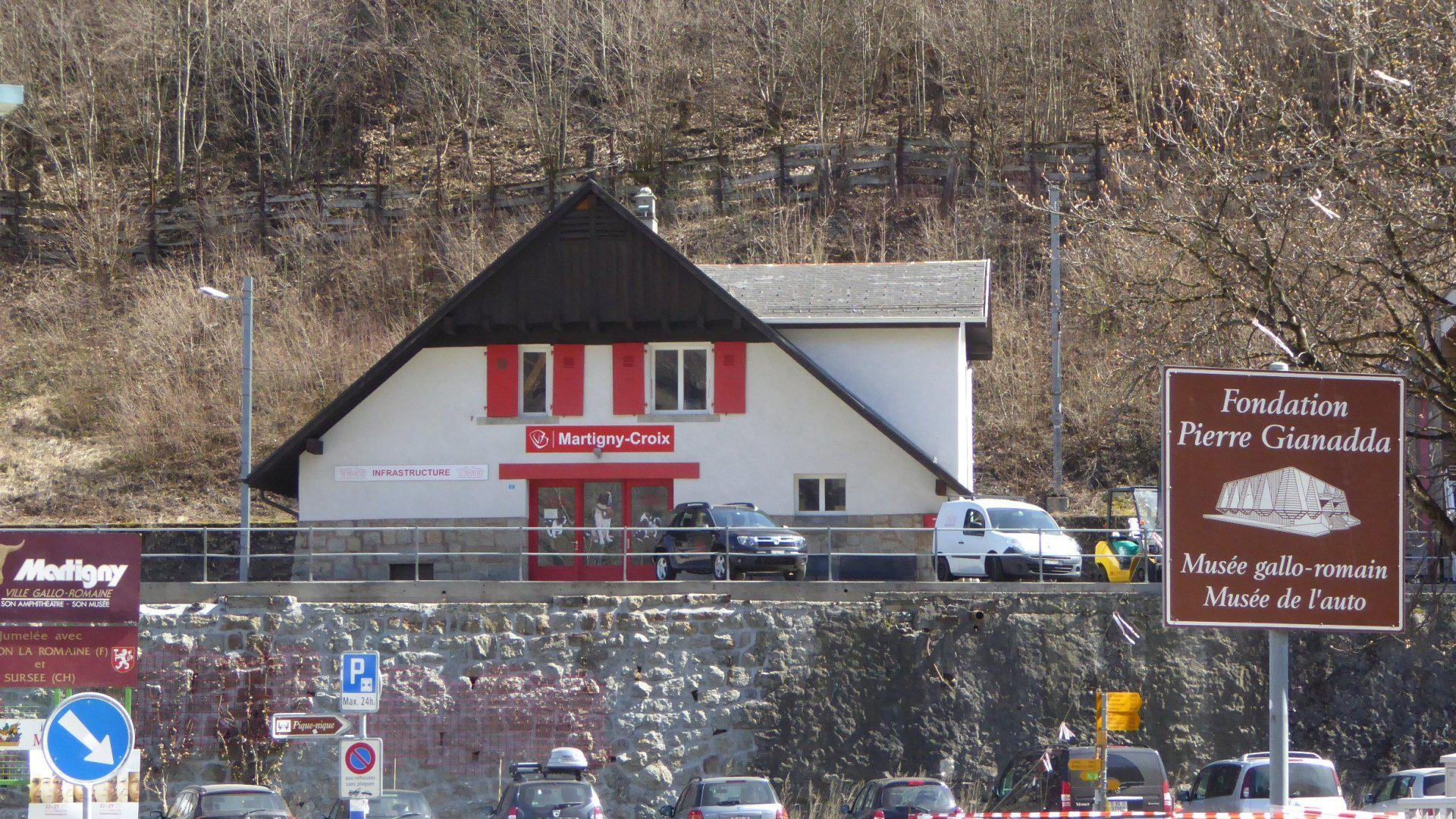
- The station in 2019

General information
- Location: Martigny; Switzerland
- Coordinates: 46°05′12″N 7°03′31″E
- Elevation: 503 m (1,650 ft)
- Owner: Transports de Martigny et Régions
- Line: Martigny–Orsières line
- Distance: 4.1 km (2.5 mi) from Martigny
- Platforms: 1 side platform
- Tracks: 1
- Train operators: RegionAlps

Construction
- Accessible: Yes

Other information
- Station code: 8501573 (MACR)

Services
Preceding station	RegionAlps	Following station
Martigny-Bourg towards Martigny	R81	Bovernier towards Le Châble VS
Preceding station	SBB CFF FFS	Following station
Martigny-Bourg One-way operation	VosAlpes Express	Bovernier towards Le Châble VS
Location

Martigny-Croix railway station (French: Gare de Martigny-Croix) is a railway station in the municipality of Martigny, in the Swiss canton of Valais. It is an intermediate stop and a request stop on the standard gauge Martigny–Orsières line of Transports de Martigny et Régions.

== Services ==
As of the December 2023 timetable change, the following services stop at Martigny-Croix:

- Regio: hourly service between Martigny and Le Châble VS.
- VosAlpes Express: daily direct service to Le Châble VS on weekends between December and April.
