= Etiez railway station =

Railway station in Val de Bagnes, Switzerland

Etiez
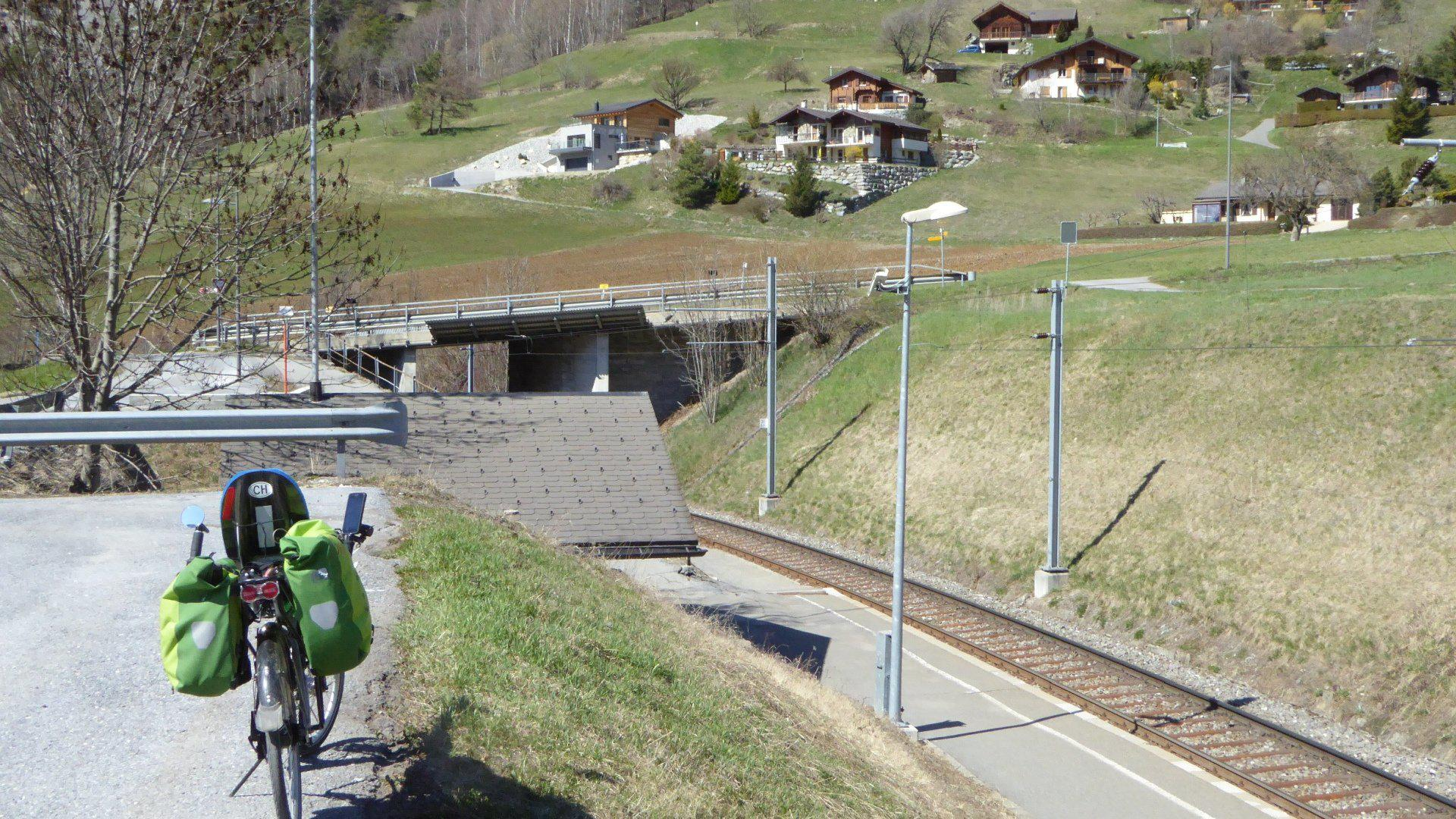
- The station in 2019

General information
- Location: Val de Bagnes; Switzerland
- Coordinates: 46°04′58″N 7°09′46″E
- Elevation: 756 m (2,480 ft)
- Owner: Transports de Martigny et Régions
- Line: Martigny–Orsières line
- Distance: 14.8 km (9.2 mi) from Martigny
- Platforms: 1 side platform
- Tracks: 1
- Train operators: RegionAlps
- Connections: TMR bus lines

Construction
- Accessible: Yes

Other information
- Station code: 8501580 (ETIE)

Services
Preceding station	RegionAlps	Following station
Sembrancher towards Martigny	R81	Le Châble VS Terminus
Preceding station	SBB CFF FFS	Following station
Sembrancher One-way operation	VosAlpes Express	Le Châble VS Terminus
Location

Etiez railway station (French: Gare d'Etiez) is a railway station in the municipality of Val de Bagnes, in the Swiss canton of Valais. It is an intermediate stop and a request stop on the standard gauge Martigny–Orsières line of Transports de Martigny et Régions.

== Services ==
As of the December 2023 timetable change, the following services stop at Etiez:

- Regio: hourly service between Martigny and Le Châble VS.
- VosAlpes Express: daily direct service to Le Châble VS on weekends between December and April.
