= Martigny-Bourg railway station =

Railway station in Martigny, Switzerland

Martigny-Bourg
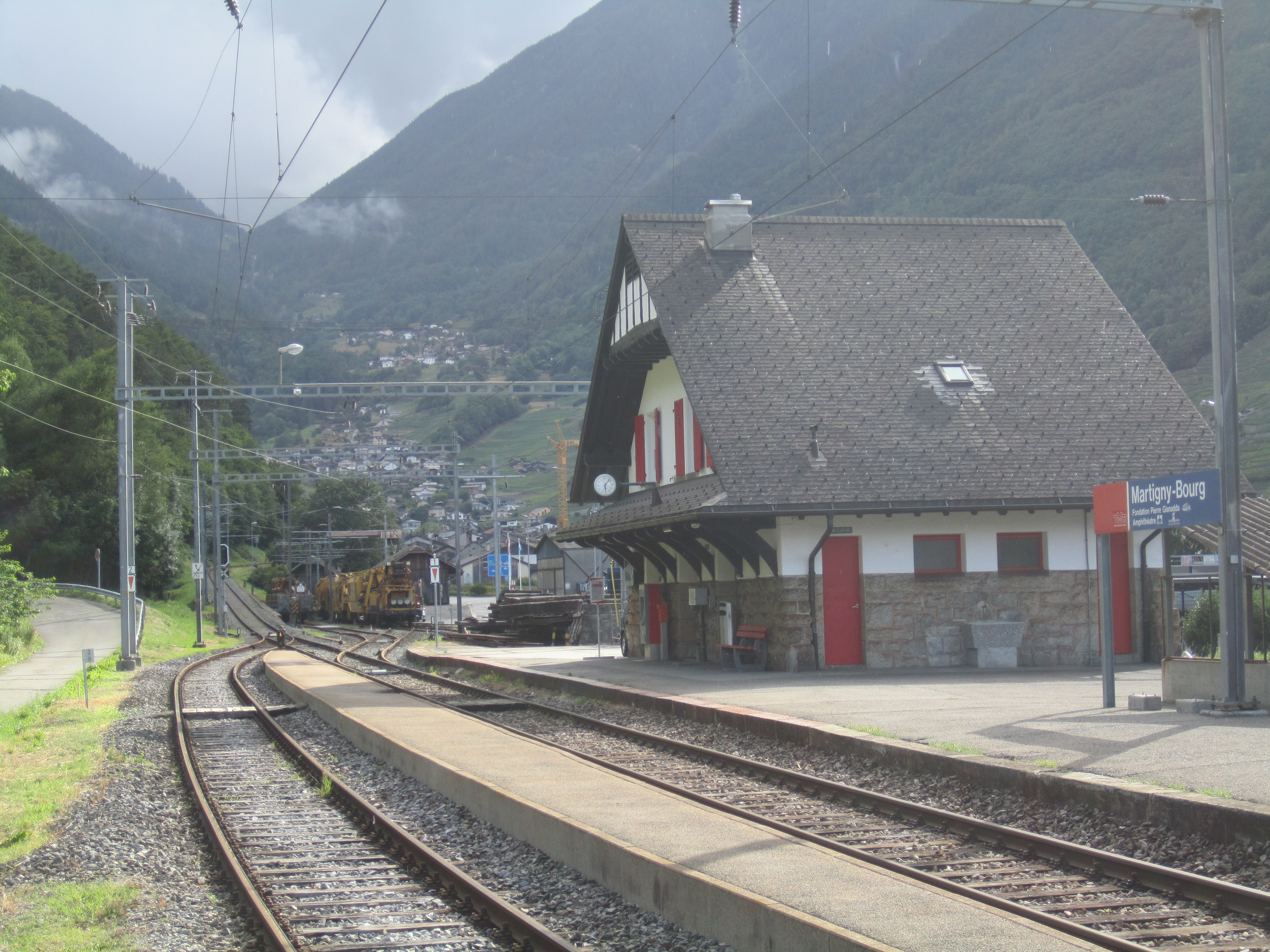
- The station in 2014

General information
- Location: Martigny; Switzerland
- Coordinates: 46°05′36″N 7°04′13″E
- Elevation: 484 m (1,588 ft)
- Owner: Transports de Martigny et Régions
- Line: Martigny–Orsières line
- Distance: 2.9 km (1.8 mi) from Martigny
- Platforms: 2 side platforms
- Tracks: 2
- Train operators: RegionAlps

Construction
- Accessible: Yes

Other information
- Station code: 8501378 (MABO)

Services
Preceding station	RegionAlps	Following station
Martigny Terminus	R81	Martigny-Croix towards Le Châble VS
Preceding station	SBB CFF FFS	Following station
Martigny One-way operation	VosAlpes Express	Martigny-Croix towards Le Châble VS
Location

Martigny-Bourg railway station (French: Gare de Martigny-Bourg) is a railway station in the municipality of Martigny, in the Swiss canton of Valais. It is an intermediate stop and a request stop on the standard gauge Martigny–Orsières line of Transports de Martigny et Régions.

== Services ==
As of the December 2023 timetable change, the following services stop at Martigny-Bourg:

- Regio: hourly service between Martigny and Le Châble VS.
- VosAlpes Express: daily direct service to Le Châble VS on weekends between December and April.
