= La Douay railway station =

Railway station in Orsières, Switzerland

La Douay
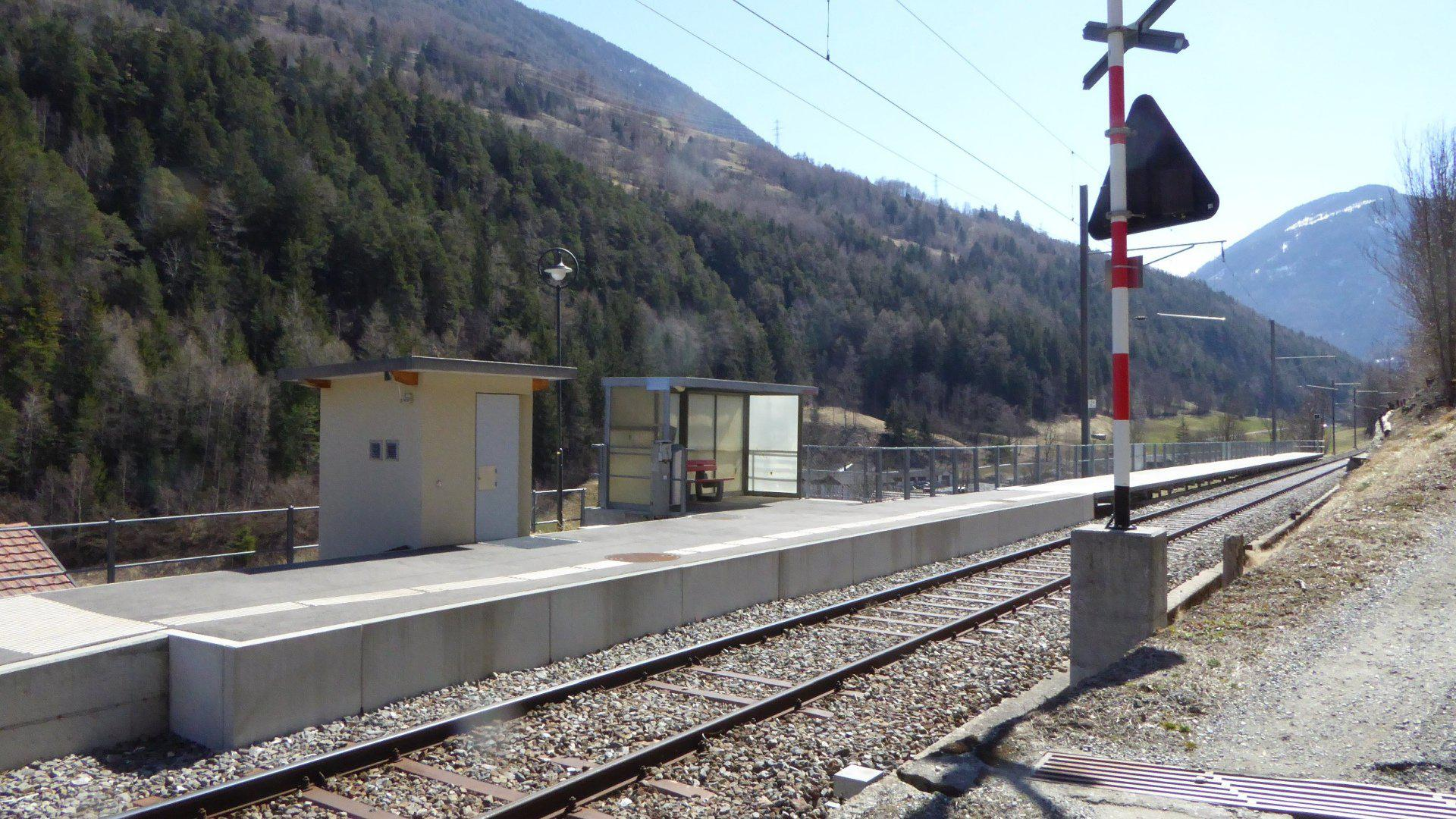
- The station in 2019

General information
- Location: Orsières; Switzerland
- Coordinates: 46°03′09″N 7°08′55″E
- Elevation: 818 m (2,684 ft)
- Owner: Transports de Martigny et Régions
- Line: Martigny–Orsières line
- Distance: 16.5 km (10.3 mi) from Martigny
- Platforms: 1 side platform
- Tracks: 1
- Train operators: RegionAlps

Construction
- Accessible: Yes

Other information
- Station code: 8501577 (DOUY)

Services
Preceding station	RegionAlps	Following station
Sembrancher Terminus	R82	Orsières Terminus
Location

La Douay railway station (French: Gare de La Douay) is a railway station in the municipality of Orsières, in the Swiss canton of Valais. It is located on the standard gauge Martigny–Orsières line of Transports de Martigny et Régions.

== Services ==
As of the December 2023 timetable change, the following services stop at La Douay:

- Regio: hourly service between Sembrancher and Orsières.
