= Top Gear races =

Forms of racing in the BBC motoring show

In Top Gear, a BBC motoring show, one of the show's regular features since 2002 is various forms of racing the presenters undertake, either against each other or against invited guests. The show has featured a number of epic races, where one of the presenters — Jeremy Clarkson, Richard Hammond, James May, and occasionally The Stig — drives a car in a race against the others in another form of transport. These races typically involve Clarkson driving the car while Hammond and May take the same journey by combinations of plane, train, or ferry. May has said that the races are planned to be as close as possible. Of the long-distance races so far, the car has won the vast majority of the races, with the exceptions of the cross-London epic, in which the car was beaten by a bicycle, a boat on the Thames and public transport; Ferrari Daytona vs. Powerboat, in which the boat won; Shelby Mustang GT500 vs. High Speed Train, in which the train won; and the Arabian Peninsula race, in which the alternative 'money no-object' transportation options beat the Bugatti Chiron.

== Races ==
=== Aston Martin DB9 vs. French TGV – distance 900 miles ===
Series Four, Episode One (9 May 2004)

To prove what was the fastest way to get to the South of France for a summer holiday, Clarkson drove an Aston Martin DB9 from the studio in Dunsfold, Surrey to Monte Carlo, against Hammond and May who took the Eurostar and the French TGV. Hammond and May began by walking two miles to a nearby bus stop, and were confident that it would be "impossible" for the car to win once they boarded their sequence of trains. That being said, Clarkson did manage to build a substantial early lead, covering 40 miles in the DB9 by the time Hammond and May had even reached their bus stop and, despite encountering heavy traffic on the outskirts of Dover, Clarkson managed to make the 10:00am ferry to Calais. By this point, Hammond and May's bus had only just arrived at Guildford railway station, and when their South West Trains service to London Waterloo arrived just over an hour later, Clarkson had already disembarked in Calais. Despite changing to the substantially faster Eurostar at Waterloo station, Clarkson managed to maintain a significant lead; by the time Hammond and May reached Gare du Nord, Clarkson was already south of Troyes and heading towards Dijon, 172 miles ahead of them, and they had just 50 minutes to cross the entire city to catch their TGV connection to Nice. Despite Clarkson making distracting phone-calls to try and slow them down, they successfully took the RER to Gare de Lyon from where they just managed to make their connection to the French TGV which would take them all the way to Nice. Once they were settled in on their train, May compared the contest to the earlier Blue Train Races, won by a Rover Light Six and Bentley Speed Six against Le Train Bleu or The Blue Train.

At this point, however, the race turned. Despite Clarkson covering far more distance in the time he'd taken than either Hammond or May were anticipating, the TGV's significantly faster speeds, allied to the car being hampered by the French speed limits, meant that Hammond and May took the lead for the first time in the race just south of Valence with just 200 miles to go. However, the train's journey had to take Hammond and May first down to Marseille and then along the coastline to Nice. Not only was this a much further distance to travel than Clarkson had to cover in the car which could drive straight to Monte Carlo, but the train had to slow down to accommodate the bends of the coastline. Moreover, because of the DB9 doing an impressive 19 miles per gallon throughout the race, Clarkson would not have to lose any more time stopping for fuel. When Hammond and May arrived in Nice, despite being only 15 miles from Monte Carlo, they had to make another train change to get there, and it was likely whilst they were on this train that Clarkson managed to re-take the lead. He reached the finishing point at the Café de Paris well before his co-presenters, and had even had time to order several drinks and some food before Hammond and May arrived, looking distinctly dishevelled from having run all the way from the train station. Winner: Car

DVD release: This race was released as part of the Top Gear: Revved Up: Thrashing, Crashing and Trashing DVD, where the race was shown in its entirety and with no breaks.

=== Ferrari 612 Scaglietti vs. passenger jet – distance 650 miles ===
Series Five, Episode Eight (19 December 2004)

In what proved to be one of the closest Top Gear long-distance races ever staged, Clarkson tried to beat Hammond and May in a race from the studio in Dunsfold, Surrey to Verbier, Switzerland to find out the quickest way to get to the Alps for a skiing holiday. Clarkson drove a Ferrari 612 Scaglietti, whilst Hammond and May used public transport, chiefly using a plane to get from Heathrow to Geneva. Setting off at 5:30am, Hammond and May began by walking to a local bus stop, where they had to wait for over an hour before their bus to Guildford arrived. They then took a train to Woking and a RailAir coach to Heathrow Airport. Clarkson meanwhile drove to Dover to catch the ferry to France, and not only managed to leave English soil before Hammond and May had even reached the airport, but by the time Hammond and May did arrive at Heathrow, Clarkson had already disembarked in Calais. However, after a 90-minute check-in, Hammond and May finally boarded their plane whilst Clarkson had only covered 100 miles since docking, far less than he had been hoping to achieve. Indeed, the plane actually arrived in Geneva early, so by the time Hammond and May had got off the plane, Clarkson was still only halfway between Paris and Dijon, about 250 miles behind. This huge deficit, coupled with the fact that Hammond and May were about to transfer onto the extremely efficient Swiss public transport network, made Clarkson start to appreciate the enormity of the task ahead of him and that his chances of winning were almost nil. Clarkson then encountered a contraflow when he was still around two hours away from the Swiss border, which slowed him even further. To make matters even worse, he was stopped by the police just south of Dijon for speeding, which cost him a further 25 minutes as well as a £60 fine.

Whilst Clarkson was talking to the police, Hammond and May were already on their train from Geneva to Martigny. However, this much slower mode of transport allowed Clarkson to start closing the gap, and, by taking advantage of encountering very little traffic after being stopped by the police, Clarkson and the car had more than halved the distance by the time Hammond and May arrived at Martigny. Hammond and May were also forced to wait for a whole hour for their next train, so when they did finally leave Martigny station for Le Châble an hour later, Clarkson had managed to reach the Swiss border. He continued to close the gap so much that he was just 40 miles behind Hammond and May when they reached Le Châble where they boarded their final mode of public transport: a coach ride up 12 miles of mountain road from Le Châble to Verbier. When they arrived at the Verbier bus depot, Hammond and May had to continue their journey on foot, but having caught up on the mountain road, Clarkson drove right past them on the main street of Verbier, barely a few hundred yards away from the finishing point, prompting May to hurl his suitcase after the car in disgust. When Hammond and May eventually reached the finishing point at Lodge Hotel where Clarkson was waiting for them, beer in hand, all three presenters were in total disbelief at how close the race had been, with Clarkson expressing his opinion that no-one would believe that it was "for real". Winner: Car

DVD release: This race was released as part of the Top Gear: The Races and Winter Blunderland DVDs, albeit in a truncated form. It was a never included in a commercial release.

=== Mercedes-Benz SLR McLaren vs. cruise ferry – distance 1320 miles ===
Series Six, Episode Six (3 July 2005)

In what is still the longest Top Gear race in terms of both time and distance, Clarkson in a Mercedes-Benz SLR McLaren (a car that had been featured in both Series Three and Series Four, including setting the lap-record round the Top Gear track) raced Hammond and May from Heathrow Airport to Oslo, Norway. With the car having so far beaten a train and a plane, Hammond and May decided to use a Cruise Ferry as their primary mode of public transport. Before setting off, May did admit that he had every confidence in the car being able to beat the boat, but thought that the physical toll of driving the huge distance would be too much for Clarkson. Whilst Hammond and May would still be moving whilst they were sleeping, Clarkson would have to stop at some point to rest. Hammond and May's route would involve taking a flight from Heathrow to Newcastle, before taking a 17-hour long ferry journey across the North Sea to Kristiansand, Norway and would then use a powerboat to cover the short remaining distance to reach the finishing point in Oslo. Clarkson's journey meanwhile would take him through the UK, France, Belgium, the Netherlands, Germany, Denmark, Sweden and Norway, covering a distance of well over 1,300 miles (about 2,100 km).

With the race starting at midday from Heathrow's car park, Hammond and May were able to check in straight away, but the time of their flight meant that Clarkson was able to reach the Channel Tunnel before their plane actually left the runway. However, Clarkson discovered that the 1:30pm train his car was booked on "didn't exist" - whereas Hammond and May presumed that he must have missed it - and so was still stuck in Folkestone by the time Hammond and May had left Newcastle Airport, from where they got on a bus to connect to Newcastle's ferry terminal. Clarkson's journey had been so delayed that by the time he arrived in Calais, Hammond and May's ferry had already departed from Newcastle harbour. Although Clarkson was able to travel through France and Belgium without any difficulty, he encountered appalling rush-hour traffic as he entered The Netherlands, and so he had to work out a new, longer route across the north of the country that avoided the traffic jams. However, as he was crossing the Afsluitdijk, with still over 830 miles to go, Hammond and May's ferry was nearly half-way through its entire journey to Kristiansand. Despite this deficit, he remained confident that any time he had lost in Holland he would be able to make up on Germany's Autobahns, many of which had no mandated speed limits. Indeed, by being able to hit speeds upwards of 160 miles per hour (257 km/h), he took the lead in the race and was able to reach the Danish border just as Hammond and May's ferry was entering the last third of its journey. Even with the significant delays at Folkestone and the traffic in Holland, he had covered 650 miles in 12 hours, but as midnight came and went, Clarkson's tiredness began to kick in. Despite stopping at several petrol stations for coffee, he eventually decided to pull over at a service station just outside Copenhagen and went to sleep in the car.

By the following morning, Clarkson's lead had gone owing to the ferry continuing its journey overnight, and by the time the car had crossed over into Sweden at around 9:00am, the ferry was docking in Kristiansand. After a short bus journey, Hammond and May then transferred to a powerboat which would take them round the southern coast of Norway all the way to Oslo, and with such a short distance to cover, they were certain that victory would be theirs. When Clarkson heard May on the phone tell him what form of transport they were using, he likewise thought that the result was beyond doubt. However, disaster struck Hammond and May as, around a quarter of the way into their journey from Kristiansand to Oslo, the engine on their speedboat burnt out, meaning they had to change to the back-up chase boat. This changeover coupled with the extremely rough seas meant that Clarkson was able to close the gap as he entered Norway. However, Clarkson once again encountered slow moving traffic on the Norwegian border, with the roads being predominantly single carriageways all the way to Oslo. Although the rough seas had made Hammond sea-sick, slowing the boat's progress, the knowledge that Clarkson was just 50 miles away from the finishing point - meaning that they were virtually neck-and-neck - made Hammond and May decide to go for broke and increased their speed again, thinking that lightning couldn't strike twice, but the boat's rib burst, meaning that they had to find the nearest point of dry land as soon as possible. They had to land in an unknown town (Stavern, in Larvik), and because the locals spoke no English and the two presenters had little knowledge of the local currency, it took them the rest of the day to find a bus and get to the destination. Clarkson won the race, flew back to England, and was halfway through supper before Hammond and May called to say they had arrived at the finishing point. Back in the studio, however, Clarkson did make the point that the victory was a slightly hollow one because of the physical toll the 24-hour long journey took on him. Winner: Car

DVD release: This race was released as part of the Top Gear: The Races DVD, albeit in a truncated form, with a running time of 12 minutes. It was never included in a commercial release.

=== Bugatti Veyron vs. Cessna 182 – distance 813 miles ===
Series Seven, Episode Five (11 December 2005)

Clarkson (in a Bugatti Veyron) raced Hammond and May (in a Cessna 182) from Alba to the restaurant on the 42nd floor of Tower 42 in London to deliver a truffle. The main difference in premise between this race and previous iterations was that, with James May having become a trained pilot since the Series 5 race to Verbier, Hammond and May would be using a private plane, meaning they would not have to suffer queuing or check-in, saving them a huge amount of time; as a result, both presenters felt extremely confident of victory. Clarkson however was putting his faith in the Veyron's immense power and speed which, at the time, were completely unmatched by any other production car. Hammond and May's planned route would take them from Alba to the local airport in Cuneo, where May would then fly his plane to London, from where they would get a sequence of trains and buses to reach the finishing point. Clarkson, meanwhile, would have to drive round Turin during the morning rush-hour, through the Mont Blanc Tunnel, briefly into Switzerland via Geneva, back into France towards Dijon and then onto Calais, where he would use the Channel Tunnel crossing before heading straight for London.

Hammond and May began by riding scooters to the local airport at Cuneo, where Hammond was slightly dismayed to see that the plane they'd be using looked "like something a builder would leave behind", remarking over the phone to Clarkson that he thought the 182 in the plane's name referred to the "number of quid it cost". Hammond was further disappointed to hear that, despite it being a private plane, May had to do several pre-flight checks to ensure that it was safe to fly. Indeed, the pre-flight checks took so long that by the time Hammond and May finally left the ground, Clarkson had already passed Turin and was entering the Mont Blanc Tunnel. Moreover, when Hammond noticed that he could see the sea, May explained that the plane could not simply fly directly to London but had to fly via the French Riviera since the aircraft was not equipped to fly over mountains above 10,000 feet — in this case, the Swiss Alps — and so Clarkson's lead was growing exponentially. Much to Hammond's annoyance, May then revealed that the plane would then have to stop at Saint-Étienne–Bouthéon Airport in order to refuel, meaning that when Clarkson was in sight of Dijon, he had a lead of around 150 miles.

Clarkson at this point was so sure of victory that he started taking coffee breaks and playing games to amuse himself, such as trying to figure out how much it would cost to insure the car. Meanwhile, French Air Traffic Control had allowed Hammond and May to take a shortcut in their planned route and travel over central France rather than the Eastern border, meaning that by the time Clarkson had reached Troyes, the plane was virtually neck-and-neck with it. Fortunately, as Hammond and May were about to take the lead, May revealed that because of the delays in setting off from Cuneo and from having to refuel in Saint-Étienne, it would get dark whilst they were still flying over Northern France, and because May was not licensed to fly the plane at night, they would be forced to land in Lille. By the time they had touched down, Clarkson was close to Lens, around 70 miles from Calais, meaning that it was still neck-and-neck. However, as Hammond and May had to take a bus from the airport to Lille-Europe station to catch the Eurostar to London, Clarkson's lead was starting to increase again to the point that he arrived on British soil about half an hour before Hammond and May's Eurostar had passed through the Channel Tunnel. Once the train arrived at Waterloo Station, Hammond and May took a route 26 bus to reach Tower 42, whilst Clarkson was entering the city via the Blackwall Tunnel. When all three presenters reached Tower 42, they all struggled to understand the building's series of lifts, none of which directly went to the restaurant on the 42nd floor; indeed Clarkson was shown having to ask some of the staff for directions. When Hammond and May reached the finishing point, they could not see Clarkson there and so began to think that they had managed to win, until they both simultaneously noticed Clarkson's reflection in a window on the far side of the restaurant. As the three of them were sitting together eating dinner prepared with Clarkson's truffle (although May fell asleep with his drink in his hand due to the tiredness of having to fly the plane), Clarkson remarked that his victory was a hollow one, as he knew he would have to go through the rest of his life knowing that he would never own the car that had won him the race, which he would later describe back in the studio as "the best car ever made", and which would later win the Top Gear 'Car of the Decade' Award a few series later. Winner: Car

DVD release: This race was released as part of the Top Gear: The Challenges 1 DVD. A much shorter version was included on the Top Gear: The Races DVD.

=== Polar race – Toyota Hilux vs. dog sled – distance 400 miles ===
Series Nine, Episode Seven (25 July 2007)

Clarkson and May drove a modified Toyota Hilux against Hammond, Matty McNair and a dog sled team in a race across the Canadian arctic. Clarkson and May won the race, and became part of the first successful attempt to drive a motor vehicle to the North Magnetic Pole. Winner: Car

DVD release: A director's cut of this race was released on Blu-ray. The televised version was released as part of the Top Gear: The Great Adventures 1 DVD box set.

=== London race – car vs. bicycle vs. boat vs. public transport – distance 17 miles ===
Series Ten, Episode Five (11 November 2007)

May (in a Mercedes-Benz GL-Class) raced Hammond (on a Specialized Sirrus Limited hybrid bicycle), The Stig (using the London public transport system), and Clarkson (in a Cougar motorboat) from Kew across to London City Airport. The Stig started on a route 391 bus to Gunnersbury station, then got on a District line train to Monument station, before taking the Docklands Light Railway from Bank station to London City Airport Station. Hammond took the lead from the start, although traffic lights meant May remained close behind. The speed limit of 9 mph on much of the River Thames put Clarkson firmly in last place. Congestion on Piccadilly let Hammond shake off May, who was further slowed after the Metropolitan Police stopped him to check the camera car's permit. With Hammond eight miles from the airport, Clarkson passed under Wandsworth Bridge, at which point the Thames had no speed limit. He therefore shot past May and the Stig, but was shocked to discover Hammond had still won by a fair margin. The Stig arrived a short while later, beating May by 15 minutes. Despite the result shown in the film, the presenters mockingly denied this outcome (by saying things such as Hammond crashing into railings and Clarkson's boat exploding), and insisted that May in the Mercedes-Benz won the race fairly. Winner: Bicycle

DVD release: This race was released as part of the Series 10 box set. It was also released as part of the Top Gear: The Challenges 2 DVD.

=== Nissan GT-R vs. Japanese public transit system – distance 355 miles ===
Series Eleven, Episode Four (13 July 2008)

In what is commonly agreed to be the closest Top Gear race ever staged, Clarkson drove a Nissan GT-R through Japan, from Hakui, Ishikawa to Mount Nokogiri, while Hammond and May took public transport—most notably the 168 mph Shinkansen. Before even setting off, Hammond and May were certain that the car couldn't win because of the speed limits on Japan's motorway network, the near constant presence of speed cameras and the fact that the car had to drive through Tokyo which May described at the time as the most congested city in the world, not to mention the fact that Japan had one of the world's most efficient public transport networks. However, Clarkson remained confident he could win, putting faith in Hammond and May not being able to complete the race without making a mistake in the several connections they had to make during their journey, using multiple different modes of public transport.

Hammond and May first took a brisk 25-minute walk to Hakui Station, where they would take a limited express train to Kyoto. They would then get the bullet train to Shin-Yokohama, the Yokohama Subway to Yokohama Station, the suburban train to Kurihama and from there take a short bus-ride to the ferry which would take them to the other side of the bay where they would take a cable-car to the finishing point at the top of Mount Nokogiri. Clarkson's route, however, would take him eastwards of Hakui to the city of Joetsu, Niigata before taking a path through the Japanese Alps towards Tokyo, where he would then have to drive through the city to the famous Aqua-Line which he would use to cross Tokyo Bay, before driving up the mountain road to Mount Nokogiri. Clarkson was heavily relying on his sat-nav system, but was hesitant to make any adjustments to it because all of the instructions were in Japanese.

Two hours into the race, Hammond and May were already two thirds of the way to Kyoto, but Clarkson had not even reached Joetsu, and had started encountering roadworks which further slowed his progress. By the time Hammond and May had started their journey on the bullet train at just after 11:30am, Clarkson had barely made it past Joetsu and still had to cross the entire spine of Japan, and just half an hour later, Hammond and May were passing through Nagoya. However, Clarkson's journey improved to the point he arrived in Tokyo before the train had reached Yokohama station. Moreover, because Hammond and May had less than 10 minutes to make their connection to the subway and couldn't understand the subway's instructions or directions, they had to guess which was the correct train to get on to, and only found out they'd guessed correctly when they were pulling into the first of their 5 stops. However, disaster then struck for Clarkson during a call to Hammond and May as they were waiting for their connection to Kurihama when he accidentally turned off the GT-R's sat-nav system. Because the car's dials were all in Japanese, he couldn't work out how to recover the sat-nav for 45 minutes.

However, whilst Hammond went to try his hand at one of the train's self-serving drinks machines while the train was waiting at the station, the train Hammond and May were on split in half, with the half May was on continuing onwards to Kurihama whilst Hammond's half stayed put in the station and then proceeded to leave without him after Hammond got off to see where May's train had gone. Thanks to some guidance from a kind local, Hammond eventually got himself on a second train going to Kurihama and even more fortunately, May succeeded in holding the bus at Kurihama for him, and the two were successfully reunited. Whist May and Hammond were preparing to cross Tokyo Bay on a ferry, Clarkson had finally managed to recover his satnav and drove straight for the Aqua-Line under Tokyo bay, but due to the time he'd lost in the city centre, he thought that his chances of winning the race had all but vanished. Meanwhile, although the cable-car station was a full mile from the ferry dock, Hammond and May used folding bicycles (carried in their suitcases) to get them there, allowing them to make up time on Clarkson who had arrived on Mount Nokogiri's mountain roads just before the ferry had docked. Whilst Hammond and May were just getting out of the cable-car on top of the mountain, Clarkson reached the mountain's car park and, seeing that Hammond and May weren't there, assumed that he had won the race, only to be told by the film crew that the finishing line was actually at the very top of the mountain next to a large statue of Buddha. All three presenters proceeded to run the rest of the way, converging on the finishing point from two different directions. Clarkson made it to the summit less than 3 minutes before Hammond and May, and was visibly still out of breath when the other two arrived. Winner: Car

DVD release: This race was released as part of the Series 11 box set. It was also released as part of the Top Gear: The Challenges 3 DVD.

=== Economy race to Blackpool – Jaguar XJ vs. VW Polo vs. Subaru Legacy – distance 750 miles ===
Series Twelve, Episode Four (23 November 2008)

With the team booked to switch on the famous Blackpool Illuminations, the three were presented with a challenge to determine which of them would get the honour of pulling the switch. This took the form of a race from Basel to Blackpool, taking a route of their choice and using any unmodified production car, the only restriction being that they could only use a single tank of fuel. All three presenters chose diesel vehicles – May a Subaru Legacy, Hammond a Volkswagen Polo BlueMotion, to the scorn of his compatriots, and Clarkson a Jaguar XJ. He had dismissed the race as pointless, since the figures indicated no production car at the time could make the distance, and therefore decided to "fail in style and comfort". Finally, the Stig was dropped off in Blackpool to pull the switch if no-one arrived.

Each presenter took different routes across France. Hammond opted for the shortest possible, while May added 30 miles to avoid mountains and several towns. Clarkson headed straight for the nearest motorway and drove "like a loony", heating seats, charging his phone and running the radio in the hope of emptying his fuel tank in France. After initially struggling with economy, both Hammond and May realised their pace was too slow, and decided to pick up speed. May caught up with Hammond, and the two began an overtaking duel all the way to Calais, arriving 40 minutes behind Clarkson.

The presenters had also chosen different routes across England. Hammond again opted for the shortest, via the M1 and M6. May decided to avoid the risk of M6 traffic by heading along the M1 up to Leeds, then switching to the M62. Clarkson chose to use the M40, with his theoretical route changing to the M6 at Birmingham, although he was really trying to run out of fuel near his house. Despite his fuel-wasting, he passed Oxford with a considerable level remaining, and slowed down, finally taking the race seriously. When Hammond found out that Clarkson was still running, he picked up speed and overtook the Jaguar on the M6 Toll. Given his near-empty tank, Clarkson decided to remain economical until his range reached 0, as Hammond's charge had reduced the BlueMotion's range drastically.

With May out of the running due to his slow speed and a trouble-free M6, Hammond's theoretical range reached zero. Once the Jaguar did the same, Clarkson accelerated to catch Hammond. However, his charge was too late, as Hammond was greeted with a police escort just outside Blackpool. Clarkson arrived less than a minute later. May did eventually finish, albeit 40 minutes after the celebration ended. With seconds to go before the switch-on, Richard—despite winning—claimed Jeremy should switch the light, and in the ensuing argument, the Stig pulled the switch. Afterwards, it was found Clarkson's car had 120 miles of fuel left, giving the Jaguar a range of nearly 900 miles. Hammond and May both conceded that despite the Polo arriving first, the Jaguar was to be declared the "real" winner. Winner: VW Polo Bluemotion (Jaguar XJ by agreement)

DVD release: This race was released as part of the Series 12 box set.

=== Ferrari Daytona vs. powerboat – distance 206 miles ===
Series Twelve, Episode Five (30 November 2008)

Hammond drove a Ferrari Daytona against May and his co-driver in an XSR 48 powerboat from Portofino to Saint-Tropez. Both were stopped by the Italian police at different points to check documents, but Hammond was forced to follow the police to a nearby police station, whereas May did not; this probably led to May winning the race. Winner: Boat

DVD release: This race was released as part of the Series 12 box set. It was also released as part of the Top Gear: The Challenges 4 DVD.

=== London to Edinburgh – Race to the North – Jaguar XK120 vs. Vincent Black Shadow vs. Tornado locomotive – distance 378 miles ===
Series Thirteen, Episode One (21 June 2009)

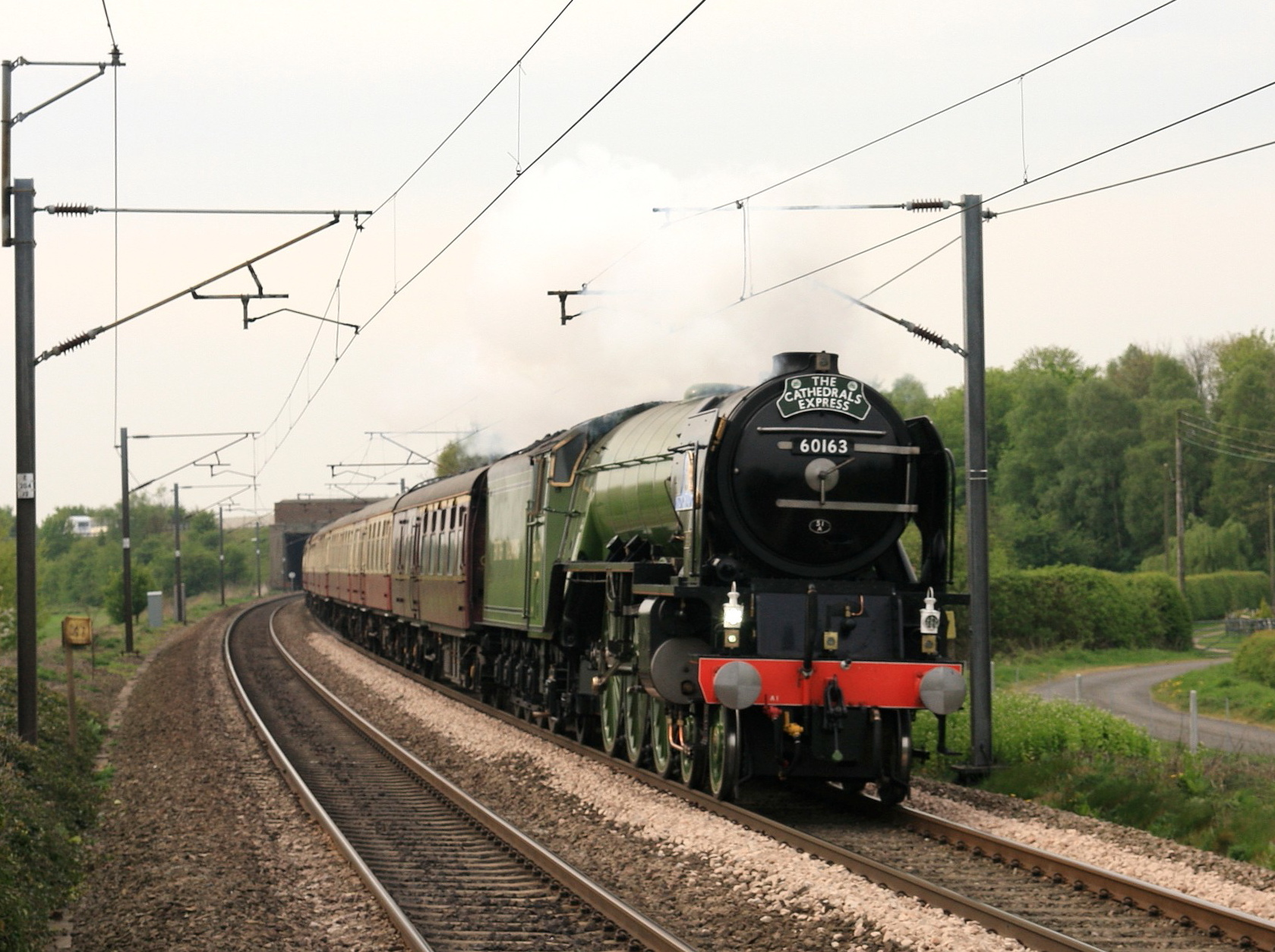
Tornado on the Race to the North, 25 April 2009.

On 25 April 2009, the BBC filmed a private charter train hauled by the brand new steam locomotive 60163 Tornado. Clarkson (on the train) raced May (in a 1949 Jaguar XK120) and Hammond (on a 1949 Vincent Black Shadow motorcycle) from London King's Cross to Edinburgh Waverley. Tornado completed the run in exactly eight hours, with four stops for water, while May and Hammond were restricted to the A1 Road (as no motorways existed yet in 1949). May would later reveal in a newspaper column that he arrived at the finishing line at the Balmoral Hotel barely 10 minutes before Clarkson did. Winner: Car

DVD release: This race was released as part of the Series 13 box set. It was also released as part of the Top Gear: The Challenges 4 DVD.

=== Ford Shelby Mustang GT500 vs. French TGV – distance 814 miles ===
Series Nineteen, Episode Three (10 February 2013)

In what was the first long-distance race between a car and public transport that Top Gear had done for 8 seasons, Clarkson raced Hammond and May from Wembley Stadium to the San Siro in Milan, where the winner would get a free ticket to watch AC Milan play Anderlecht in the UEFA Champions League. However, to stop Clarkson from choosing, in his own words, "a £350,000 supercar made of rhodium and myrrh" as he had previously chosen for similar races, the producers this time set a restriction for him: he could choose any current production car he liked, as long as it cost no more than £35,000. He therefore decided to drive the 662 horsepower Ford Shelby Mustang GT500 while Hammond and May would travel by public transport, primarily using the French TGV. Their route comprised a combination of bus and commuter train to St Pancras International, followed by a Eurostar train to Paris Gare du Nord where they would then take the TGV to Milan, before taking the Milan Metro to Lotto Fiera before reaching the San Siro stadium on foot. Clarkson meanwhile took the standard journey to Dover where he would catch a ferry across the English Channel to France, then proceeding through Mont Blanc tunnel into Italy. However, even before the race began, all three presenters knew that Hammond and May had a huge advantage this time around. Due to the advancements in public transport since the previous Top Gear long-distance race, the Eurostar train from St Pancras to Paris was 20 minutes faster than on previous trips, whilst the ferry journey that the car had to make to cross the Channel was now 40 minutes longer because of a change in the type of boat used. This meant that Hammond and May effectively began the race with an hour's advantage, and both were supremely confident that this would be the first long-distance race they would win.

Beginning at just after 3:30am on Wembley Stadium's pitch-side, Clarkson decided to drive through London rather than go around the North Circular Road and M25, thinking that the lack of traffic would mean the geographically shorter route would on this occasion be the faster. Hammond and May meanwhile took the route 83 bus from outside the stadium to Hendon before taking a First Capital Connect train service to St Pancras International. As they were waiting for the 5:40am Eurostar to depart, the GPS tracker in Clarkson's car showed Hammond that he had managed to reach Dover. However, the Eurostar train made such good progress that, due to the ferry not setting off until well past 6:00am, Hammond and May were already under the Channel by the time Clarkson left British soil. This, coupled with the fact that the ferry journey took 90 minutes (compared to 50 minutes as in previous races), meant that Hammond and May's train arrived in Paris at almost exactly the same time as Clarkson disembarked at Calais, giving then a lead of more than 200 miles. However, because Hammond and May's train from Gare de Lyon to Milan would not leave for another 80 minutes, Clarkson had an opportunity to close the gap. However, whilst stopping for petrol, Clarkson discovered that the GT500 only had a 50-litre fuel tank, meaning that he would on average have to stop for fuel every 140 miles owing to the car's poor fuel economy. To make matters worse, when he received a call from Hammond telling him that he and May had just departed from Paris, Clarkson worked out he had only narrowed their lead to 100 miles, the news of which made him virtually certain he was going to lose the race.

However, as the three presenters continued making their way through France, the race began to turn. As the train neared the French Alps, it was having to navigate the winding tracks on the old section of the TGV network, meaning Hammond and May's speed slowed considerably. This allowed Clarkson to begin to cut into the huge lead the train had built in the first half of its journey, and whilst Hammond and May were stationary just outside Lyon, Clarkson had just passed Dijon, meaning Hammond and May's lead was now only around 130 miles. Moreover, the car's journey to Milan was far more direct than the train's, and the train stopped at almost every single station along the TGV's route through the Alps, meaning Clarkson was very much back in the race. He made such good progress in the ensuing hour that he was virtually neck and neck with the train by the time he was closing in on the Mont Blanc tunnel. However, extensive French roadworks in the form of contraflows in front of the Mont Blanc tunnel slowed the car significantly, allowing Hammond and May to build up their lead again. However, there were no roadworks or traffic on the Italian side of the Mont Blanc Tunnel, meaning that Clarkson still believed he was in with a chance.

Hammond and May's TGV arrived in Milan at 6:00pm, from where they then took two trains on the Milan Metro to Lotto Fiera. With only one ticket up for grabs, and with May refusing to run on television, when their final train arrived, Hammond scampered out of the station to run ahead of him. However, May produced a foldable bicycle out of his bag in hopes of outpacing his colleague, but Hammond was still faster and reached the finishing point first, taking sole possession of the ticket. Clarkson, who had also been hampered by match-day traffic, finished behind both of his colleagues in what is still the only Top Gear long-distance race in which car was beaten by public transport. Clarkson would later attest back in the studio that the roadworks on the French side of the Mont Blanc tunnel, presumably to carry out necessary repairs in advance of the skiing season, had lasted for nearly 100 km, and it had been this that had cost him the race. Winner: Train

DVD release: This race was released as part of the Series 19 box set.

=== Toyota Corolla 1.8L vs. AC45 sailing boat – distance 410 miles ===
Series Twenty, Episode One (30 June 2013)

Clarkson tried to prove that fossil fuels are still superior to alternatives, and raced a blue 1.8L Toyota Corolla against May in an AC45 Sailing Boat, helmed by Olympian Ben Ainslie, and crewed by America's Cup winners. The race was in New Zealand, from Fletcher Bay at the top of the Coromandel Peninsula to Spirits Bay in Northland.

When a baffled May questioned his choice of vehicle, Clarkson explained that it was a hire car, which he claimed made it the fastest in the world because he could redline it until he crashed it.

Clarkson had to drive south on the Coromandel Peninsula before he could turn north towards Northland, making his journey 410 miles, over May's direct route of 220 miles. During the race Clarkson heavily abused his car and rendered it undriveable after crashing into a stone wall to avoid a tractor. He was forced to stop, visit a hire car centre, and exchange his broken Corolla for another – then hope that May did not notice that his car was now red. May was constantly battered by the rough seas, and lost his satellite phone during the race after being hit by a large wave.

Despite trying to make up ground by using Ninety Mile Beach, Clarkson was beaten to the finish line by May, who had a lead of an hour over the car. Also, May noticed that the car was no longer blue at the end of the race. Winner: Sailing boat

=== St. Petersburg race – car vs. bicycle vs. hovercraft vs. public transport – distance 18 miles ===
Series Twenty Two, Episode One (25 January 2015)

The presenters decide to redo the race they did in London between all of them, this time travelling across St Petersburg. Clarkson selects a hovercraft, Hammond chooses a £9,000 (Pinarello Dogma F8) bicycle, May picks a Renault Twizy, and the Stig again relies on public transport. From the start, neither Hammond or Clarkson have it easy with their choice of transport. Clarkson found driving his hovercraft – which he called a Russian design of the presenters' Hovervan – to be quite difficult; along with his instruments and controls being in Russian, he could not keep the craft pointing forward or in a straight line. Meanwhile, Hammond, while managing to overtake and then be overtaken by May, ran afoul of the city's tramlines. Hammond caught a wheel in one of the rails and fell, shearing off the bicycle's derailleur and rendering it useless. The others continued racing and Hammond soon re-entered the race on a second bike, which was borrowed from a passer-by (who was given a lift to his work as compensation).

May, meanwhile, suffered no issues whatsoever, and so was able to enjoy the car he was driving. He remarked how he liked the fact that it was designed for European cities, having two seats in tandem, an electric engine, and scissor doors. However, as he reached the city-centre, he discovered that the city's streets and roads were much wider than he expected them to be. Clarkson, who managed to gain the lead despite the handling issues, soon hit the city-centre, where he attempted to use narrow, peaceful canals to avoid the heavy river traffic he encountered. Unfortunately for him, this led him towards low bridges instead, which required him to deflate the hovercraft's skirts repeatedly to squeeze under the bridges. Although his new bicycle was slower and less comfortable than his first mount, Hammond began to catch up to May and Clarkson.

Clarkson and Hammond soon reached the finish line, with Hammond coming in just moments after Clarkson, only to find that both had been beaten by May, who was waiting in hiding for them. While they commented that the car had redeemed itself in the race, they realised that one of them was missing. The Stig, who had suffered no major issues when using public transport, failed to finish in the end: he had spotted a Porsche 911 and was banging his helmet against the fence that protected it. Winner: Car

=== Arabian Peninsula race – car vs. alternative "money no-object" transportation: sports bike, private jet, luxury car and motorboat ===
Series Twenty Four, Episode Four (26 March 2017)

LeBlanc and Harris are competing against each other in a race from Dubai to a mountaintop hotel in Oman. Harris drives the Bugatti Chiron while LeBlanc takes a combination of luxury transports: a motorboat, a luxury car, a private jet and a sports bike. Early in the race, Harris faced rush hour traffic while Matt was stuck on a 5-knot speed limit zone. As traffic cleared, Harris was escorted out of Dubai by the Dubai Police Force while LeBlanc cleared the marina, enabling him to get the boat to speed before entering the second stage, which was being chauffeured in a Bentley Mulsanne EWB by the Stig's "Emirati cousin", but is stuck in Dubai's downtown district, falling 100 miles behind Harris. However, Harris was stuck immediately upon entering Oman as the Chiron had to be re-registered while LeBlanc arrived at the airport to board the HondaJet to Muscat, enabling him to gain significant ground despite the 100-mile distance between Muscat and the finish line. Meanwhile, Harris attempts to take a shortcut through a network of alleyways at a town, slowing his progress significantly. In Muscat, LeBlanc entered the fourth and final stage of his journey, riding the Ducati 1299 Superleggera. At the final leg of the race, both entered the mountains from opposite direction, leading to a tense final sprint. Winner: Alternative "money no-object" transportation

== Car versus... challenges ==
- Car vs. aerobatics plane: Hammond presented a race between the Stig, in a Radical SR3, against British Aerobatic Champion Tom Cassells, in a CAP 232 Aerobatic Plane, around the Top Gear test track. Winner: Plane Series One, Episode Nine
- Car vs. racing pigeons: May used a Ford SportKa equipped with satellite navigation to compete against racing pigeons in a point-to-point race. Winner: Pigeons Series Four, Episode Four
- Car vs. snooker player: Ronnie O'Sullivan had to pot 14 snooker balls while his Mercedes-Benz SL500 was raced around the Top Gear test track by The Stig. Winner: Snooker Player Series Four, Episode Four
- Car vs. all-terrain skateboarder: Hammond presented a pair of races on the "Green Mile", a half-mile downhill course in Wales, between double world champion all-terrain skateboarder Tom Kirkman and a Mitsubishi Lancer Evolution VII Group N rally car, and then a Bowler Wildcat, both driven by Ben Collins. Winner Race 1: Skateboarder; Race 2: Car Series Five, Episode Two
- Car vs. bobsleigh: May co-piloted a Mitsubishi Lancer Evolution rally car driven by Henning Solberg, racing Hammond and the Norwegian Olympic bobsleigh team down a mountain in Lillehammer, Norway. Winner: Bobsleigh Series Five, Episode Eight (repeated in the Winter Olympics Special)
- Car vs. tank: Clarkson raced a Range Rover Sport across a Dorset field before a Challenger 2 tank could get gun lock on him. Winner: Tank Series Six, Episode One
- Car vs. marathon runner: Clarkson raced a Fiat Nuova Panda against marathon runner A.C. Muir around the London Marathon circuit during the morning rush-hour. Winner: Runner Series Six, Episode Seven
- Car vs. snowmobile – over water: Hammond visited Iceland and raced a modified off-road vehicle against a snowmobile over Lake Kleifarvatn. Winner: Snowmobile Series Six, Episode Ten
- Car vs. rock climbers: Clarkson, in an Audi RS4, competed against two rock climbers, Leo Houlding and Tim Emmett, in a race from the bottom of a French gorge to the top. Winner: Rock Climbers Series Seven, Episode Two
- Car vs. urban downhill cyclist: May raced a Renault Clio III down the narrow streets of Castle of São Jorge's district in Lisbon against downhill bike racer Gee Atherton. Winner: Cyclist Series Seven, Episode Four
- Car vs. greyhound: Hammond drove a Mazda MX-5 against Ireland's most expensive greyhound, Mama Tina, around Shelbourne Park's greyhound track in a one-lap pursuit style race. Winner: Greyhound Series Seven, Episode Six
- Car vs. speed skater: Clarkson, in a Jaguar XK8, raced against speed skater Eskil Ervik, around a speed skating track. Winner: Speed Skater Winter Olympics Special
- Car vs. trail of fuel: Clarkson raced a Chevrolet Corvette Z06 against a trail of fuel. The race began when the quarter-mile-long trail of petrol was lit. Winner: Car Series Eight, Episode Two
- Car vs. motor powered kayak: Hammond visited Iceland and raced a TVR-powered Bowler Tomcat 4x4 against a motorised kayak, piloted by its inventor Shaun Baker, over Jökulsárlón. Winner: Kayak Series Eight, Episode Two
- Car vs. parachutist: Hammond raced two miles (3.2 km) against a British army parachutist in Cyprus with a Porsche Cayenne Turbo S. Winner: Parachutist Series Eight, Episode Four
- Car vs. traceurs: May raced two traceurs, Daniel Ilabaca and Kerbie, over six miles (9.7 km) across Liverpool in a Peugeot 207 1.6L Diesel, from the edge of the city to the Liver Building. Winner: Traceurs Series Eight, Episode Seven
- Car vs. DIY Car: Clarkson, Hammond, and May have to build a Caterham 7 as a kit car from scratch, racing against time on another Caterham 7 driven by the Stig, driving from Surrey to Scotland (465 miles). The team has to finish building the car within 8 hours before the Stig arrives at Scotland. Winner: DIY Car (The Stig was arrested for speeding on the last three miles) Series Eight, Episode Seven
- Car vs. fighter jet: Hammond raced a Bugatti Veyron against a Eurofighter Typhoon, piloted by RAF Squadron Leader Jim Walls, to see which one could most quickly travel a distance of two miles (the Bugatti along a runway and back, the Eurofighter climbing a mile straight up and back down). Winner: Jet Series Ten, Episode Three
- Car vs. rollerblades: Hammond drove an Aston Martin V8 Vantage against Dirk Auer, a man on roller skates with a turbo-powered rocket backpack, in a straight half-mile drag race. Winner: Car Series Ten, Episode Five
- Car vs. tall man: May used an Alfa Romeo 159 in a race against Graham Boanas, to discover who could cross the 1.5-mile (2.4 km) wide Humber River faster without using the Humber Bridge. Winner: Man Series Ten, Episode Six
- Car vs. BMX bikes: May travelled to Hungary and raced a Fiat 500 against some BMX cyclists (the traceurs from the previous Liverpool challenge) through the streets of Budapest. Winner: Bikes Series Ten, Episode Nine
- Car vs. skiers: Hammond travelled to Les Arcs in the French Alps to race an Audi RS6 estate against two skiers, Antoine Montant (the Columbia world speed flyer champion 2007) and François Bon, down a mountain from Arc 1950 to Villaroger. (Note: Hammond had to find his way around the village to find the pub, giving the skiers extra time.) Winner: Skiers Series Eleven, Episode Two
- Car vs. hunters: Clarkson and Hammond travelled to Gloucestershire to combine Green Laning and Fox hunting into a new sport where the prey is a 'green laner' in an off-road vehicle. Clarkson raced a Daihatsu Terios nine miles (14 km) cross-country to the designated finishing point at Tewkesbury Park, while Hammond and a group of hunters chased him. (Note:After that Hammond said that Clarkson was finally eaten by dogs.) Winner: Hunters Series Eleven, Episode Five
- Car vs. Royal Mail: Hammond and May drove a Porsche Panamera in a race against a letter delivered by Royal Mail from the Isles of Scilly to Orkney. Winner: Royal Mail Series Thirteen, Episode Four
- Car vs. British Army: Clarkson, in a Mitsubishi Lancer Evolution VII, raced five miles (8.0 km) around a plainfield in Dorset against a team from the British Army. Army vehicles used during the race included the Jackal, Mastiff, Panther, and Trojan. At one stage, Clarkson hid beside the Trojan, ending up with the Trojan ripping off part of the car's roof. Winner: British Army Series Thirteen, Episode Four
- Car vs. snowmobiles: Hammond took a modified Volkswagen Touareg to a ski resort in Sweden, in order to race some "Swedish youths" on snowmobiles. The race was a dead heat until the near end, with it all coming down to a drag race across a frozen lake. Winner: Car Series Fifteen, Episode Five
- Car vs. gravity: Hammond raced one mile (1.6 km) against a Volkswagen Beetle dropped from a helicopter on a salt flat in South Africa with a Porsche 997 Turbo S. Winner: Gravity Series Sixteen, Episode One
- Car vs. God: Clarkson, in a supercharged V8 MK IV Jaguar XJ, departed Land's End (Britain's most westerly point) at sunset and raced 432 miles (695 km) to Lowestoft (Britain's most easterly point) attempting to arrive before sunrise. The race was held during the Summer Solstice to add an extra challenge. Winner: Car Series Sixteen, Episode Six
- Car vs. skeleton racer: May returns to Lillehammer and co-pilots a Mini WRC rally car, driven by Kris Meeke, against skeleton racer Amy Williams. Winner: Car Series Seventeen, Episode One
- Car vs. jet propelled man: Hammond and Finnish world rally driver Toni Gardemeister race the world's first jet propelled man, Yves Rossy, in a Škoda Fabia S2000 around an eight-mile special Welsh Rally Stage. Winner: Man Series Eighteen, Episode Five
- Car vs. autonomous military machine: May in new Range Rover vs the TerraMax at Nevada Automotive Test Centre, Nevada. Winner: Car Series Nineteen, Episode Five
- Car vs. quad bike/jet ski hybrid: Hammond in the new Alfa Romeo 4C vs Clarkson in the Gibbs Quadski around Lake Como. Winner: Car (Clarkson allowed Hammond to win because he didn't want the Alfa to lose) Series Twenty one, Episode Two

== Small races ==
- Old cars vs. new cars – drag race (a.k.a. Top Gear Generation Game): Five of Clarkson's older cars face off versus five of Hammond's modern vehicles. The pairings were: Golf GTi MKI vs MKIV, Toyota MR2 old vs new, Ford Escort RS Cosworth vs Focus RS, Peugeot 205 vs 206, Nissan 300ZX vs 350Z. Series Three, Episode Eight
- Diesel vs. petrol: A race between Clarkson in a diesel Škoda Fabia and Hammond in a petrol Mini Cooper to see if diesel had caught up to petrol. Series Four, Episode Eight
- Old cars vs. new cars – road circuit, race vs. showroom: three pairs made up of one classic racer and one showroom car raced against the clock in The Stig's hands. The pairings were: 1974 British Rally Championship-winning Ford Escort vs Ford Focus RS, Four times Le Mans-winning (1966–69) Ford GT40 vs Noble M400; 1983 World Rally Championship-winning Audi Quattro vs Mitsubishi Lancer Evolution VIII MR FQ-340. Series Five, Episode Eight
- RWD vs. 4WD – rally special stage: May took The Stig to an indoor exhibition rally track of the World Rally Championship at the Millennium Stadium to compare the RWD and 4WD Porsche 997 Carrera. Series Seven, Episode Five
- Old cars vs. new cars – hill climb: May and Hammond oversaw a race against the clock at the Prescott Hill Climb course, which featured an Austin-Healey Sprite and a modified Peugeot 306, both driven by The Stig. Series Seven, Episode Six
- Real life vs. a computer game – road circuit: Clarkson travelled to the Mazda Raceway Laguna Seca to compare a real life lap in a Honda NSX with one he did earlier using the same car in the PlayStation 2 game Gran Turismo 4. Series Seven, Episode Six
- Biathlon: Clarkson (in a Volvo XC90) raced May (in an Audi Q7), in a "car-biathlon", with cross-country driving instead of skiing. Winter Olympics Special
- RWD vs. 4WD – off-road slalom: Clarkson (in a RWD Jaguar XK) and May (in a 4WD Land Rover Discovery) created a slalom course on a frozen lake and raced against the clock. Winter Olympics Special
- Supercar MPG – fuel economy part 1: Clarkson staged a race between five supercars (Ferrari 599 GTB, Mercedes-Benz SLR McLaren, Lamborghini Murciélago LP640, Aston Martin DBS, and Audi R8) to see which could travel the furthest on one gallon of petrol. Series Eleven, Episode One Winner: Audi R8
- Hybrid vs. petrol – fuel economy part 2: Clarkson then held a race between a petrol BMW M3 and Toyota Prius to see if hybrid cars really are more economical than petrol. This wasn't really a race, but a test to see which car used more petrol. The Prius was instructed to be driven as fast as possible around the Top Gear test track for 10 laps, whilst Clarkson, driving the M3, just had to keep up. The Prius averaged 17.2mpg, whereas the M3 averaged 19.4mpg. Series Eleven, Episode One Winner: BMW M3
