= Orsières railway station =

Railway station in Orsières, Switzerland

Orsières
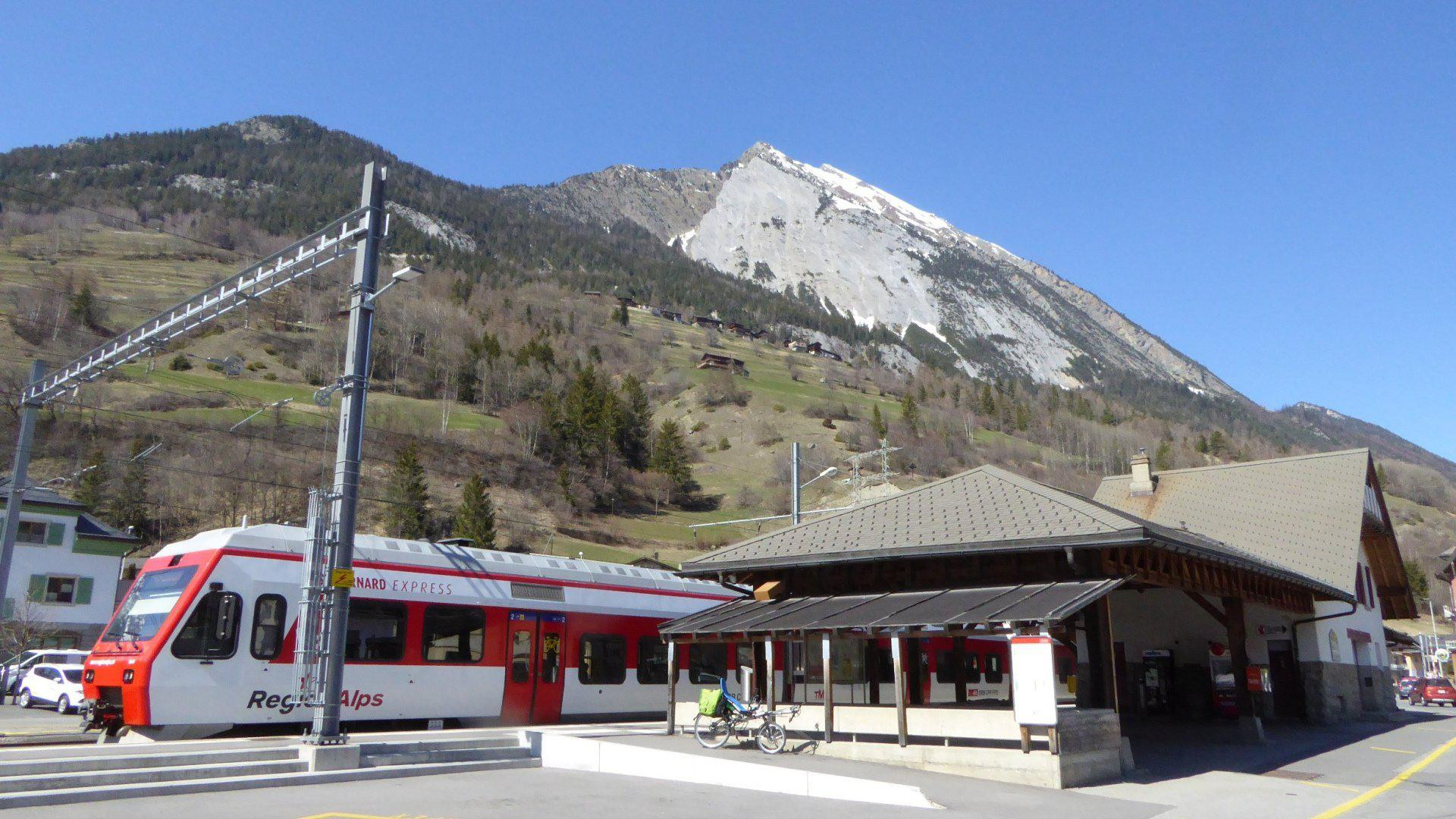
- The station in 2019

General information
- Location: Orsières; Switzerland
- Coordinates: 46°01′40″N 7°08′37″E
- Elevation: 902 m (2,959 ft)
- Owner: Transports de Martigny et Régions
- Line: Martigny–Orsières line
- Distance: 19.3 km (12.0 mi) from Martigny
- Platforms: 1 side platform
- Tracks: 3
- Train operators: RegionAlps
- Connections: Transports de Martigny et Régions bus lines

Construction
- Accessible: Yes

Other information
- Station code: 8501578 (ORS)

Services
Preceding station	RegionAlps	Following station
La Douay towards Sembrancher	R82	Terminus
Sembrancher Terminus	R82	Terminus
Location

Orsières railway station (French: Gare d'Orsières) is a railway station in the municipality of Orsières, in the Swiss canton of Valais. It is the southern terminus of the standard gauge Martigny–Orsières line of Transports de Martigny et Régions. It is the southernmost station on the Swiss side of the Great St Bernard Pass; bus services connect it with Aosta in Italy.

== Services ==
As of the December 2023 timetable change, the following services stop at Orsières:

- Regio: hourly or half-hourly service to Sembrancher.
