= Les Fumeaux railway station =

Railway station in Martigny, Switzerland

Les Fumeaux

General information
- Location: Martigny; Switzerland
- Coordinates: 46°06′36″N 7°03′53″E
- Elevation: 463 m (1,519 ft)
- Owner: Transports de Martigny et Régions
- Line: Martigny–Châtelard line
- Distance: 1.1 km (0.68 mi) from Martigny
- Platforms: 1 side platform
- Tracks: 1
- Train operators: Transports de Martigny et Régions

Construction
- Accessible: Yes

Other information
- Station code: 8530303 (FUM)

Services
Preceding station	Transports de Martigny et Régions	Following station
Vernayaz MC towards Vallorcine	Regio Mont-Blanc Express	Martigny Terminus
Location

Les Fumeaux railway station (French: Gare des Fumeaux) is a railway station in the municipality of Martigny, in the Swiss canton of Valais. It is an intermediate stop and a request stop on the 1,000 mm (3 ft 3 3/8 in) metre gauge Martigny–Châtelard line of Transports de Martigny et Régions.

== Services ==
As of the December 2023 timetable change, the following services stop at Les Fumeaux:

- Regio Mont-Blanc Express: hourly service between Martigny and Vallorcine.
