= Bovernier =

- Municipality
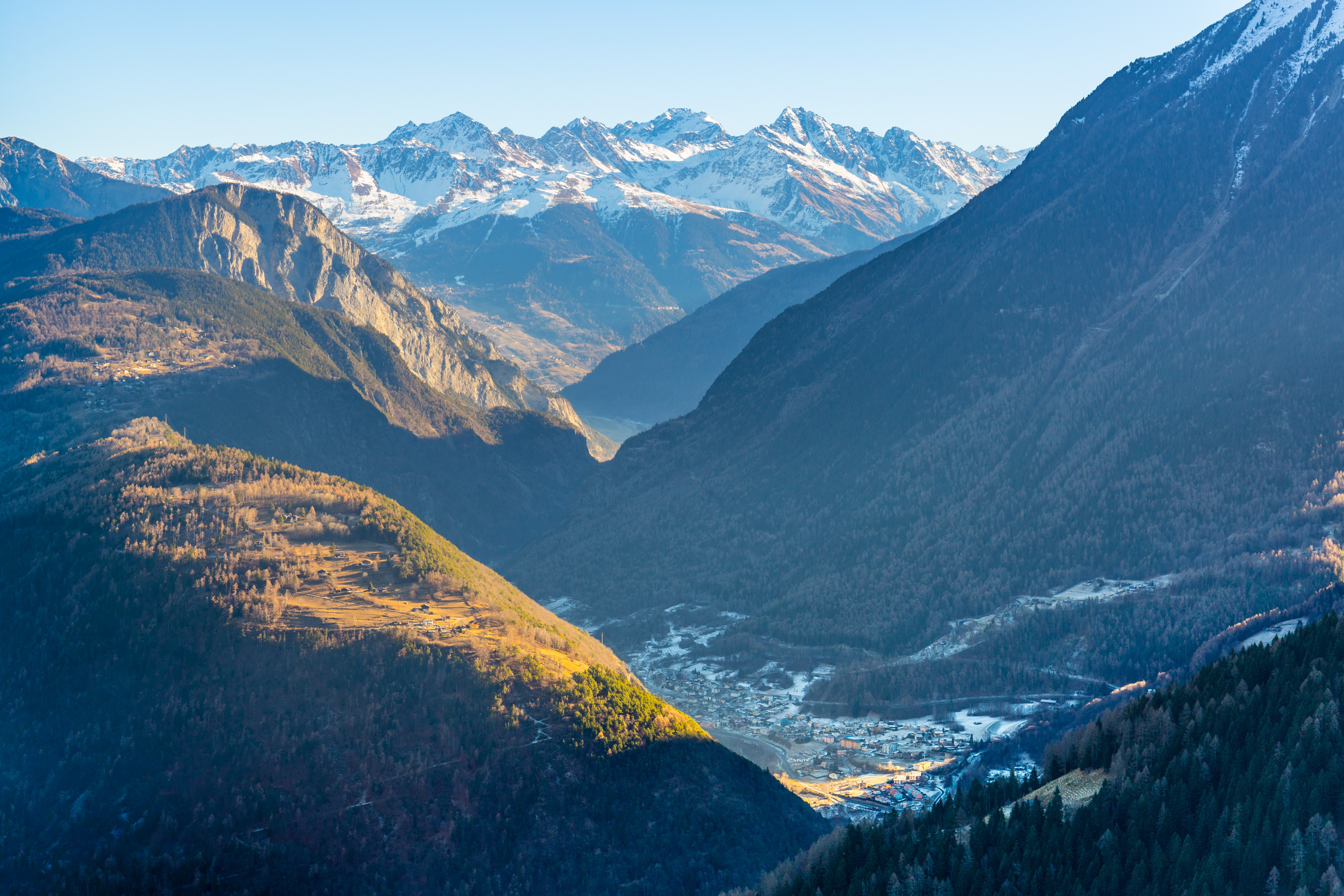

- Flag Coat of arms
- Location of Bovernier
- Location within Switzerland Location within Canton of Valais
- Coordinates: 46°5′N 7°5′E
- Country: Switzerland
- Canton: Valais
- District: Martigny

Government
  - Mayor: Marcel Gay

Area
  - Total: 12.9 km^{2} (5.0 sq mi)
- Elevation: 613 m (2,011 ft)

Population (December 2002)
  - Total: 746
  - Density: 57.8/km^{2} (150/sq mi)
- Time zone: UTC+01:00 (CET)
  - Summer (DST): UTC+02:00 (CEST)
- Postal code: 1932
- SFOS number: 6131
- ISO 3166 code: CH-VS
- Surrounded by: Martigny, Martigny-Combe, Orsières, Sembrancher, Vollèges
- Website: www.bovernier.ch

Bovernier is a municipality in the district of Martigny in the canton of Valais in Switzerland.

== History ==
Bovernier is first mentioned in 1228 as Burgus Warnierus.

== Geography ==
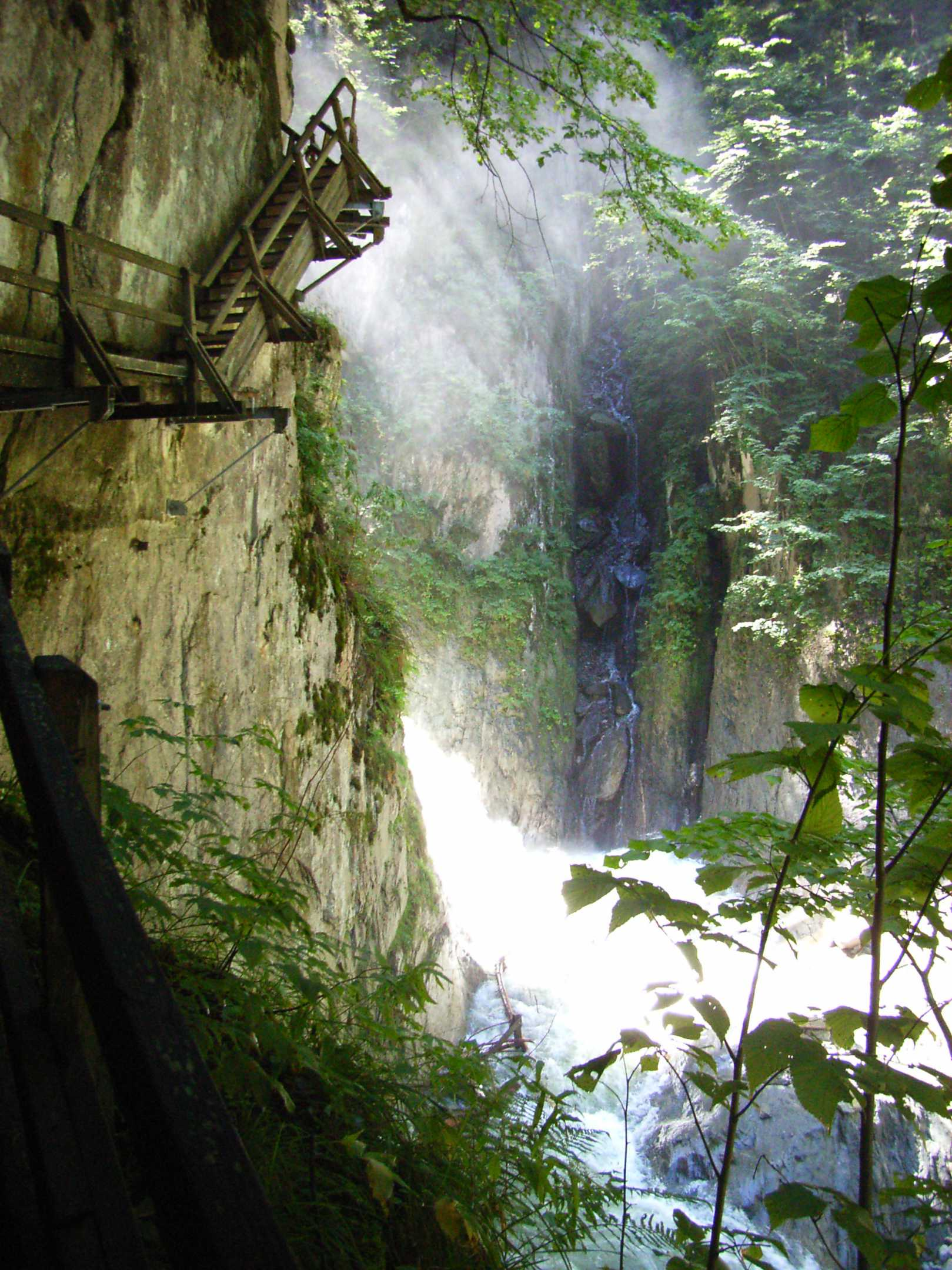
Gorges du durnand at Bovernier

Bovernier has an area, as of 2011, of 12.9 square kilometers (5.0 mi^{2}). Of this area, 5.0% is used for agricultural purposes, while 72.1% is forested. Of the rest of the land, 4.3% is settled (buildings or roads) and 18.5% is unproductive land.

The municipality is located in the Martigny district, at the entrance to the Entremont region. It consists of the village of Bovernier and the hamlet of Les Valettes.

== Coat of arms ==
The blazon of the municipal coat of arms is Azure, issuant from a Castle Argent an Alder-tree Branch palewise Or.

== Demographics ==
Bovernier has a population (as of December 2020) of 911. As of 2008, 6.1% of the population are resident foreign nationals. Over the last 10 years (2000–2010 ) the population has changed at a rate of 5%. It has changed at a rate of 2.1% due to migration and at a rate of 2.3% due to births and deaths.

Most of the population (as of 2000) speaks French (718 or 98.0%) as their first language, Albanian is the second most common (7 or 1.0%) and German is the third (2 or 0.3%). There is 1 person who speaks Italian.

As of 2008, the gender distribution of the population was 49.7% male and 50.3% female. The population was made up of 366 Swiss men (46.2% of the population) and 28 (3.5%) non-Swiss men. There were 375 Swiss women (47.3%) and 24 (3.0%) non-Swiss women.

Of the population in the municipality 455 or about 62.1% were born in Bovernier and lived there in 2000. There were 186 or 25.4% who were born in the same canton, while 42 or 5.7% were born somewhere else in Switzerland, and 39 or 5.3% were born outside of Switzerland.

The age distribution of the population (as of 2000) is children and teenagers (0–19 years old) make up 29.3% of the population, while adults (20–64 years old) make up 55.3% and seniors (over 64 years old) make up 15.4%. As of 2000, there were 296 people who were single and never married in the municipality. There were 375 married individuals, 45 widows or widowers and 17 individuals who are divorced.

As of 2000, there were 278 private households in the municipality, and an average of 2.6 persons per household. There were 69 households that consist of only one person and 36 households with five or more people. Out of a total of 283 households that answered this question, 24.4% were households made up of just one person and there was 1 adult who lived with their parents. Of the rest of the households, there are 82 married couples without children, 105 married couples with children. There were 17 single parents with a child or children. There were 4 households that were made up of unrelated people and 5 households that were made up of some sort of institution or another collective housing.

In 2000, a total of 277 apartments (66.1% of the total) were permanently occupied, while 115 apartments (27.4%) were seasonally occupied and 27 apartments (6.4%) were empty. As of 2009, the construction rate of new housing units was 1.3 new units per 1000 residents. The vacancy rate for the municipality, in 2010, was 0.66%.

The historical population is given in the following chart:

== Politics ==
In the 2007 federal election the most popular party was the CVP which received 39.75% of the vote. The next three most popular parties were the SP (18.77%), the FDP (18.53%) and the SVP (10.56%). In the federal election, a total of 440 votes were cast, and the voter turnout was 71.8%.

In the 2009 Conseil d'État/Staatsrat election a total of 431 votes were cast, of which 26 or about 6.0% were invalid. The voter participation was 70.4%, which is much more than the cantonal average of 54.67%. In the 2007 Swiss Council of States election a total of 436 votes were cast, of which 26 or about 6.0% were invalid. The voter participation was 72.4%, which is much more than the cantonal average of 59.88%.

== Economy ==
As of 2010, Bovernier had an unemployment rate of 4.4%. As of 2008, there were 16 people employed in the primary economic sector and about 5 businesses involved in this sector. 23 people were employed in the secondary sector and there were 8 businesses in this sector. 44 people were employed in the tertiary sector, with 15 businesses in this sector. There were 314 residents of the municipality who were employed in some capacity, of which females made up 40.4% of the workforce.

In 2008 the total number of full-time equivalent jobs was 66. The number of jobs in the primary sector was 9, of which 3 were in agriculture and 6 were in forestry or lumber production. The number of jobs in the secondary sector was 21 of which 5 or (23.8%) were in manufacturing and 15 (71.4%) were in construction. The number of jobs in the tertiary sector was 36. In the tertiary sector; 2 or 5.6% were in wholesale or retail sales or the repair of motor vehicles, 9 or 25.0% were in the movement and storage of goods, 16 or 44.4% were in a hotel or restaurant, 1 was in the information industry, 1 was a technical professional or scientist, 3 or 8.3% were in education.

In 2000, there were 31 workers who commuted into the municipality and 251 workers who commuted away. The municipality is a net exporter of workers, with about 8.1 workers leaving the municipality for every one entering. Of the working population, 10.5% used public transportation to get to work, and 77.4% used a private car.

== Religion ==
From the 2000 census, 677 or 92.4% were Roman Catholic, while 17 or 2.3% belonged to the Swiss Reformed Church. Of the rest of the population, there was 1 member of an Orthodox church, and there were 8 individuals (or about 1.09% of the population) who belonged to another Christian church. There were 6 (or about 0.82% of the population) who were Islamic. 15 (or about 2.05% of the population) belonged to no church, are agnostic or atheist, and 13 individuals (or about 1.77% of the population) did not answer the question.

== Education ==
In Bovernier about 260 or (35.5%) of the population have completed non-mandatory upper secondary education, and 50 or (6.8%) have completed additional higher education (either university or a Fachhochschule). Of the 50 who completed tertiary schooling, 72.0% were Swiss men, 26.0% were Swiss women.

As of 2000, there were 67 students from Bovernier who attended schools outside the municipality.

== Transport ==
The municipality has a railway station, Bovernier, on the Martigny–Orsières line.
