= Orsières =

- Municipality
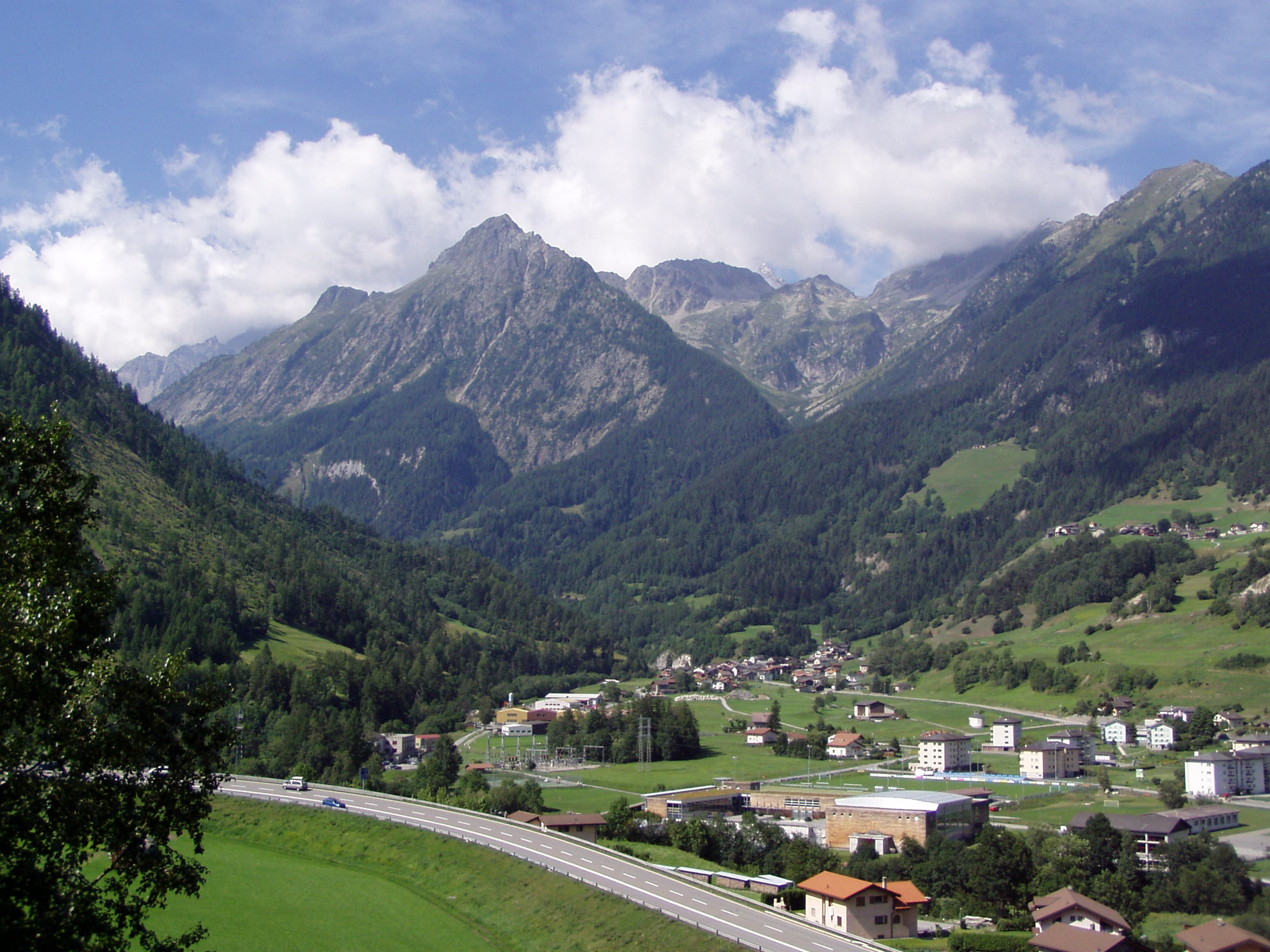
- Orsières

- Flag Coat of arms
- Location of Orsières
- Location within Switzerland Location within Canton of Valais
- Coordinates: 46°2′N 7°9′E
- Country: Switzerland
- Canton: Valais
- District: Entremont

Government
  - Mayor: Jean-François Thétaz

Area
  - Total: 165.0 km^{2} (63.7 sq mi)
- Elevation: 887 m (2,910 ft)

Population (December 2002)
  - Total: 2,736
  - Density: 16.58/km^{2} (42.95/sq mi)
- Time zone: UTC+01:00 (CET)
  - Summer (DST): UTC+02:00 (CEST)
- Postal code: 1937
- SFOS number: 6034
- ISO 3166 code: CH-VS
- Localities: La Duay, Orsières, Somlaproz, Issert, Les Arlaches, Praz-de-Fort, Branche, Prayon, La Fouly, Ferret, Commeire, Reppaz, Chez-les-Addy, Chez-les-Giroud, La Rosière, Chamoille, Soulalex, Verlonne, Chez-les-Reuse, Champex-Lac, Prassurny, Le Biolley
- Surrounded by: Bagnes, Bourg-Saint-Pierre, Bovernier, Chamonix-Mont-Blanc (FR-74), Courmayeur (IT-AO), Liddes, Martigny-Combe, Saint-Rhémy-en-Bosses (IT-AO), Sembrancher, Trient
- Website: www.orsieres.ch

Orsières is a municipality in the district of Entremont in the canton of Valais in Switzerland.

== History ==
Orsières is first mentioned in 972 as Pons Ursarii. In medieval times, it was a stage on the Via Francigena.

== Geography ==
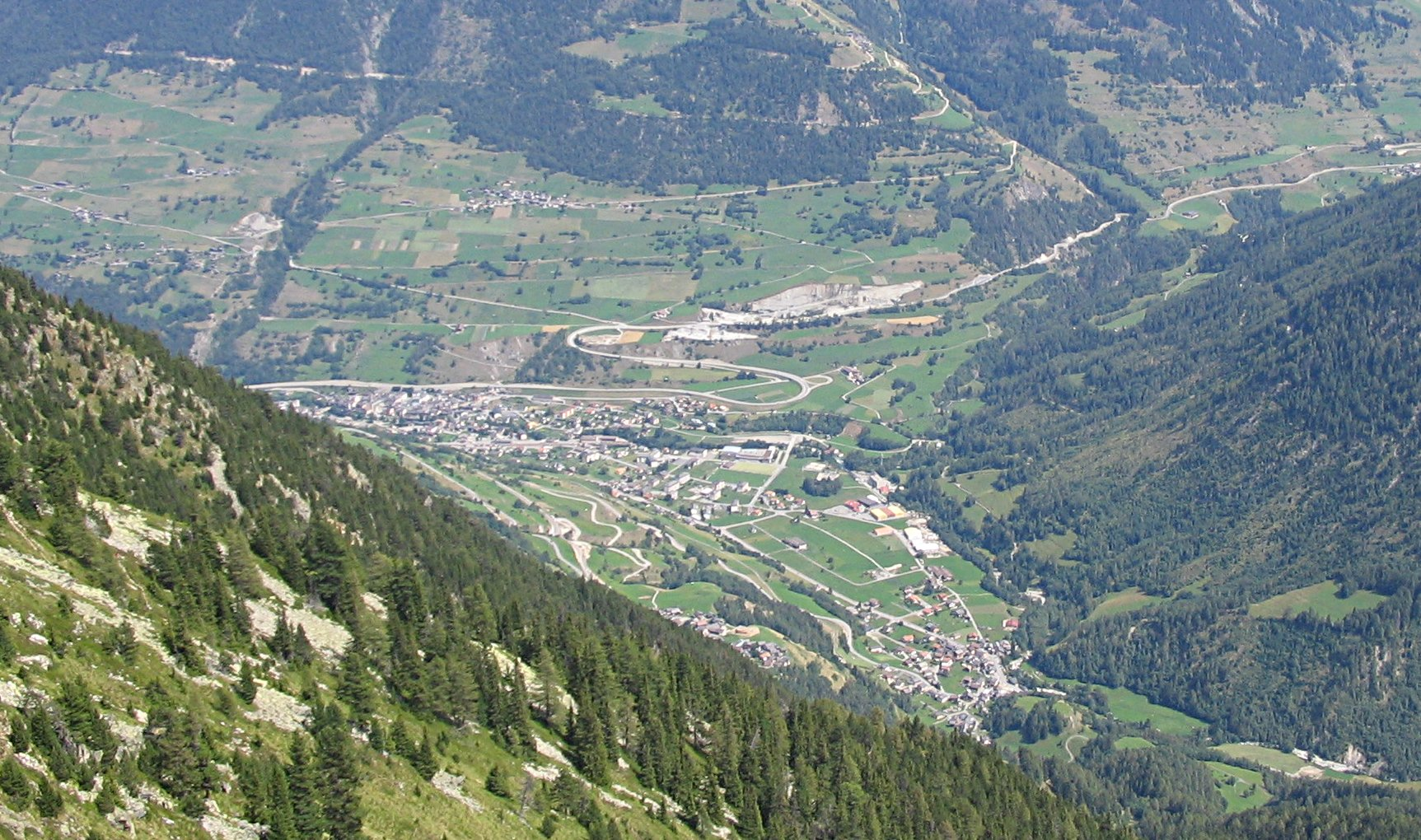

Orsières has an area, as of 2011, of 165 square kilometers (64 mi^{2}). Of this area, 16.8% is used for agricultural purposes, while 25.2% is forested. Of the rest of the land, 1.5% is settled (buildings or roads) and 56.5% is unproductive land.

The municipality is located at the foot of the Mont Blanc Massif on the road over the Great St Bernard Pass. It is located on the border with both Italy and France and covers two valleys, the Val Ferret and the Vallée de Champex. It consists of the village of Orsières and twelve hamlets including Champex, Ferret, Issert, La Fouly and Praz-de-Fort.

=== La Fouly ===
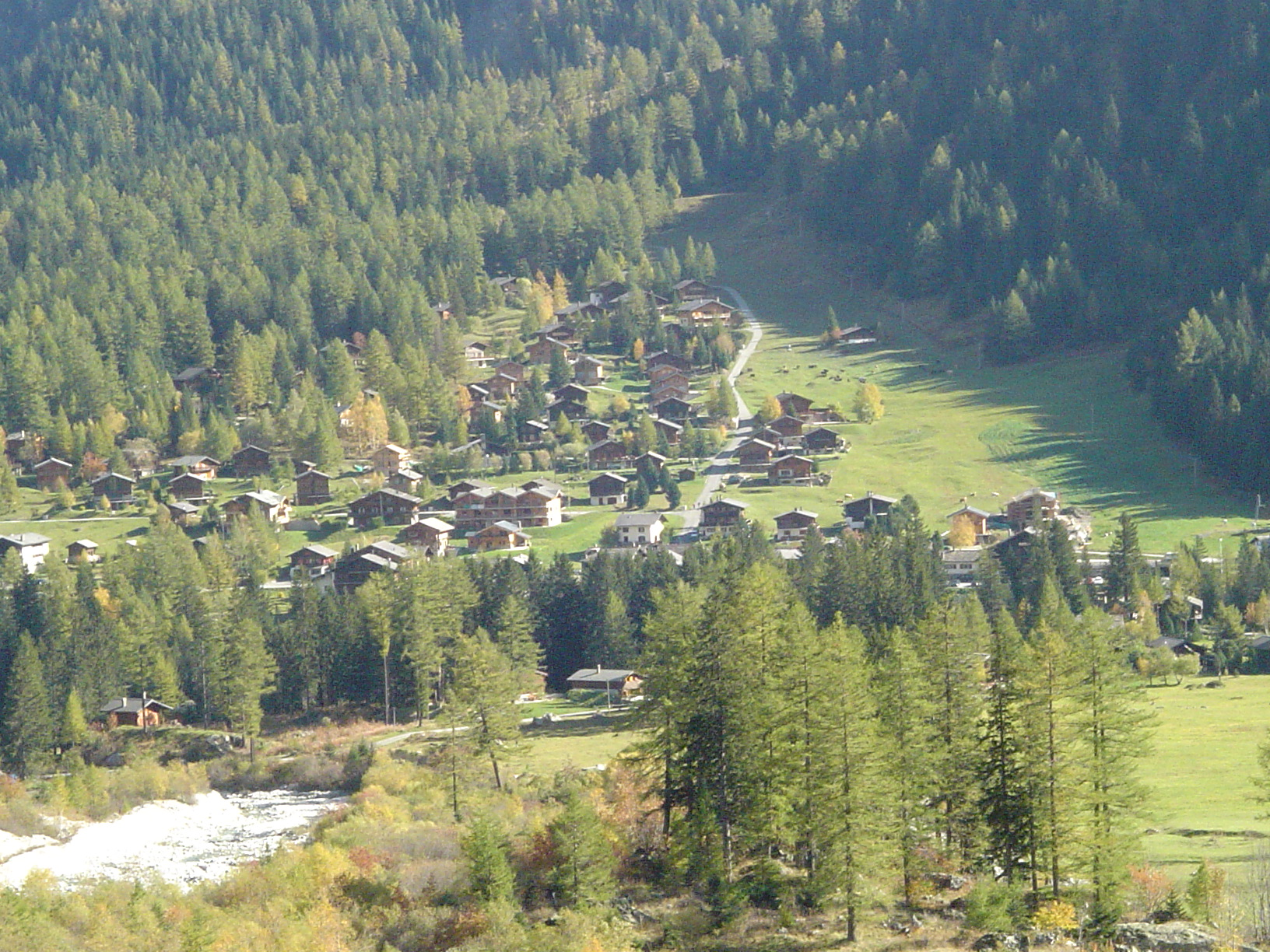
La Fouly

La Fouly (1,992 m (6,535 ft)) is a tourist destination for families and a starting point for many hikes into the surrounding mountains. This hamlet in the municipality of Orsières is located in the Val Ferret (Valais, Switzerland). It is a small ski resort sits at the feet of the Dolent (3,823 m (12,543 ft)) and the Tour Noir (3,836 m (12,585 ft)) in the Mont Blanc Massif. La Fouly is a stopping place for the Tour du Mont Blanc and a waypoint on the Ultra-Trail du Mont-Blanc (UTMB) route.

== Coat of arms ==
The blazon of the municipal coat of arms is Argent, a Bear rampant Sable langued, armed and viriled Gules.

== Demographics ==
Orsières has a population (as of December 2020) of 3,194. As of 2008, 11.5% of the population are resident foreign nationals. Over the last 10 years (1999–2009) the population has changed at a rate of 6.9%. It has changed at a rate of 6.5% due to migration and at a rate of 2.9% due to births and deaths.

Most of the population (as of 2000) speaks French (2,531 or 96.2%) as their first language, German is the second most common (37 or 1.4%) and Portuguese is the third (14 or 0.5%). There are 8 people who speak Italian.

As of 2008, the gender distribution of the population was 51.4% male and 48.6% female. The population was made up of 1,335 Swiss men (45.1% of the population) and 187 (6.3%) non-Swiss men. There were 1,280 Swiss women (43.2%) and 160 (5.4%) non-Swiss women. Of the population in the municipality 1,784 or about 67.8% were born in Orsières and lived there in 2000. There were 361 or 13.7% who were born in the same canton, while 210 or 8.0% were born somewhere else in Switzerland, and 205 or 7.8% were born outside of Switzerland.

The age distribution of the population (as of 2000) is children and teenagers (0–19 years old) make up 27.1% of the population, while adults (20–64 years old) make up 56.9% and seniors (over 64 years old) make up 16%.

As of 2000, there were 1,101 people who were single and never married in the municipality. There were 1,272 married individuals, 179 widows or widowers and 78 individuals who are divorced.

As of 2000, there were 990 private households in the municipality, and an average of 2.6 persons per household. There were 306 households that consist of only one person and 128 households with five or more people. Out of a total of 1,016 households that answered this question, 30.1% were households made up of just one person and there were 16 adults who lived with their parents. Of the rest of the households, there are 231 married couples without children, 377 married couples with children. There were 39 single parents with a child or children. There were 21 households that were made up of unrelated people and 26 households that were made up of some sort of institution or another collective housing.

In 2000 there were 1,130 single family homes (or 75.8% of the total) out of a total of 1,491 inhabited buildings. There were 220 multi-family buildings (14.8%), along with 74 multi-purpose buildings that were mostly used for housing (5.0%) and 67 other use buildings (commercial or industrial) that also had some housing (4.5%).

In 2000, a total of 951 apartments (44.7% of the total) were permanently occupied, while 1,025 apartments (48.2%) were seasonally occupied and 152 apartments (7.1%) were empty. As of 2009, the construction rate of new housing units was 0.7 new units per 1000 residents. The vacancy rate for the municipality, in 2010, was 0.3%.

Historical population

Year	Pop.	±% p.a.
1313	304	—
1339	402	+1.08%
1356	259	−2.55%
1402	122	−1.62%
1798	1,784	+0.68%
1850	2,305	+0.49%
1860	2,384	+0.34%

Year	Pop.	±% p.a.
1870	2,404	+0.08%
1880	2,333	−0.30%
1888	2,222	−0.61%
1900	2,215	−0.03%
1910	2,218	+0.01%
1920	2,251	+0.15%
1930	2,208	−0.19%

Year	Pop.	±% p.a.
1941	2,231	+0.09%
1950	2,286	+0.27%
1960	2,281	−0.02%
1970	2,470	+0.80%
1980	2,357	−0.47%
1990	2,542	+0.76%
2000	2,630	+0.34%

== Notable people ==
- Jean Troillet (born 1948 in Orsières), a professional mountain climber
- Marcel Theux (born 1988 in Orsières), a Swiss ski mountaineer and long-distance runner
- Daniel Yule (born 1993 in Martigny), Swiss World Cup alpine ski racer

== Heritage sites of national significance ==
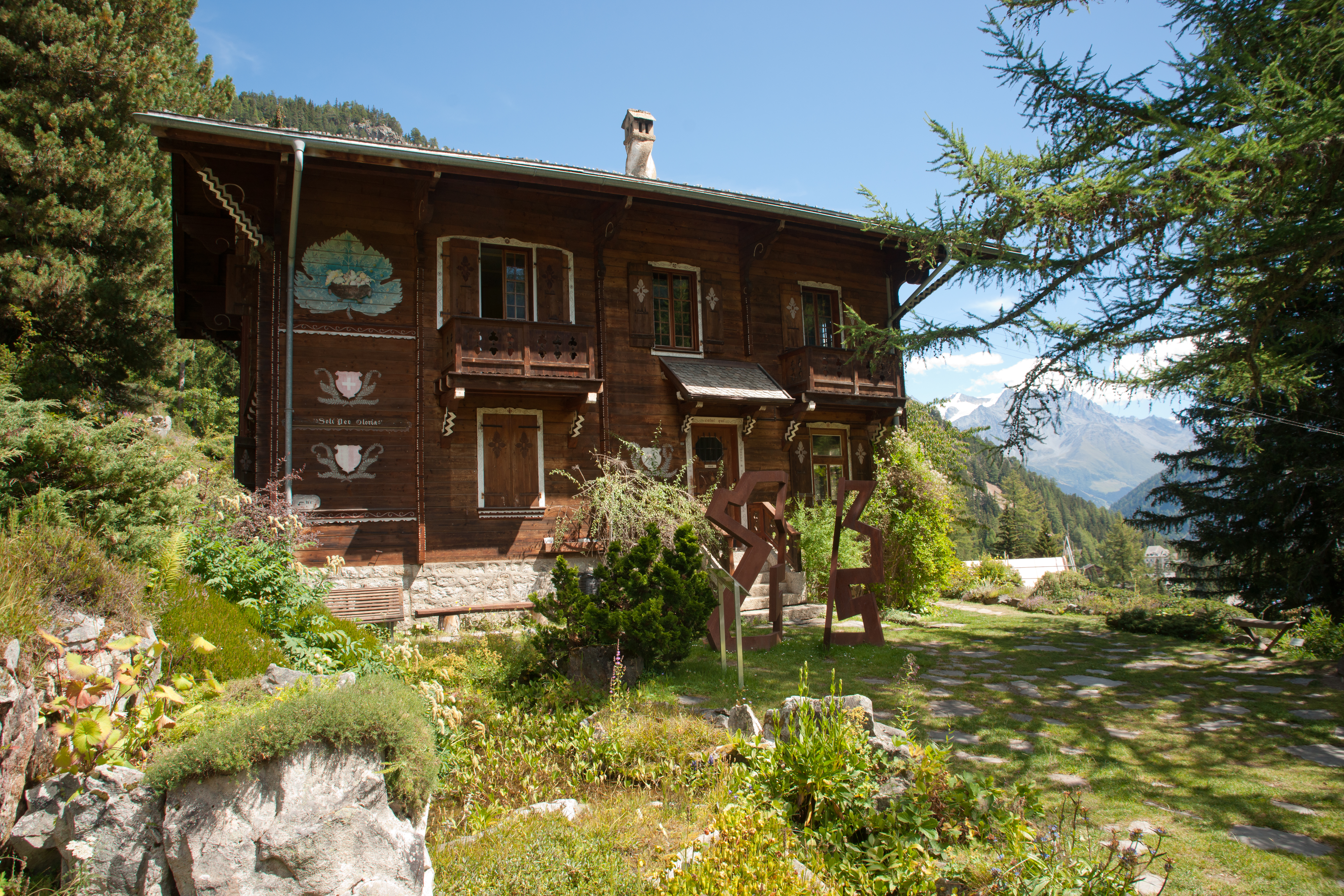
Building in the botanical gardens of Alpin Flore-Alpe

The botanical gardens of Alpin Flore-Alpe are listed as a Swiss heritage site of national significance. The entire hamlet of Commeire is part of the Inventory of Swiss Heritage Sites.

== Politics ==
In the 2007 federal election the most popular party was the CVP which received 53.65% of the vote. The next three most popular parties were the FDP (25.64%), the SVP (11.12%) and the SP (5.02%). In the federal election, a total of 1,468 votes were cast, and the voter turnout was 70.1%.

In the 2009 Conseil d'État/Staatsrat election a total of 1,597 votes were cast, of which 46 or about 2.9% were invalid. The voter participation was 76.3%, which is much more than the cantonal average of 54.67%. In the 2007 Swiss Council of States election a total of 1,458 votes were cast, of which 96 or about 6.6% were invalid. The voter participation was 70.9%, which is much more than the cantonal average of 59.88%.

== Economy ==
As of 2010, Orsières had an unemployment rate of 3.6%. As of 2008, there were 139 people employed in the primary economic sector and about 53 businesses involved in this sector. 318 people were employed in the secondary sector and there were 35 businesses in this sector. 555 people were employed in the tertiary sector, with 112 businesses in this sector. There were 1,137 residents of the municipality who were employed in some capacity, of which females made up 33.9% of the workforce.

In 2008 the total number of full-time equivalent jobs was 826. The number of jobs in the primary sector was 81, of which 71 were in agriculture and 9 were in forestry or lumber production. The number of jobs in the secondary sector was 302 of which 89 or (29.5%) were in manufacturing, 5 or (1.7%) were in mining and 179 (59.3%) were in construction. The number of jobs in the tertiary sector was 443. In the tertiary sector; 99 or 22.3% were in wholesale or retail sales or the repair of motor vehicles, 67 or 15.1% were in the movement and storage of goods, 106 or 23.9% were in a hotel or restaurant, 7 or 1.6% were in the information industry, 14 or 3.2% were the insurance or financial industry, 24 or 5.4% were technical professionals or scientists, 45 or 10.2% were in education and 14 or 3.2% were in health care.

In 2000, there were 194 workers who commuted into the municipality and 446 workers who commuted away. The municipality is a net exporter of workers, with about 2.3 workers leaving the municipality for every one entering. Of the working population, 9.8% used public transportation to get to work, and 60.7% used a private car.

== Religion ==
From the 2000 census, 2,357 or 89.6% were Roman Catholic, while 77 or 2.9% belonged to the Swiss Reformed Church. Of the rest of the population, there were 11 members of an Orthodox church (or about 0.42% of the population), and there were 12 individuals (or about 0.46% of the population) who belonged to another Christian church. There was 1 individual who was Jewish, and 38 (or about 1.44% of the population) who were Islamic. There was 1 person who was Hindu. 74 (or about 2.81% of the population) belonged to no church, are agnostic or atheist, and 64 individuals (or about 2.43% of the population) did not answer the question.

== Weather ==
Orsières has an average of 100.9 days of rain or snow per year and on average receives 772 mm (30.4 in) of precipitation. The wettest month is December during which time Orsières receives an average of 73 mm (2.9 in) of rain or snow. During this month there is precipitation for an average of 8.8 days. The month with the most days of precipitation is May, with an average of 9.7, but with only 65 mm (2.6 in) of rain or snow. The driest month of the year is September with an average of 53 mm (2.1 in) of precipitation over 7.3 days.

== Transport ==
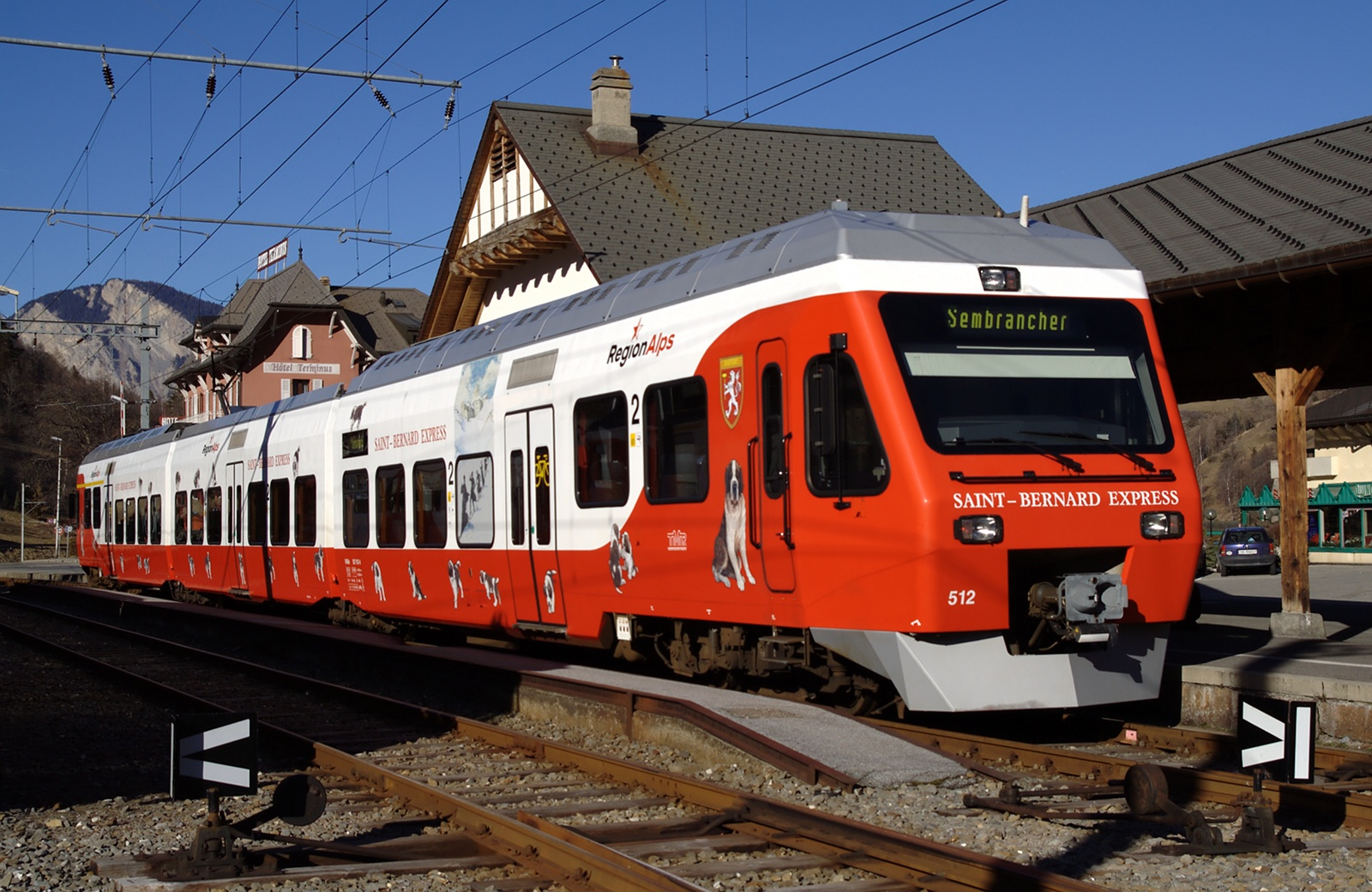
Train of the Transports de Martigny et Régions (TMR) at Orsières

The municipality has two railway stations, Orsières and La Douay, on the Martigny–Orsières line.

== Education ==
In Orsières about 917 or (34.9%) of the population have completed non-mandatory upper secondary education, and 198 or (7.5%) have completed additional higher education (either university or a Fachhochschule). Of the 198 who completed tertiary schooling, 63.6% were Swiss men, 23.2% were Swiss women, 7.6% were non-Swiss men and 5.6% were non-Swiss women.

As of 2000, there were 89 students in Orsières who came from another municipality, while 73 residents attended schools outside the municipality.

Orsières is home to the Bibliothèque municipale et scolaire library. The library has (as of 2008) 11,520 books or other media, and loaned out 24,400 items in the same year. It was open a total of 190 days with average of 8 hours per week during that year.
