= Sembrancher railway station =

Railway station in Sembrancher, Switzerland

Sembrancher
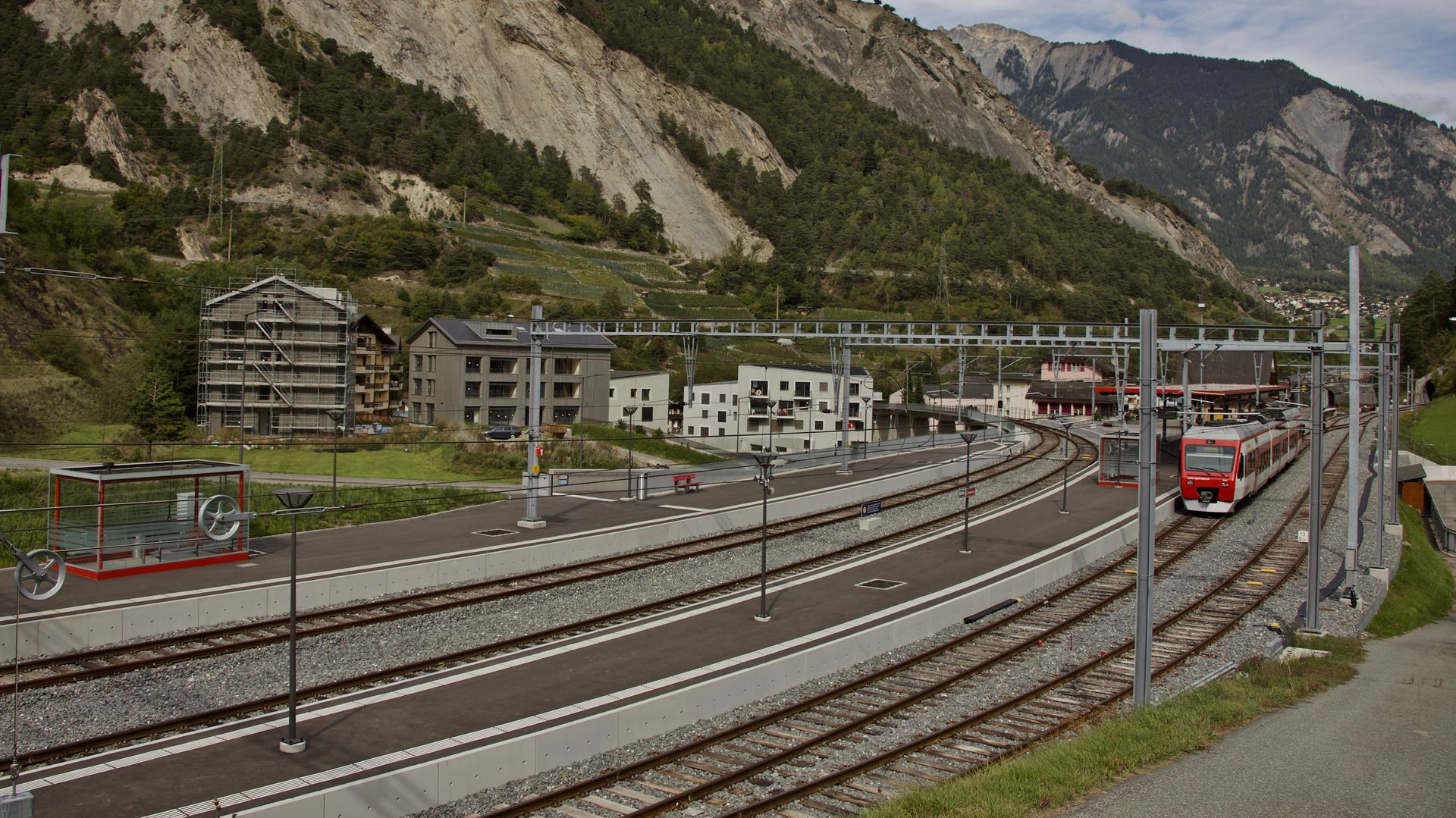
- The station in 2017

General information
- Location: Sembrancher; Switzerland
- Coordinates: 46°04′37″N 7°08′45″E
- Elevation: 717 m (2,352 ft)
- Owner: Transports de Martigny et Régions
- Line: Martigny–Orsières line
- Distance: 13.1 km (8.1 mi) from Martigny
- Train operators: RegionAlps
- Connections: TMR bus lines

Construction
- Accessible: Yes

Other information
- Station code: 8501576 (SEMB)

Services
| Preceding station | RegionAlps | Following station |
|---|---|---|
| Bovernier towards Martigny | R81 | Etiez towards Le Châble VS |
| Martigny Terminus | R81 | Le Châble VS Terminus |
| Terminus | R82 | La Douay towards Orsières |
| Terminus | R82 | Orsières Terminus |
| Preceding station | SBB CFF FFS | Following station |
| Martigny One-way operation | Verbier Express | Le Châble VS Terminus |
| Bovernier One-way operation | VosAlpes Express | Etiez towards Le Châble VS |
Location

Sembrancher railway station (French: Gare de Sembrancher) is a railway station in the municipality of Sembrancher, in the Swiss canton of Valais. It is located on the standard gauge Martigny–Orsières line of Transports de Martigny et Régions, at the point where the line splits, with branches going to Le Châble VS and Orsières.

== Services ==
As of the December 2023 timetable change, the following services stop at Sembrancher:

- Regio:
  - hourly or half-hourly service between Martigny and Le Châble VS.
  - hourly or half-hourly service to Orsières.
- VosAlpes Express: daily direct service to Le Châble VS on weekends between December and April.
