= Le Châble VS railway station =

Railway station in Val de Bagnes, Switzerland

Le Châble VS
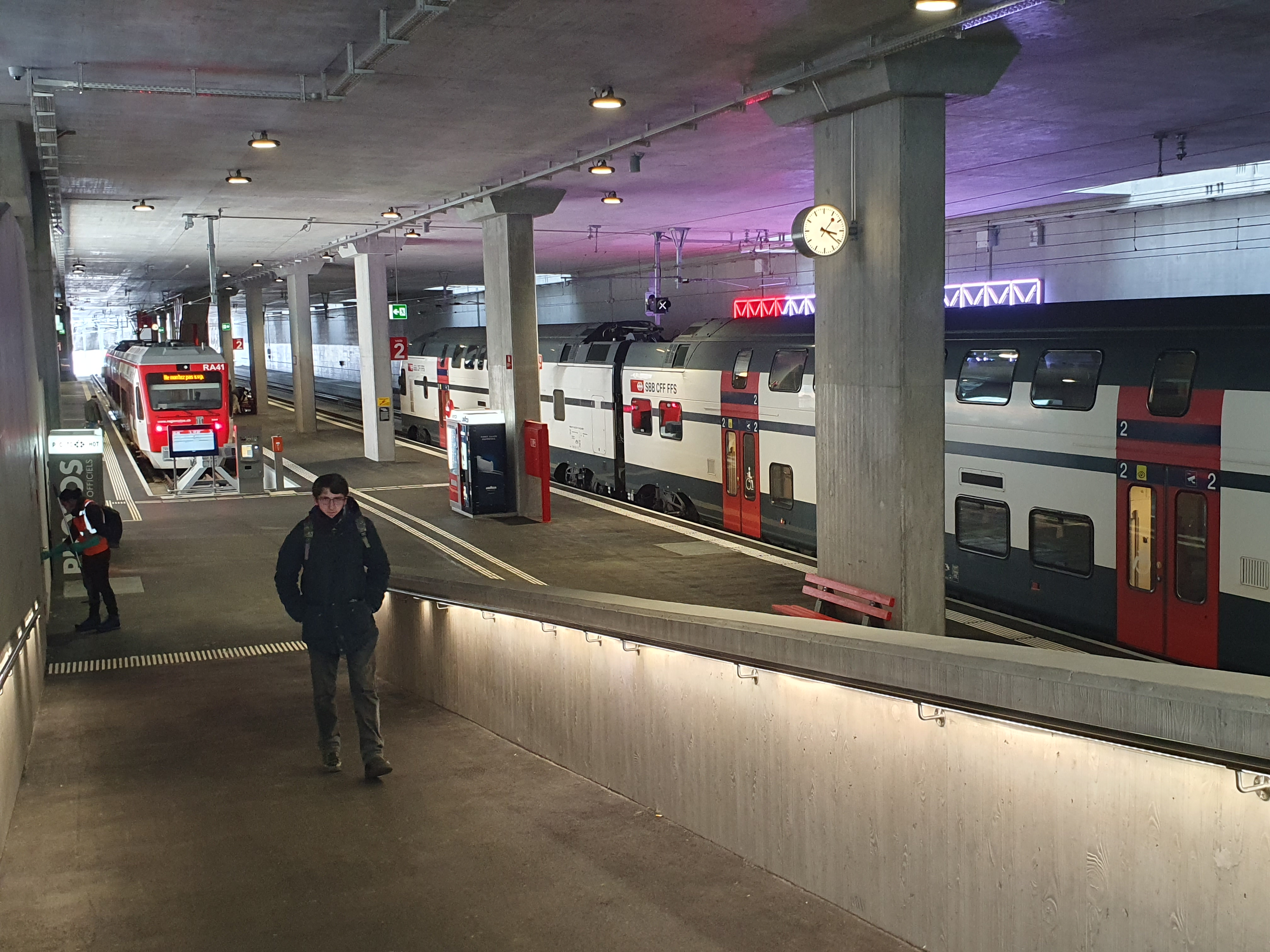
- The underground station in January 2022. A regional train from Martigny on track 1 on the left; a Verbier Express train to Geneva on track 2 on the right

General information
- Location: Val de Bagnes; Switzerland
- Coordinates: 46°04′44″N 7°12′54″E
- Elevation: 820 m (2,690 ft)
- Owner: Transports de Martigny et Régions
- Line: Martigny–Orsières line
- Distance: 19.3 km (12.0 mi) from Martigny
- Platforms: 2 bay platforms
- Tracks: 3
- Train operators: RegionAlps
- Connections: Gondola lift to Verbier; TMR bus lines

Construction
- Parking: Yes
- Accessible: Yes

Other information
- Station code: 8501579 (CHAB)

Services
Preceding station	SBB CFF FFS	Following station
Martigny towards Geneva Airport	Verbier Express	Terminus
Sembrancher One-way operation	Verbier Express	Terminus
Etiez One-way operation	VosAlpes Express	Terminus
Preceding station	RegionAlps	Following station
Etiez towards Martigny	R81	Terminus
Location

Le Châble VS railway station (French: Gare du Châble) is a railway station in the municipality of Val de Bagnes, in the Swiss canton of Valais. It is the eastern terminus of the standard gauge Martigny–Orsières line of Transports de Martigny et Régions.

In January 2019, the new station was opened after an extensive reconstruction, which lowered the tracks and platforms by 4.5 meters, bringing them underground. The new station has two tracks. The shorter track 1 is used by local trains to/from Martigny, while the longer track 2 is able to accommodate the Verbier Express trains which run directly to Geneva and beyond on weekends.

The valley station for a gondola lift to Verbier is adjacent to the station. Local buses to Bruson, Sarreyer and Verbier serve this station as well.

== Services ==
As of the December 2023 timetable change, the following services stop at Le Châble:

- Verbier Express: daily direct service to Geneva Airport on weekends between December and April.
- Regio: hourly service to Martigny.
