= RegionAlps =

Transport company in Switzerland

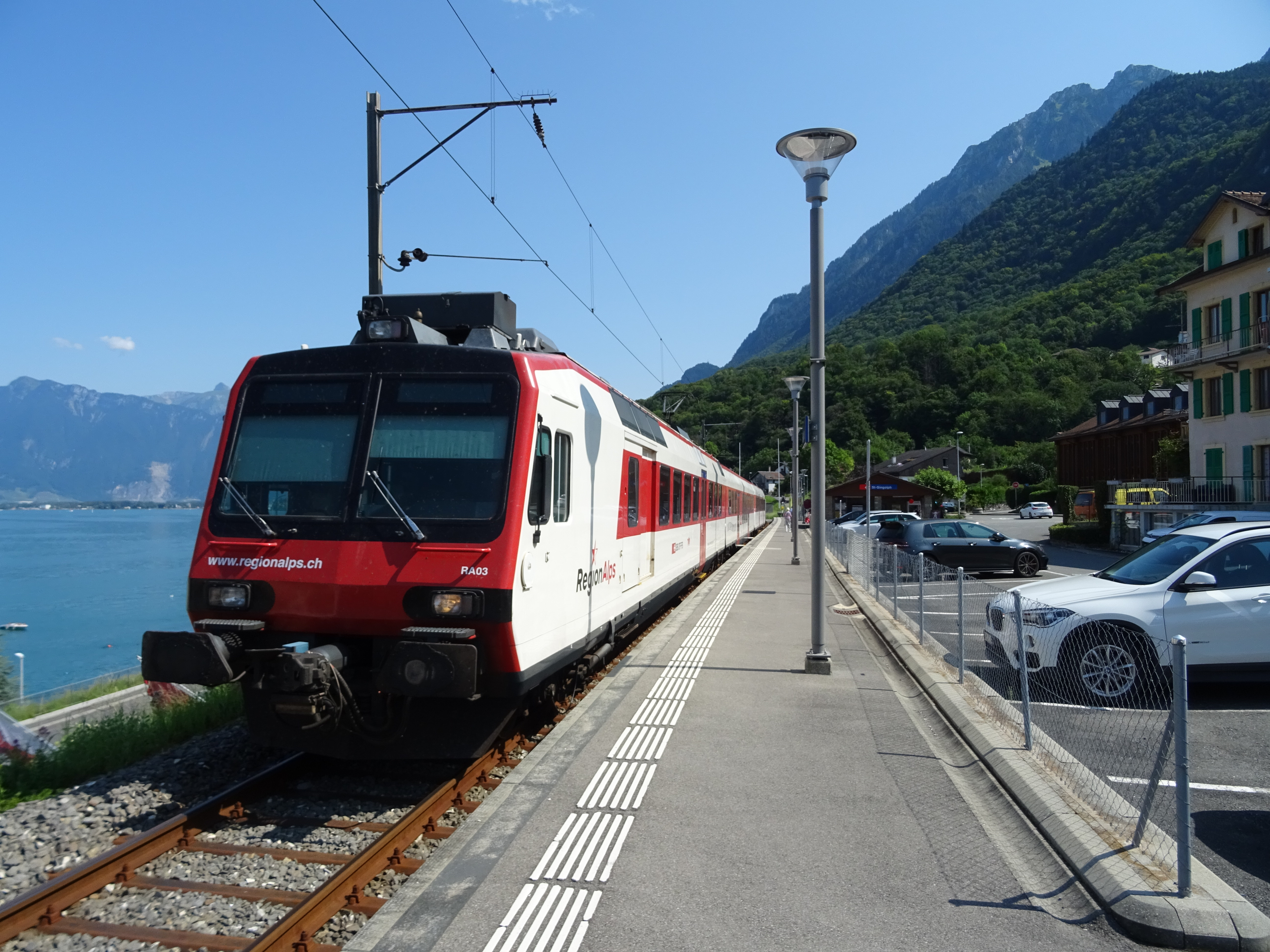
- RegionAlps NPZ trainset at St-Gingolph
- Company type: Jointly SBB CFF FFS (70%), TMR (18%) and cantonal (12%) owned AG/SA
- Industry: Rail Transport; Bus Transport
- Founded: 2003; 23 years ago
- Headquarters: Martigny, Valais, Switzerland
- Divisions: Passenger
- Website: www.regionalps.ch

RegionAlps is a transport company in Switzerland providing S-Bahn services and bus services in the canton of Valais. It is a joint venture between Swiss Federal Railways (SBB CFF FFS), Transports de Martigny et Régions (TMR), and the canton of Valais. It runs passenger trains on the Saint-Gingolph–Saint-Maurice and Simplon lines, between Saint-Gingolph on Lake Geneva (Lac Léman) and Brig, and on the Martigny–Orsières line. It also operates five bus lines between Leuk and Visp.

It carried 9.1 million passengers in 2018, an increase of 6% over the previous year.

== Operations ==
As of the December 2024 timetable change, RegionAlps offers the following services:

=== Rail routes ===
Regio (R):

- R81: Martigny – Sembrancher – Le Châble VS
- R82: Sembrancher – Orsières
- R91: St-Gingolph – Monthey – St-Maurice – Martigny – Sion – Sierre/Siders – Leuk – Visp – Brig

=== Bus routes ===
483	Turtmann − Ergisch
491	Leuk − Turtmann − Gampel − Raron − Visp
492	Leuk − Turtmann − Gampel-Steg
493	Gampel − Raron − Visp
494	Gampel-Steg − Raron − St. German

== See also ==
- Rail transport in Switzerland
- Tonkin Railway
