= Martigny railway station =

Railway station in Martigny, Switzerland

Martigny
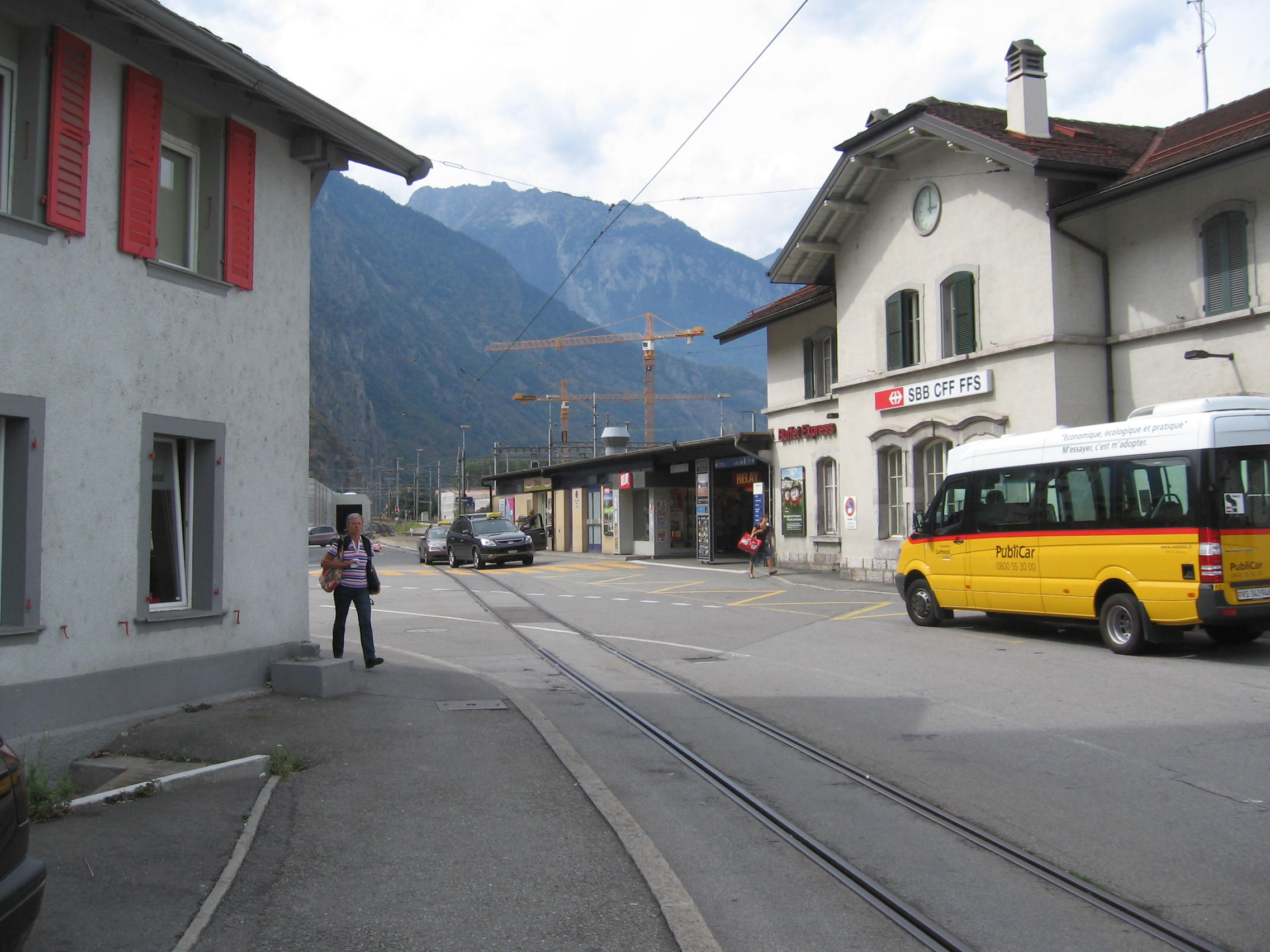
- The station platform in 2011

General information
- Location: Martigny; Switzerland
- Coordinates: 46°06′21″N 7°04′45″E
- Elevation: 466 m (1,529 ft)
- Owner: Swiss Federal Railways
- Lines: Martigny–Châtelard line; Martigny–Orsières line; Simplon line
- Distance: 66.5 km (41.3 mi) from Lausanne
- Platforms: 4; 2 bay platforms; 1 island platform; 1 side platform
- Tracks: 5
- Train operators: RegionAlps; Swiss Federal Railways; Transports de Martigny et Régions
- Connections: Transports de Martigny et Régions bus lines; CarPostal SA bus lines

Construction
- Parking: Yes (36 spaces)
- Cycle facilities: Yes (116 spaces)
- Accessible: Partly

Other information
- Station code: 8501500 (MA)

Passengers
- 2025: 12,200 per day (RegionAlps, SBB (excludes TMR))
- Rank: 65 out of 1,095

Services
Preceding station	SBB CFF FFS	Following station
St-Maurice towards Geneva Airport	IR 90	Sion towards Brig
Aigle towards Geneva Airport	IR 95	Sion towards Brig
St-Maurice towards Annemasse or Geneva Airport	RE33	Terminus
Bex One-way operation	VosAlpes Express	Martigny-Bourg towards Le Châble VS
St-Maurice towards Fribourg/Freiburg	VosAlpes Express	Le Châble VS One-way operation
St-Maurice towards Geneva Airport	Verbier Express	Le Châble VS Terminus
Preceding station	Transports de Martigny et Régions	Following station
Les Fumeaux towards Vallorcine	Regio Mont-Blanc Express	Terminus
Preceding station	RegionAlps	Following station
Vernayaz towards St-Gingolph	R91	Charrat-Fully towards Brig
Vernayaz towards Monthey	R91	Charrat-Fully towards Brig
Terminus	R81	Martigny-Bourg towards Le Châble VS
Terminus	R81	Sembrancher towards Le Châble VS
Location

Martigny railway station (French: Gare de Martigny, German: Bahnhof Martigny) is a railway station in the municipality of Martigny, in the Swiss canton of Valais. It is an intermediate stop on the standard gauge Simplon line of Swiss Federal Railways and the junction of the 1,000 mm (3 ft 3 3/8 in) Martigny–Châtelard and standard gauge Martigny–Orsières lines of Transports de Martigny et Régions and RegionAlps, respectively.

The station has five tracks. Three tracks are located on the Simplon line, served by a side platform and island platform. There is a bay platform on each end of the station, serving the Martigny–Châtelard and Martigny–Orsières lines.

== Services ==
As of the December 2024 timetable change, the following services stop at Martigny:

- InterRegio: half-hourly service between Geneva Airport and Brig.
- RegioExpress: hourly service to Annemasse (on weekdays) or Geneva Airport (on weekends).
- VosAlpes Express: daily direct service between Fribourg/Freiburg and Le Châble VS on weekends between December and April.
- Verbier Express: daily direct service to Le Châble VS on weekends between December and April.
- Regio:
  - half-hourly service between Monthey and Brig, with every other train continuing from Monthey to St-Gingolph.
  - hourly or half-hourly service to Le Châble VS.
  - Mont-Blanc Express: hourly service to Vallorcine, in France.
