= Martigny–Orsières railway line =

Martigny–Orsières
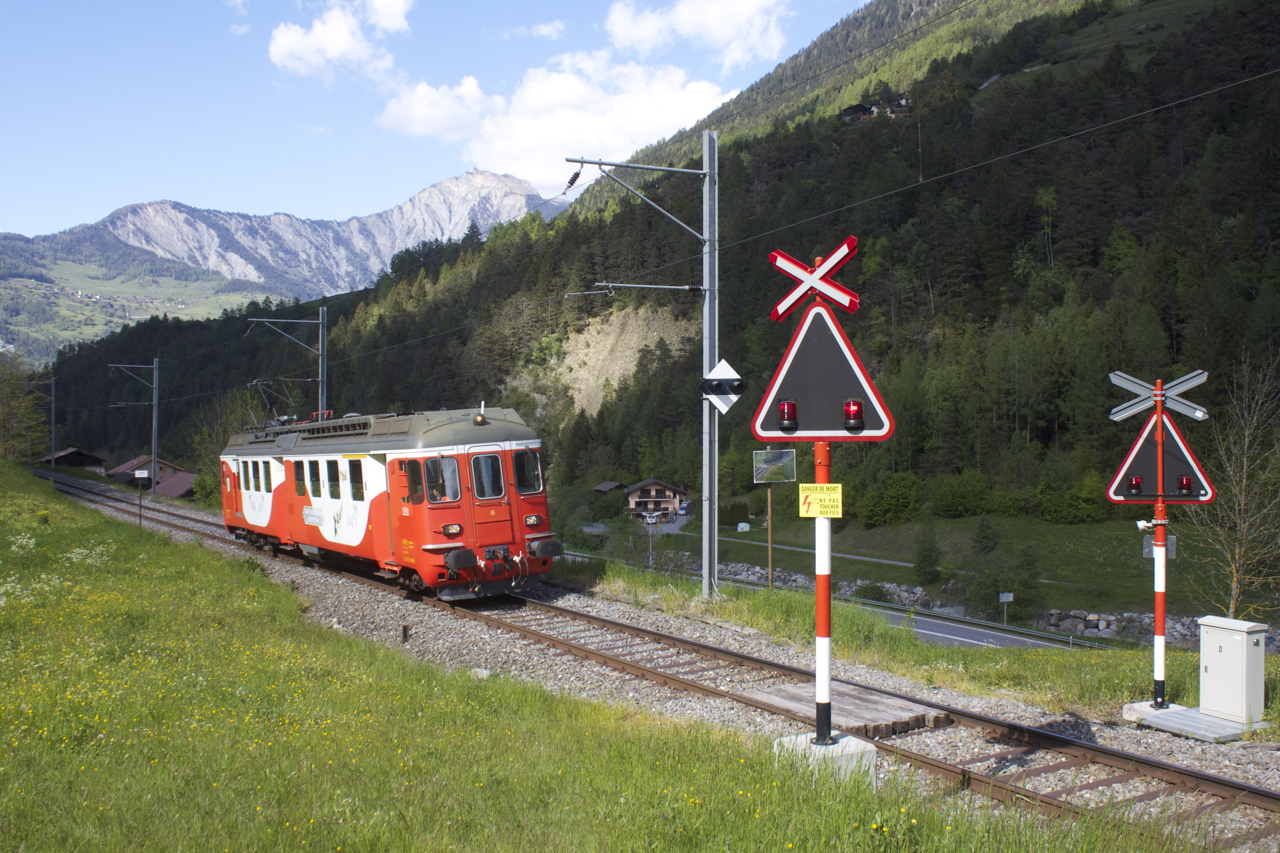
- Multiple unit near Orsières in 2014

Overview
- Owner: Transports de Martigny et Régions
- Termini: Martigny; Orsières

Service
- Operator(s): RegionAlps

Technical
- Line length: 19.3 km (12.0 mi)
- Track gauge: 1,435 mm (4 ft 8 1/2 in) standard gauge
- Electrification: 8000 V 15 Hz AC overhead catenary (1910–1949); 15 kV 16.7 Hz AC overhead catenary (1949–present)

The Martigny–Orsières railway line is a standard gauge railway line in the canton of Valais in Switzerland. It runs 19.3 kilometres (12.0 mi) from a junction with the Simplon line at Martigny to Orsières. A 6.1-kilometre (3.8 mi) branch runs from Sembrancher to Le Châble VS. Transports de Martigny et Régions (TMR) owns the line. Services are operated by RegionAlps, a joint venture of TMR and Swiss Federal Railways. The line was originally built by the Martigny–Orsières Railway (MO) between 1907–1910. The Le Châble branch opened in 1953.

== History ==
The Martigny–Orsières Railway (French: Chemin de fer Martigny–Orsières) was established by British Aluminium as part of a venture to smelt and transport aluminium in the vicinity of Orsières. The line was completed and opened for operation on 1 September 1910 between Martigny and Orsières. Legal issues between British Aluminium and Aluminium Industrie Aktien prevented the construction of the smelter, depriving of the line of much of its intended traffic.

When the line opened it was electrified at 8000 V DC. This was converted to 15 kV 16.7 Hz AC in 1949, in part to allow Swiss Federal Railways locomotives to handle cement trains on the line. (Note: Beecroft gives 16 February as the date of the conversion; Wägli and Jacobi give 4 March. Both agree on 1949.) The company completed a 6.2-kilometre (3.9 mi) branch from Sembrancher to Le Châble VS on 5 August 1953. British Aluminium sold the company to a consortium of cantonal and municipal interests in 1955. The company merged with the Martigny–Châtelard Railway on 1 January 2000 to create Transports de Martigny et Régions (TMR). RegionAlps, a joint venture of TMR and Swiss Federal Railways, operates services on the line.

== Service ==
RegionAlps operates hourly service between Martigny and Le Châble, with additional service at peak hours. This service is designated R81 and branded as the "Saint-Bernard Express." Connecting services, designated R82, run between Sembrancher and Orsières. This is supplemented in the winter months by the Verbier Express and VosAlps Express of Swiss Federal Railways, providing direct service from Geneva Airport and Fribourg/Freiburg, respectively.
