= Transports de Martigny et Régions =

The Transports de Martigny et Régions (TMR) company in the Valais canton of Switzerland operates bus and coach services and two electric railway lines:

- Martigny–Châtelard Railway (MC), 1,000 mm (3 ft 3 3/8 in) metre gauge, with the Mont-Blanc Express
- Martigny–Orsières Railway (MO), 1,435 mm (4 ft 8 1/2 in) standard gauge, with the Saint-Bernard Express

The company is the result of merging Martigny–Orsières Railway (MO) and the Martigny–Châtelard Railway (MC) in 2001 with the official date 2000-01-01 to form the Transports de Martigny et Régions.

RegionAlps is a joint venture between TMR and Swiss Federal Railways.

== See also ==
- List of companies of Switzerland
- Transport in Switzerland
