= Bouveret railway station =

Railway station in Port-Valais, Switzerland

Bouveret
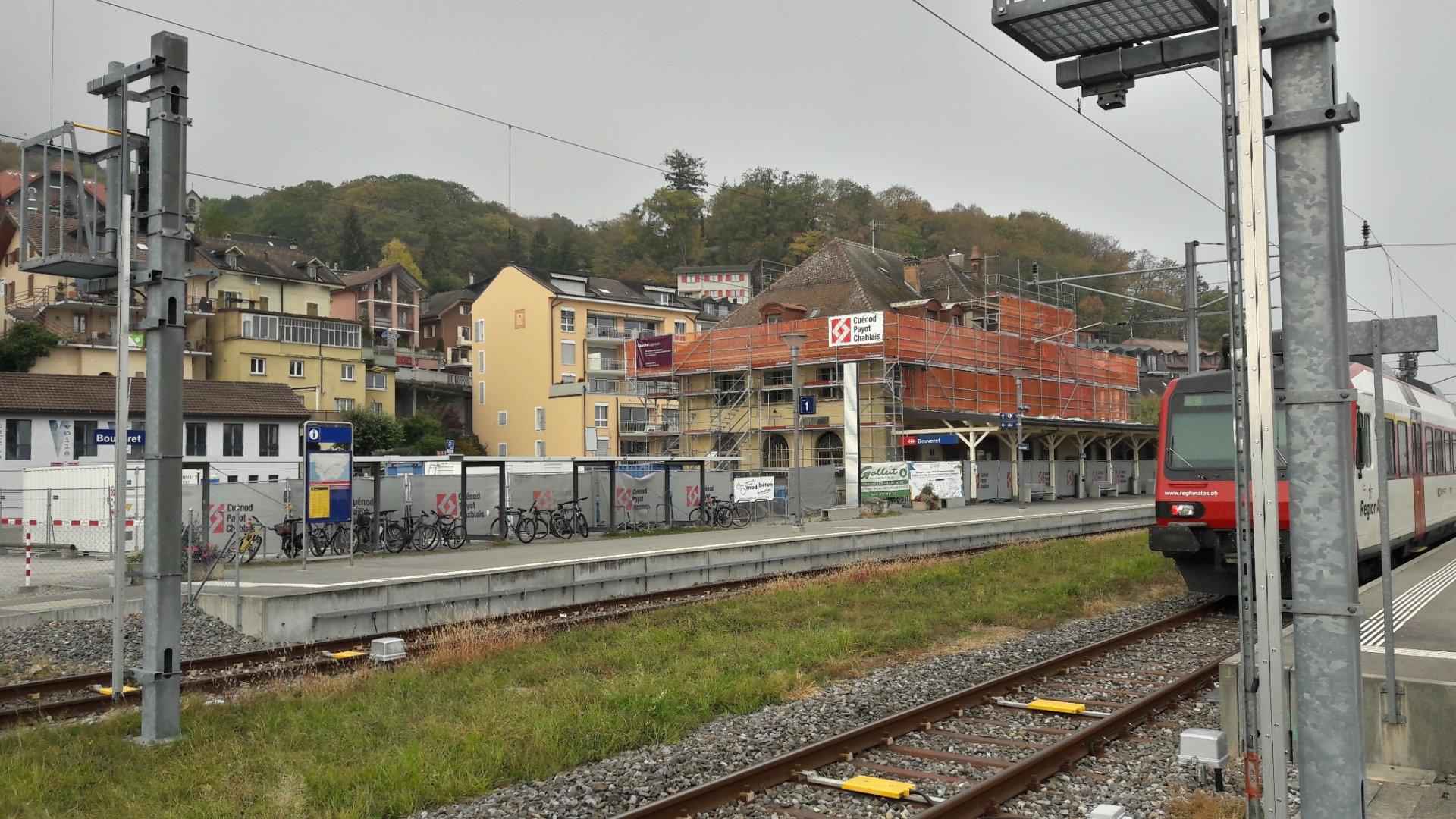
- The station building in 2018

General information
- Location: Port-Valais; Switzerland
- Coordinates: 46°23′09″N 6°51′12″E
- Elevation: 374 m (1,227 ft)
- Owner: Swiss Federal Railways
- Line: Saint-Gingolph–Saint-Maurice line
- Distance: 22.9 km (14.2 mi) from St-Maurice
- Platforms: 2 side platforms
- Tracks: 3
- Train operators: RegionAlps
- Connections: CGN ferries

Construction
- Parking: Yes (27 spaces)
- Cycle facilities: Yes (132 spaces)
- Accessible: Yes

Other information
- Station code: 8501426 (BOU)

Passengers
- 2023: 810 per weekday (RegionAlps)

Services
Preceding station	RegionAlps	Following station
St-Gingolph Terminus	R91	Les Evouettes towards Brig
Location

Bouveret railway station (French: Gare du Bouveret, German: Bahnhof Bouveret) is a railway station in the municipality of Port-Valais, in the Swiss canton of Valais. It is an intermediate stop on the Saint-Gingolph–Saint-Maurice line and is served by local trains only.

== Services ==
As of the December 2024 timetable change, the following services stop at Bouveret:

- Regio: hourly service between St-Gingolph and Brig.
