= Colombey =

Colombey may refer to:

- Colombey-les-Belles, Meurthe-et-Moselle, France
- Colombey-les-Deux-Églises, Haute-Marne, France, home of Charles de Gaulle

== See also ==
- Collombey-Muraz, a municipality in Valais, Switzerland
- Battle of Borny–Colombey, 1870 near Metz, part of the Franco–Prussian War
