= Nayes (Vouvry, Switzerland) =

Swiss locality

Coordinates: 46.33370°N 6.85106°E

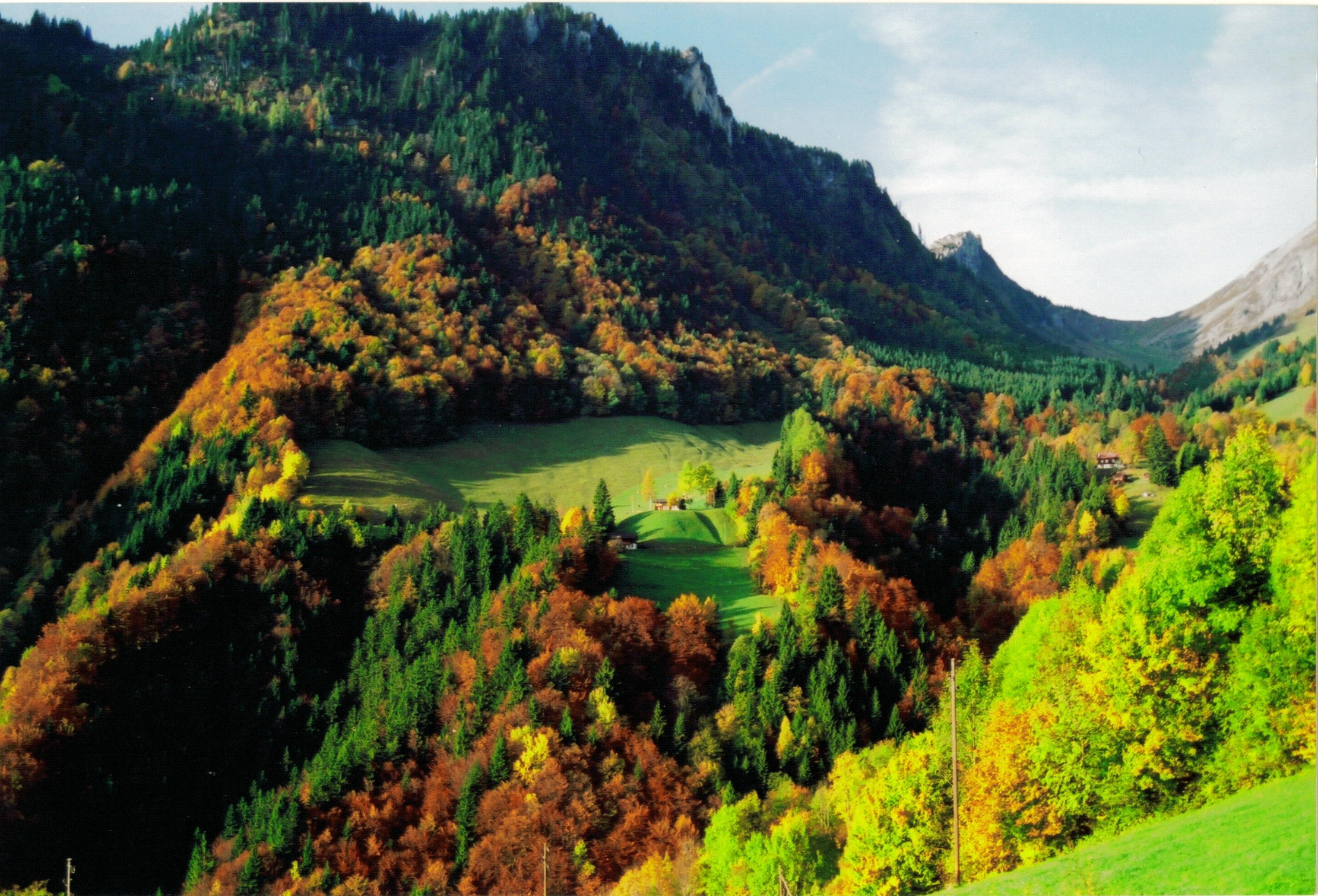
Nayes at the beginning of the autumn season

Nayes, also named "En Nayes", is a locality in the municipality of Vouvry, Switzerland.
