= Paddle steamer Genève =

Steam ship

Coordinates: 46.204838°N 6.154291°E

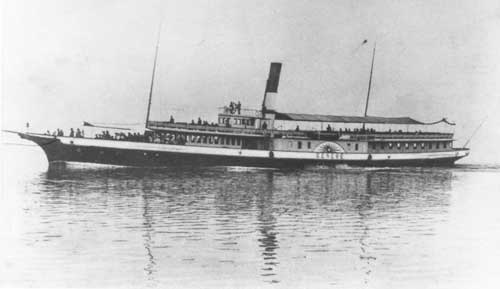
- Genève in 1896

History

Switzerland
- Name: Genève
- Namesake: Geneva
- Owner: Association pour le Bateau Genève
- Operator: Compagnie Générale de Navigation sur le lac Léman
- Builder: Sulzer
- Launched: 1896
- Recommissioned: 1934
- Decommissioned: 1973
- Fate: Docked since 1973

General characteristics
- Displacement: 334 tonnes
- Length: 63.40 m
- Beam: 13.95 m
- Draft: 1.60 m (1.84 loaded)
- Installed power: 1 890 shp
- Propulsion: Before 1934 refit; compound steam engine, 2 cylinders; After 1934 refit; 4-stroke diesel-electrical; Currently; None
- Speed: 14 knots (26 km/h)
- Capacity: 1 000

MS Genève is the oldest paddle ship of Lake Geneva. Originally a steamship, she became diesel powered in the 1930s.

Genève was built in 1896 by Sulzer for the Compagnie Générale de Navigation sur le lac Léman (CGN). She was launched for the Swiss national exhibition in Geneva.

Genève was the scene of the assassination of Elisabeth of Bavaria on 10 September 1898. Elizabeth was stabbed just before boarding the vessel in Geneva to travel to Montreux. The wounded Empress, came on board and the boat departed. But her condition was soon seen to be life-threatening, and Genève turned around to return her to the Hôtel Beau-Rivage, where she died shortly afterwards.

On 3 May 1928, near Pully, Genève collided with the Rhône. The left anchor of Genève became entangled in the rigging of the Rhône, breaking her bowsprit and figurehead, and snapping the top of the foremast. A passenger was killed by a falling piece of the foremast.

In 1934, Genève went under a refit, where her steam machinery was replaced with diesel engines. She was the first CGN ship to be converted to diesel.

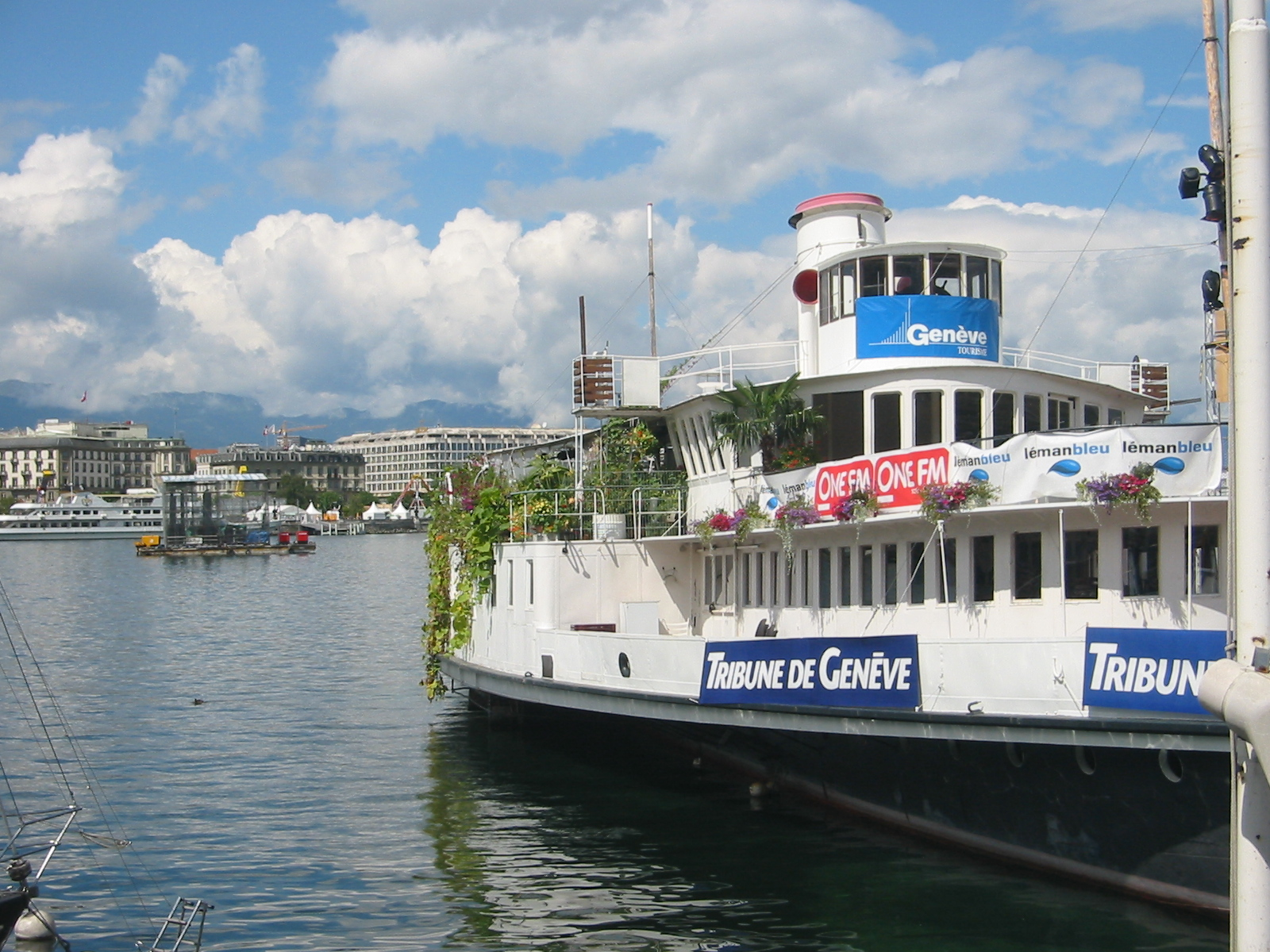
The Genève in 2006

In 1973, Genève was taken out of commission and sold for scrap. The next year, she was purchased by an "Association pour le Bateau Genève" for 75 000 CHF, and moored at Eaux-Vives dock. She is now unserviceable, but still afloat. During the summer months, the vessel is used as a restaurant, the Buvette du Bateau.

The name Genève was taken by a CGN swift boat on 31 October 2007.
