= Monthey District =

Coordinates: 46°16′13″N 6°54′09″E

Monthey District de Monthey
- District
- Flag Coat of arms
- Country: Switzerland
- Canton: Valais
- Capital: Monthey

Area
  - Total: 255.1 km^{2} (98.5 sq mi)

Population (2020)
  - Total: 47,912
  - Density: 187.8/km^{2} (486.4/sq mi)
- Time zone: UTC+1 (CET)
  - Summer (DST): UTC+2 (CEST)
- Municipalities: 9

The district of Monthey is a district of the canton of Valais in Switzerland. It has a population of 47,912 (as of 31 December 2020).

== Municipalities ==
It comprises the following municipalities:

Municipality	Population (31 December 2020)	Area km^{2}
Champéry	1,371	38.88
Collombey-Muraz	9,598	29.81
Monthey	17,820	28.63
Port-Valais	4,283	14.35
Saint-Gingolph	964	14.38
Troistorrents	4,806	36.98
Val-d'Illiez	2,074	39.26
Vionnaz	2,753	20.93
Vouvry	4,243	33.5
Total	47,912	256.72

== Coat of arms and flag ==
The blazon of the municipal coat of arms and flag is Or, issuant from coupeaux Vert an Oak-tree proper leaved and fructed of the second.

== Demographics ==
Monthey has a population (as of December 2020) of 47,912. In 2000, most of the population spoke French (29,275 or 87.7%) as their first language; German was the second most common (874 or 2.6%) and Italian was the third (808 or 2.4%). There were 14 people who speak Romansh.

As of 2008, the gender distribution of the population was 49.7% male and 50.3% female. The population was made up of 14,962 Swiss men (37.1% of the population) and 5,083 (12.6%) non-Swiss men. There were 15,820 Swiss women (39.2%) and 4,451 (11.0%) non-Swiss women. Of the population in the district 11,701 or about 35.0% were born in Monthey and lived there in 2000. There were 6,531 or 19.6% who were born in the same canton, while 6,988 or 20.9% were born somewhere else in Switzerland, and 7,108 or 21.3% were born outside of Switzerland.

As of 2000, there were 13,881 people who were single and never married in the district. There were 15,855 married individuals, 1,776 widows or widowers and 1,877 individuals who are divorced.

There were 4,354 households that consist of only one person and 922 households with five or more people. Out of a total of 13,809 households that answered this question, 31.5% were households made up of just one person and there were 105 adults who lived with their parents. Of the rest of the households, there are 3,322 married couples without children, 4,519 married couples with children There were 934 single parents with a child or children. There were 185 households that were made up of unrelated people and 390 households that were made up of some sort of institution or another collective housing.

The historical population is given in the following chart:

== Politics ==
In the 2007 federal election the most popular party was the CVP which received 32.18% of the vote. The next three most popular parties were the SVP (23.1%), the FDP (21.41%) and the SP (14.54%). In the federal election, a total of 11,622 votes were cast, and the voter turnout was 49.3%.

In the 2009 Conseil d'État/Staatsrat election a total of 9,264 votes were cast, of which 709 or about 7.7% were invalid. The voter participation was 39.3%, which is much less than the cantonal average of 54.67%. In the 2007 Swiss Council of States election a total of 11,250 votes were cast, of which 995 or about 8.8% were invalid. The voter participation was 48.7%, which is much less than the cantonal average of 59.88%.

== Religion ==
From the 2000 census, 23,500 or 70.4% were Roman Catholic, while 3,958 or 11.9% belonged to the Swiss Reformed Church. Of the rest of the population, there were 270 members of an Orthodox church (or about 0.81% of the population), there were 24 individuals (or about 0.07% of the population) who belonged to the Christian Catholic Church, and there were 693 individuals (or about 2.08% of the population) who belonged to another Christian church. There were 25 individuals (or about 0.07% of the population) who were Jewish, and 1,312 (or about 3.93% of the population) who were Islamic. There were 74 individuals who were Buddhist, 29 individuals who were Hindu and 39 individuals who belonged to another church. 2,211 (or about 6.62% of the population) belonged to no church, are agnostic or atheist, and 1,573 individuals (or about 4.71% of the population) did not answer the question.

== Education ==
In Monthey about 11,432 or (34.2%) of the population have completed non-mandatory upper secondary education, and 3,151 or (9.4%) have completed additional higher education (either University or a Fachhochschule). Of the 3,151 who completed tertiary schooling, 53.7% were Swiss men, 27.3% were Swiss women, 11.4% were non-Swiss men and 7.6% were non-Swiss women.
