= Les Evouettes railway station =

Railway station in Port-Valais, Switzerland

Les Evouettes
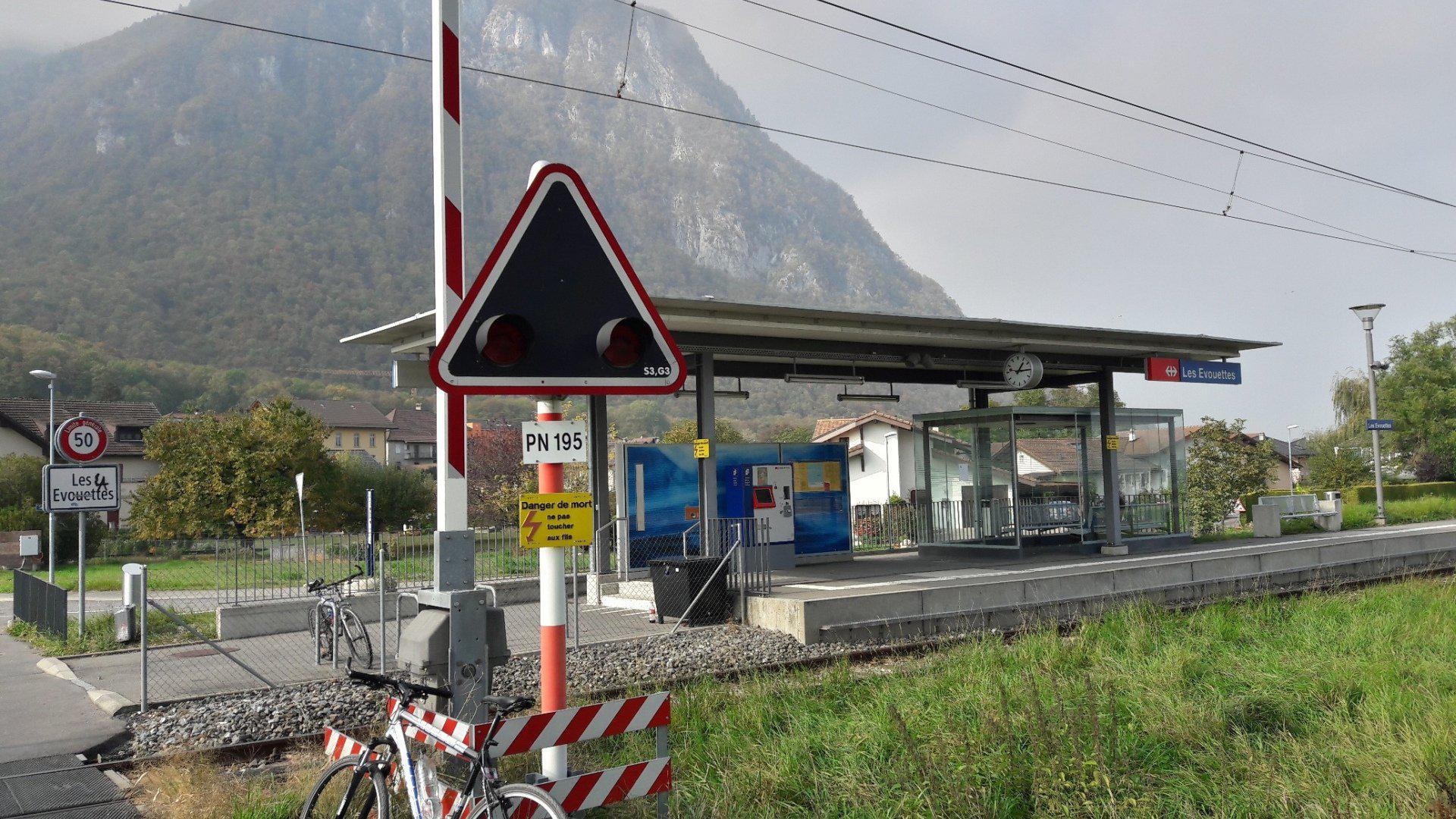
- The station platform in 2018

General information
- Location: Port-Valais; Switzerland
- Coordinates: 46°21′47″N 6°52′46″E
- Elevation: 375 m (1,230 ft)
- Owner: Swiss Federal Railways
- Line: Saint-Gingolph–Saint-Maurice line
- Distance: 19.5 km (12.1 mi) from St-Maurice
- Platforms: 1 side platform
- Tracks: 1
- Train operators: RegionAlps

Construction
- Cycle facilities: Yes (8 spaces)
- Accessible: Yes

Other information
- Station code: 8501425 (EVOU)

Passengers
- 2023: 170 per weekday (RegionAlps)

Services
Preceding station	RegionAlps	Following station
Bouveret towards St-Gingolph	R91	Vouvry towards Brig
Location

Les Evouettes railway station (French: Gare des Evouettes, German: Bahnhof Les Evouettes) is a railway station in the municipality of Port-Valais, in the Swiss canton of Valais. It is an intermediate stop on the Saint-Gingolph–Saint-Maurice line and is served by local trains only.

== Services ==
As of the December 2024 timetable change, the following services stop at Les Evouettes:

- Regio: hourly service between St-Gingolph and Brig.
