= Vionnaz =

- Municipality
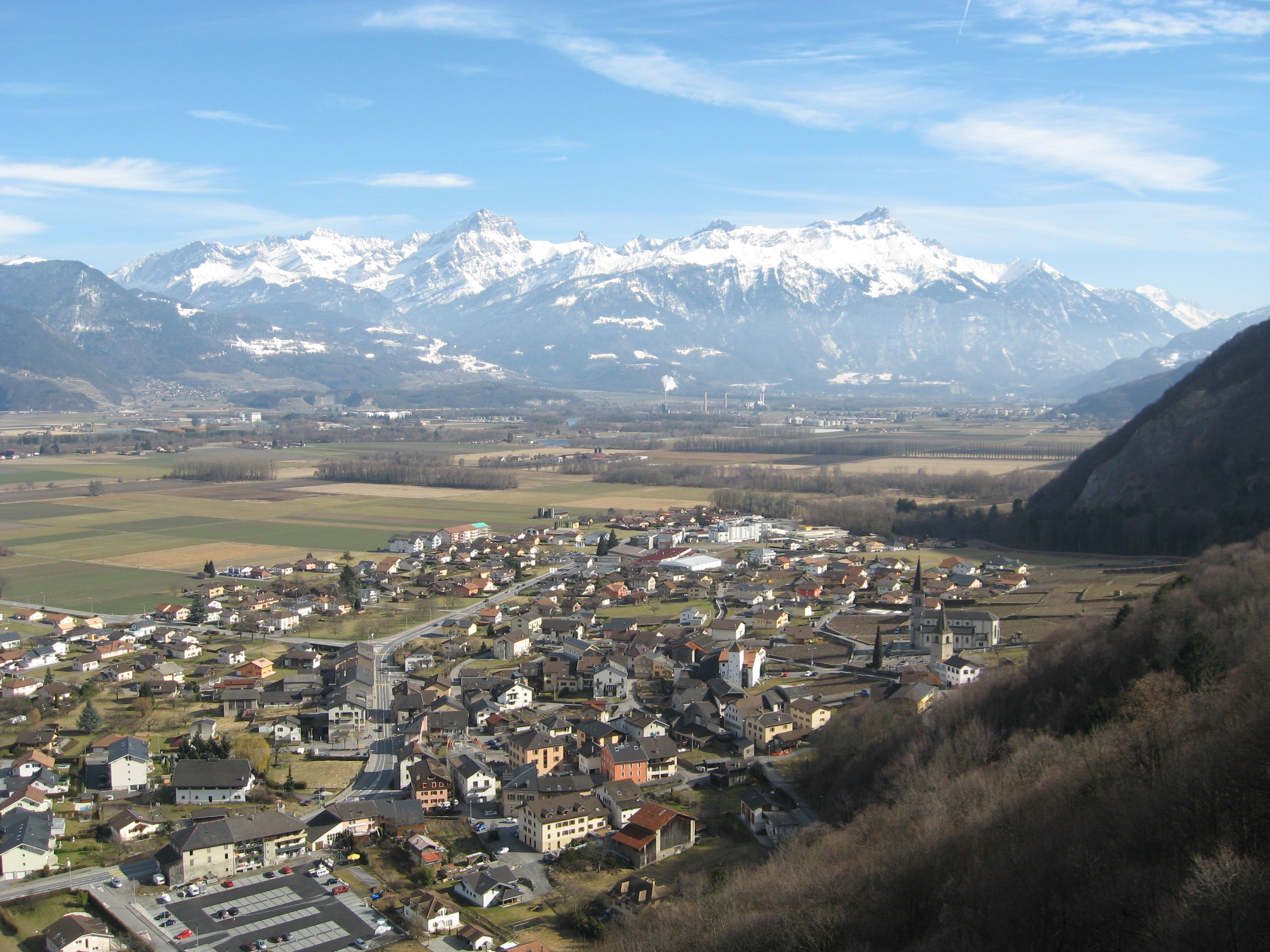
- Vionnaz village

- Flag Coat of arms
- Location of Vionnaz
- Location within Switzerland Location within Canton of Valais
- Coordinates: 46°19′N 6°54′E
- Country: Switzerland
- Canton: Valais
- District: Monthey

Government
  - Mayor: Alphonse-Marie Veuthey

Area
  - Total: 20.9 km^{2} (8.1 sq mi)
- Elevation: 392 m (1,286 ft)

Population (December 2002)
  - Total: 1,688
  - Density: 80.8/km^{2} (209/sq mi)
- Time zone: UTC+01:00 (CET)
  - Summer (DST): UTC+02:00 (CEST)
- Postal code: 1895
- SFOS number: 6158
- ISO 3166 code: CH-VS
- Surrounded by: Châtel (FR-74), Collombey-Muraz, La Chapelle-d'Abondance (FR-74), Vouvry
- Website: www.vionnaz.ch

Vionnaz is a municipality in the district of Monthey in the canton of Valais in Switzerland.

== Geography ==
Vionnaz has an area, as of 2009, of 20.9 square kilometers (8.1 mi^{2}). Of this area, 6.32 km^{2} (2.44 mi^{2}) or 30.2% is used for agricultural purposes, while 11.45 km^{2} (4.42 mi^{2}) or 54.7% is forested. Of the rest of the land, 1.48 km^{2} (0.57 mi^{2}) or 7.1% is settled (buildings or roads), 0.24 km^{2} (0.093 mi^{2}) or 1.1% is either rivers or lakes and 1.46 km^{2} (0.56 mi^{2}) or 7.0% is unproductive land.

Of the built up area, housing and buildings made up 3.2% and transportation infrastructure made up 2.6%. Out of the forested land, 49.1% of the total land area is heavily forested and 2.0% is covered with orchards or small clusters of trees. Of the agricultural land, 7.6% is used for growing crops and 4.2% is pastures, while 1.3% is used for orchards or vine crops and 17.0% is used for alpine pastures. All the water in the municipality is flowing water. Of the unproductive areas, 4.9% is unproductive vegetation and 2.1% is too rocky for vegetation.

== Coat of arms ==
The blazon of the municipal coat of arms is Quartered, Argent two bends Azure and Gules a Buck saliant Or.

== Demographics ==
Vionnaz has a population (as of December 2020) of 2,753. As of 2008, 15.9% of the population are resident foreign nationals. Over the last 10 years (2000–2010 ) the population has changed at a rate of 36.2%. It has changed at a rate of 32.6% due to migration and at a rate of 4.5% due to births and deaths.

Most of the population (as of 2000) speaks French (1,444 or 92.4%) as their first language, German is the second most common (56 or 3.6%) and Portuguese is the third (21 or 1.3%). There are 20 people who speak Italian and 2 people who speak Romansh.

As of 2008, the population was 50.7% male and 49.3% female. The population was made up of 913 Swiss men (42.0% of the population) and 188 (8.7%) non-Swiss men. There were 919 Swiss women (42.3%) and 153 (7.0%) non-Swiss women. Of the population in the municipality, 610 or about 39.1% were born in Vionnaz and lived there in 2000. There were 282 or 18.1% who were born in the same canton, while 414 or 26.5% were born somewhere else in Switzerland, and 200 or 12.8% were born outside of Switzerland.

As of 2000, children and teenagers (0–19 years old) make up 24.5% of the population, while adults (20–64 years old) make up 61.6% and seniors (over 64 years old) make up 13.9%.

As of 2000, there were 609 people who were single and never married in the municipality. There were 797 married individuals, 79 widows or widowers and 77 individuals who are divorced.

As of 2000, there were 623 private households in the municipality, and an average of 2.5 persons per household. There were 171 households that consist of only one person and 41 households with five or more people. In 2000, a total of 617 apartments (45.3% of the total) were permanently occupied, while 717 apartments (52.6%) were seasonally occupied and 28 apartments (2.1%) were empty. As of 2009, the construction rate of new housing units was 9.7 new units per 1000 residents.

The historical population is given in the following chart:

== Sights ==
The entire village of Vionnaz is designated as part of the Inventory of Swiss Heritage Sites.

== Politics ==
In the 2007 federal election the most popular party was the CVP which received 42.62% of the vote. The next three most popular parties were the SVP (22.64%), the SP (15.26%) and the FDP (10.66%). In the federal election, a total of 689 votes were cast, and the voter turnout was 50.3%.

In the 2009 Conseil d'Etat/Staatsrat election a total of 563 votes were cast, of which 37 or about 6.6% were invalid. The voter participation was 40.3%, which is much less than the cantonal average of 54.67%. In the 2007 Swiss Council of States election a total of 671 votes were cast, of which 58 or about 8.6% were invalid. The voter participation was 49.9%, which is much less than the cantonal average of 59.88%.

== Economy ==
As of 2010, Vionnaz had an unemployment rate of 4.3%. As of 2008, there were 45 people employed in the primary economic sector and about 14 businesses involved in this sector. 549 people were employed in the secondary sector and there were 34 businesses in this sector. 266 people were employed in the tertiary sector, with 64 businesses in this sector. There were 753 residents of the municipality who were employed in some capacity, of which females made up 39.2% of the workforce.

In 2008 the total number of full-time equivalent jobs was 760. The number of jobs in the primary sector was 31, of which 22 were in agriculture and 9 were in fishing or fisheries. The number of jobs in the secondary sector was 510 of which 339 or (66.5%) were in manufacturing and 170 (33.3%) were in construction. The number of jobs in the tertiary sector was 219. In the tertiary sector; 71 or 32.4% were in wholesale or retail sales or the repair of motor vehicles, 17 or 7.8% were in the movement and storage of goods, 34 or 15.5% were in a hotel or restaurant, 5 or 2.3% were in the information industry, 11 or 5.0% were the insurance or financial industry, 6 or 2.7% were technical professionals or scientists, 32 or 14.6% were in education and 7 or 3.2% were in health care.

In 2000, there were 492 workers who commuted into the municipality and 499 workers who commuted away. The municipality is a net exporter of workers, with about 1.0 workers leaving the municipality for every one entering. About 12.0% of the workforce coming into Vionnaz are coming from outside Switzerland. Of the working population, 11.7% used public transportation to get to work, and 68.8% used a private car.

== Religion ==
From the 2000 census, 1,170 or 74.9% were Roman Catholic, while 217 or 13.9% belonged to the Swiss Reformed Church. Of the rest of the population, there were 4 members of an Orthodox church (or about 0.26% of the population), and there were 13 individuals (or about 0.83% of the population) who belonged to another Christian church. There were 2 individuals (or about 0.13% of the population) who were Jewish, and 6 (or about 0.38% of the population) who were Islamic. There were 3 individuals who were Buddhist, 1 person who was Hindu and 1 individual who belonged to another church. 90 (or about 5.76% of the population) belonged to no church, are agnostic or atheist, and 61 individuals (or about 3.91% of the population) did not answer the question.

== Education ==
In Vionnaz about 602 or (38.5%) of the population have completed non-mandatory upper secondary education, and 147 or (9.4%) have completed additional higher education (either university or an Haute école specialisée). Of the 147 who completed tertiary schooling, 65.3% were Swiss men, 28.6% were Swiss women, 4.8% were non-Swiss men.

As of 2000, there was one student in Vionnaz who came from another municipality, while 96 residents attended schools outside the municipality.

Vionnaz is home to the Bibliothèque communale library. The library has (as of 2008) 11,481 books or other media, and loaned out 13,851 items in the same year. It was open a total of 124 days with average of 9 hours per week during that year.
