= Port-Valais =

- Municipality
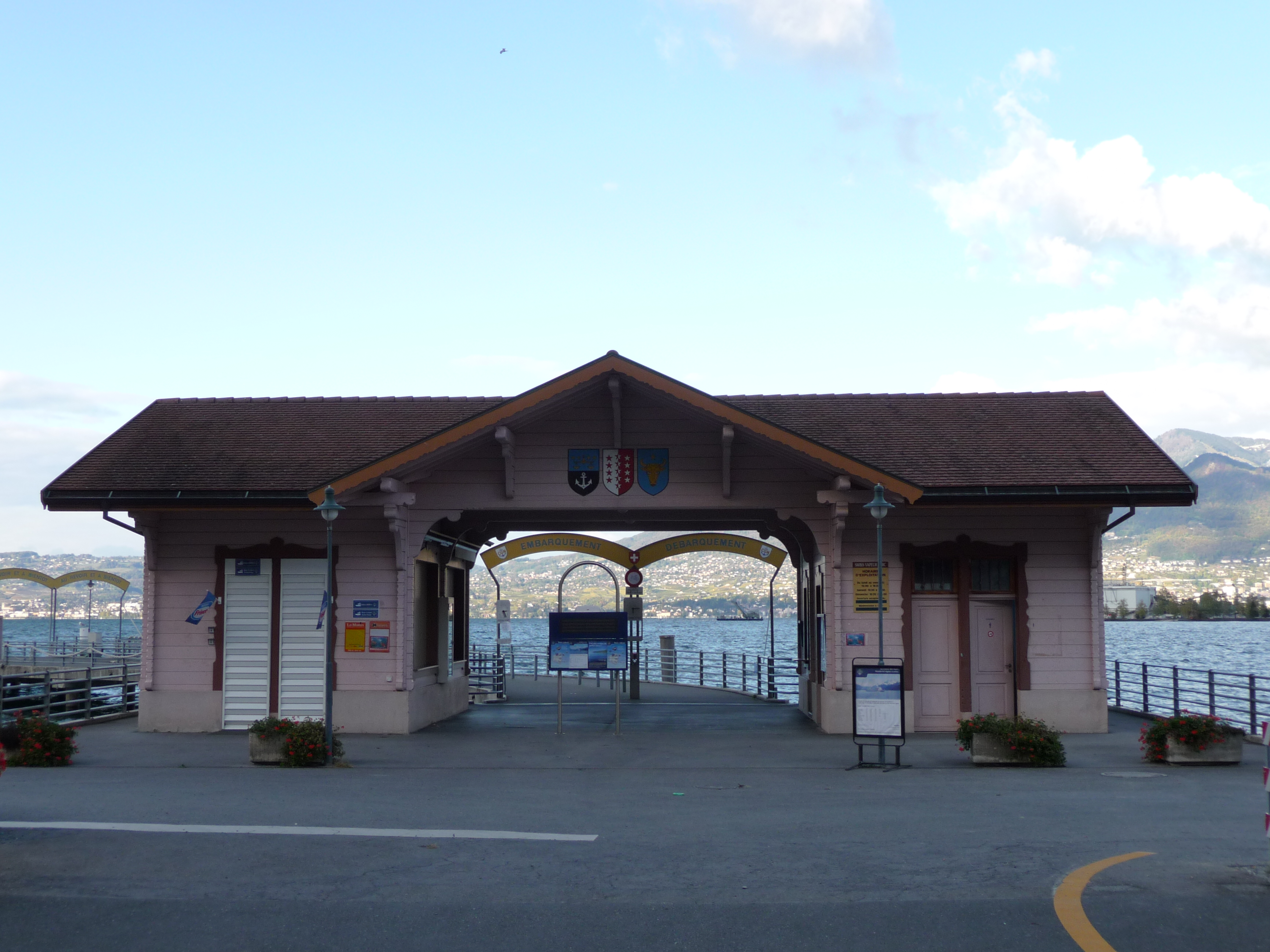
- Port-Valais dock

- Flag Coat of arms
- Location of Port-Valais
- Location within Switzerland Location within Canton of Valais
- Coordinates: 46°22′N 6°52′E
- Country: Switzerland
- Canton: Valais
- District: Monthey

Area
  - Total: 14.4 km^{2} (5.6 sq mi)
- Elevation: 390 m (1,280 ft)

Population (2002)
  - Total: 2,817
  - Density: 196/km^{2} (507/sq mi)
- Time zone: UTC+01:00 (CET)
  - Summer (DST): UTC+02:00 (CEST)
- Postal code: 1897
- SFOS number: 6154
- ISO 3166 code: CH-VS
- Localities: Le Bouveret, Les Evouettes
- Surrounded by: Chessel (VD), Noville (VD), Saint-Gingolph, Vevey (VD), Vouvry
- Website: www.port-valais.ch

Port-Valais (French pronunciation: [pɔʁ valɛ]) is a municipality of the district of Monthey in the French-speaking part of the canton of Valais in Switzerland.

== History ==
Port-Valais is first mentioned in 1180 as ad porvalesium. The municipality was formerly known by its German name Portwallis, however, that name is no longer used.

== Geography ==
Port-Valais has an area, as of 2009, of 14.4 square kilometers (5.6 mi^{2}). Of this area, 3.37 km^{2} (1.30 mi^{2}) or 23.5% is used for agricultural purposes, while 7.68 km^{2} (2.97 mi^{2}) or 53.5% is forested. Of the rest of the land, 1.7 km^{2} (0.66 mi^{2}) or 11.8% is settled (buildings or roads), 0.44 km^{2} (0.17 mi^{2}) or 3.1% is either rivers or lakes and 1.13 km^{2} (0.44 mi^{2}) or 7.9% is unproductive land.

Of the built up area, housing and buildings made up 4.9% and transportation infrastructure made up 3.8%. Power and water infrastructure as well as other special developed areas made up 1.3% of the area while parks, green belts and sports fields made up 1.1%. Out of the forested land, 51.5% of the total land area is heavily forested and 1.4% is covered with orchards or small clusters of trees. Of the agricultural land, 16.3% is used for growing crops and 2.6% is pastures, while 1.5% is used for orchards or vine crops and 3.0% is used for alpine pastures. Of the water in the municipality, 0.5% is in lakes and 2.6% is in rivers and streams. Of the unproductive areas, 3.8% is unproductive vegetation and 4.0% is too rocky for vegetation.

The municipality is located in the Monthey district, at the mouth of the Rhone into Lake Geneva. It consists of the villages of Le Bouveret and Les Evouettes and the hamlet of Port-Valais.

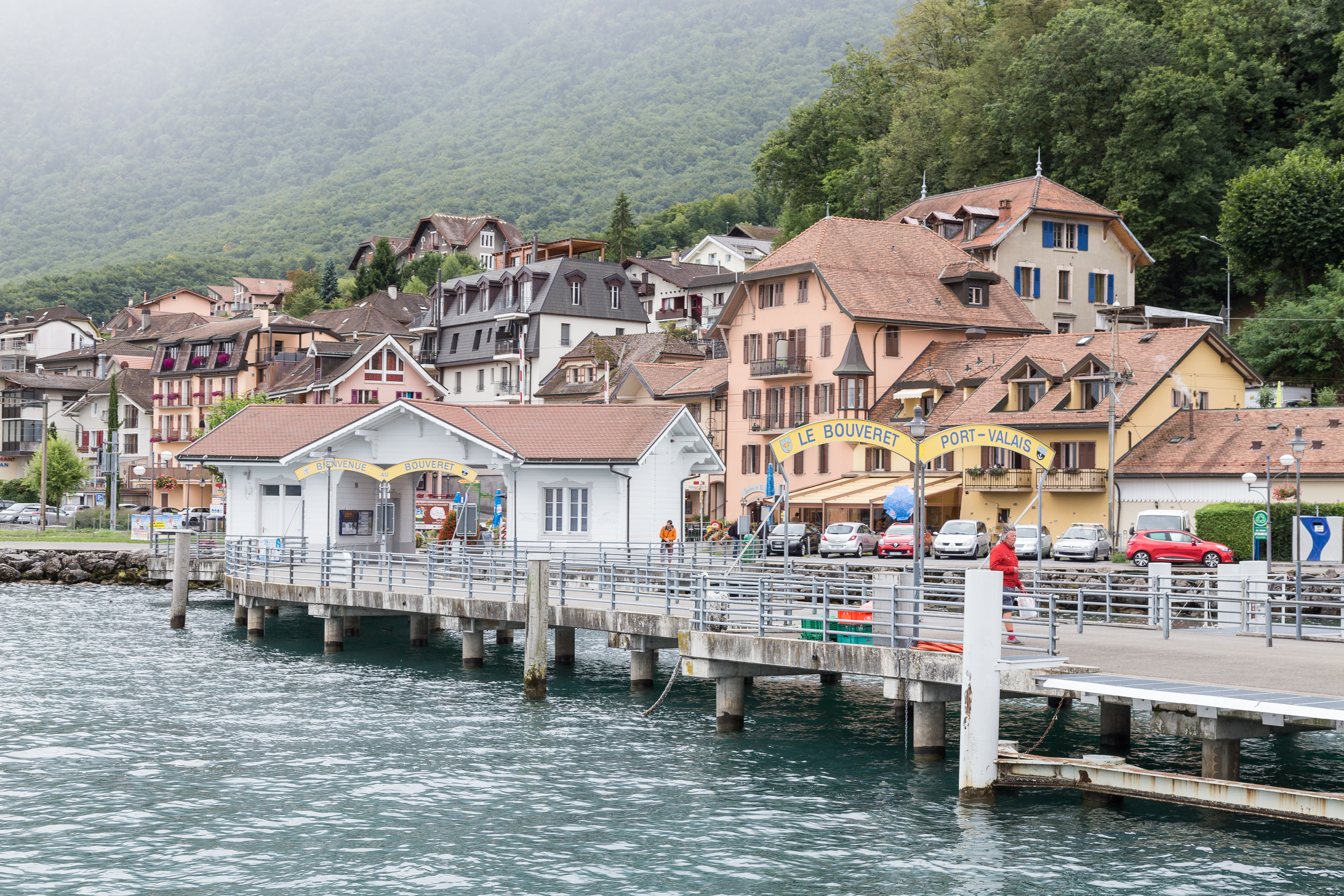
Le Bouveret - Port Valais

== Coat of arms ==
The blazon of the municipal coat of arms is Per fess Azure Scales between four Mullets of Five in fess Or and Sable an Anchor Argent.

== Demographics ==
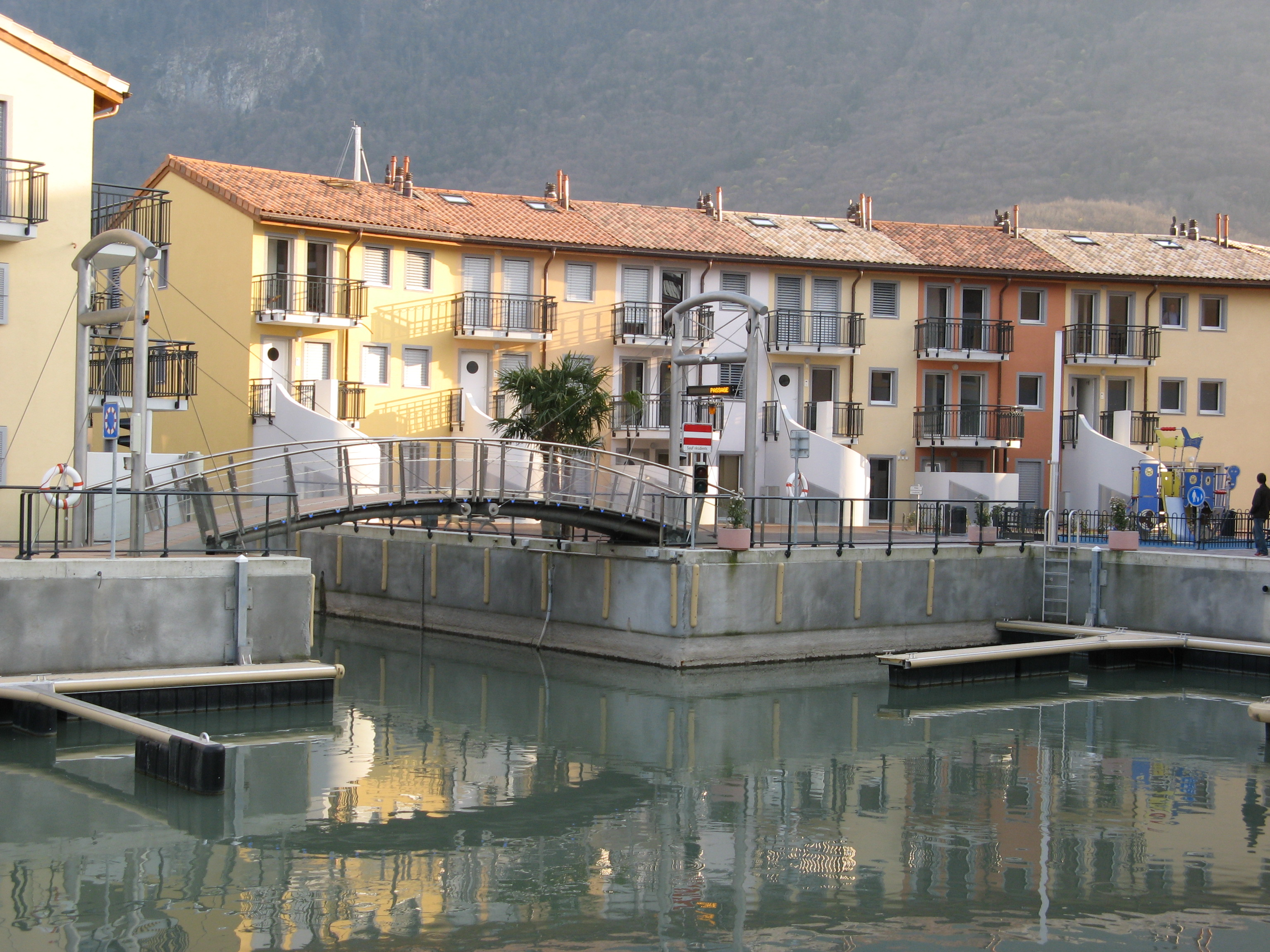
Houses in Le Bouveret

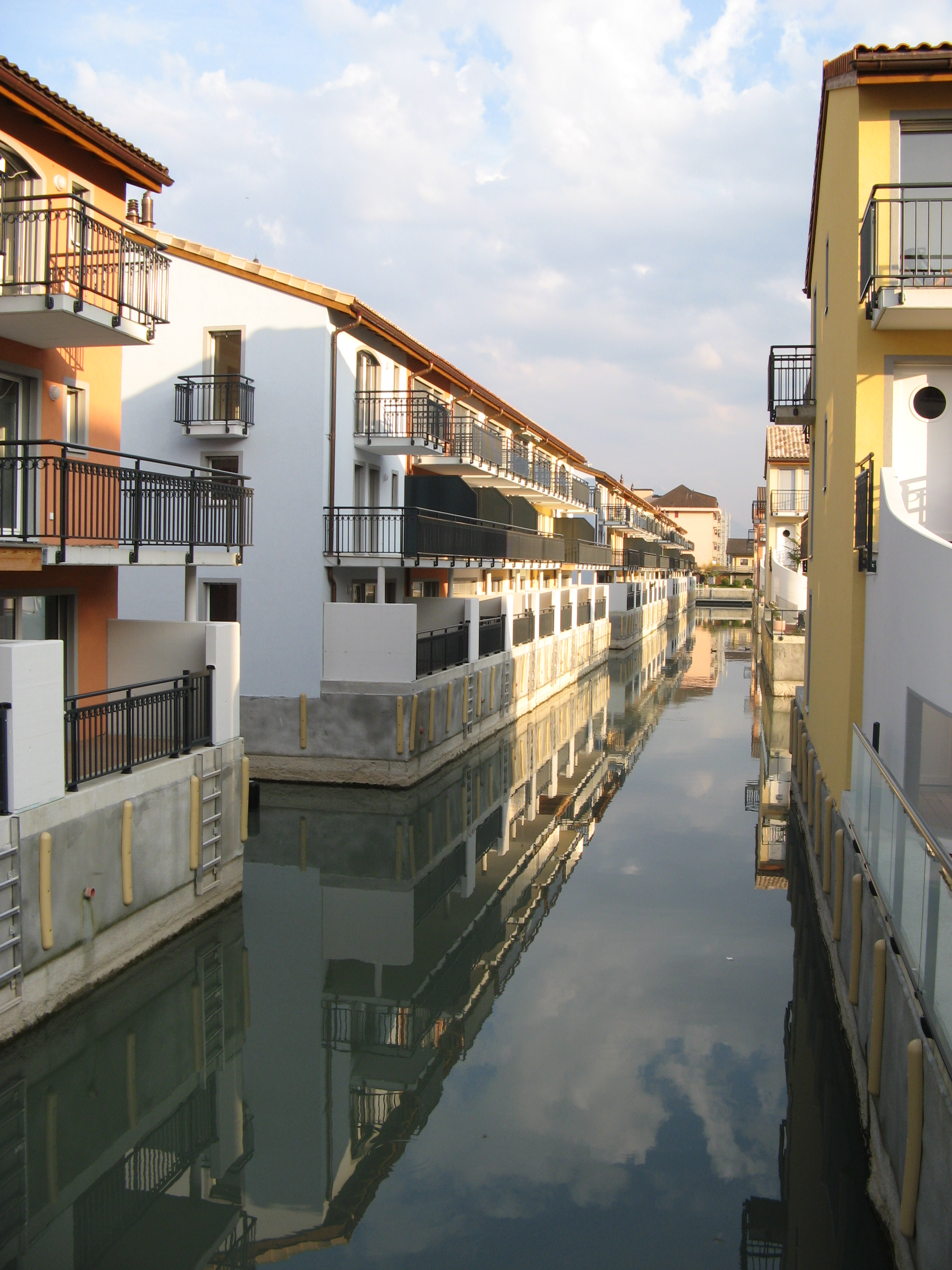
Canal in Le Bouveret

Port-Valais has a population (as of December 2020) of 4,283. As of 2008, 28.1% of the population are resident foreign nationals. Over the last 10 years (2000–2010 ) the population has changed at a rate of 26.1%. It has changed at a rate of 27.9% due to migration and at a rate of 2.5% due to births and deaths.

Most of the population (as of 2000) speaks French (1,903 or 80.5%) as their first language, German is the second most common (107 or 4.5%) and English is the third (54 or 2.3%). There are 32 people who speak Italian.

As of 2008, the population was 50.4% male and 49.6% female. The population was made up of 1,129 Swiss men (35.5% of the population) and 472 (14.9%) non-Swiss men. There were 1,138 Swiss women (35.8%) and 438 (13.8%) non-Swiss women. Of the population in the municipality, 677 or about 28.6% were born in Port-Valais and lived there in 2000. There were 343 or 14.5% who were born in the same canton, while 684 or 28.9% were born somewhere else in Switzerland, and 638 or 27.0% were born outside of Switzerland.

As of 2000, children and teenagers (0–19 years old) make up 25.3% of the population, while adults (20–64 years old) make up 63.5% and seniors (over 64 years old) make up 11.2%.

As of 2000, there were 1,076 people who were single and never married in the municipality. There were 1,023 married individuals, 127 widows or widowers and 138 individuals who are divorced.

As of 2000, there were 922 private households in the municipality, and an average of 2.2 persons per household. There were 357 households that consist of only one person and 45 households with five or more people. In 2000, a total of 715 apartments (64.0% of the total) were permanently occupied, while 383 apartments (34.3%) were seasonally occupied and 19 apartments (1.7%) were empty. As of 2009, the construction rate of new housing units was 1.3 new units per 1000 residents. The vacancy rate for the municipality, in 2010, was 0.4%.

The historical population is given in the following chart:

== Politics ==
In the 2007 federal election the most popular party was the CVP which received 33.53% of the vote. The next three most popular parties were the SVP (23.78%), the FDP (21.11%) and the SP (12.24%). In the federal election, a total of 881 votes were cast, and the voter turnout was 49.6%.

In the 2009 Conseil d'État/Staatsrat election a total of 790 votes were cast, of which 53 or about 6.7% were invalid. The voter participation was 43.7%, which is much less than the cantonal average of 54.67%. In the 2007 Swiss Council of States election a total of 852 votes were cast, of which 74 or about 8.7% were invalid. The voter participation was 48.5%, which is much less than the cantonal average of 59.88%.

== Economy ==
As of 2010, Port-Valais had an unemployment rate of 4.4%. As of 2008, there were 28 people employed in the primary economic sector and about 12 businesses involved in this sector. 134 people were employed in the secondary sector and there were 22 businesses in this sector. 467 people were employed in the tertiary sector, with 78 businesses in this sector. There were 1,061 residents of the municipality who were employed in some capacity, of which females made up 42.4% of the workforce.

In 2008 the total number of full-time equivalent jobs was 504. The number of jobs in the primary sector was 20, of which 19 were in agriculture and 1 was in fishing or fisheries. The number of jobs in the secondary sector was 127 of which 58 or (45.7%) were in manufacturing, 34 or (26.8%) were in mining and 36 (28.3%) were in construction. The number of jobs in the tertiary sector was 357. In the tertiary sector; 61 or 17.1% were in wholesale or retail sales or the repair of motor vehicles, 27 or 7.6% were in the movement and storage of goods, 66 or 18.5% were in a hotel or restaurant, 5 or 1.4% were in the information industry, 4 or 1.1% were the insurance or financial industry, 13 or 3.6% were technical professionals or scientists, 81 or 22.7% were in education and 13 or 3.6% were in health care.

In 2000, there were 374 workers who commuted into the municipality and 708 workers who commuted away. The municipality is a net exporter of workers, with about 1.9 workers leaving the municipality for every one entering. About 20.9% of the workforce coming into Port-Valais are coming from outside Switzerland. Of the working population, 8.5% used public transportation to get to work, and 74.4% used a private car.

== Religion ==
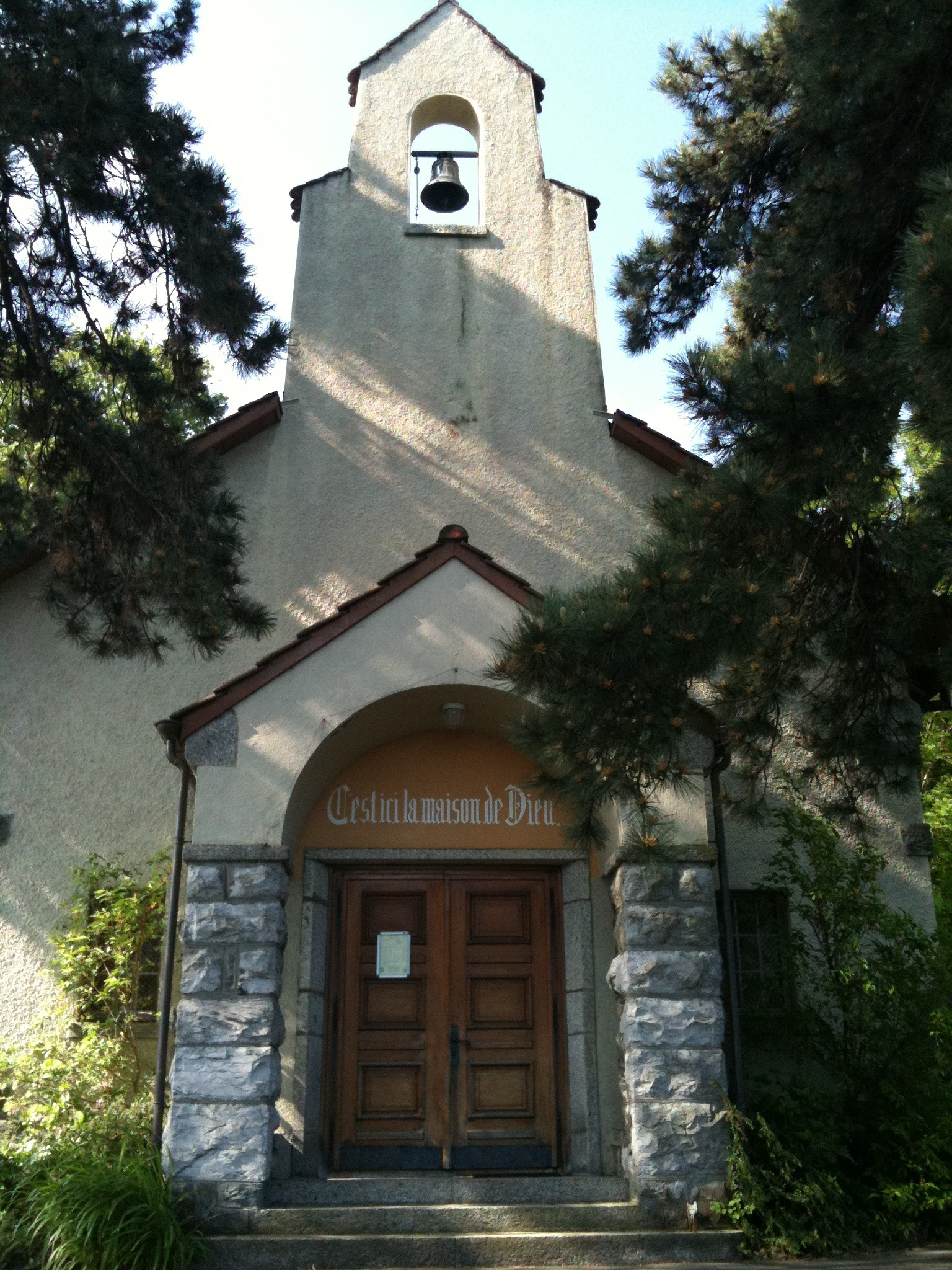
Reformed church in Le Bouveret

From the 2000 census, 1,418 or 60.0% were Roman Catholic, while 442 or 18.7% belonged to the Swiss Reformed Church. Of the rest of the population, there were 32 members of an Orthodox church (or about 1.35% of the population), there were 4 individuals (or about 0.17% of the population) who belonged to the Christian Catholic Church, and there were 46 individuals (or about 1.95% of the population) who belonged to another Christian church. There were 8 individuals (or about 0.34% of the population) who were Jewish, and 109 (or about 4.61% of the population) who were Islamic. There were 15 individuals who were Buddhist, 9 individuals who were Hindu and 8 individuals who belonged to another church. 255 (or about 10.79% of the population) belonged to no church, are agnostic or atheist, and 39 individuals (or about 1.65% of the population) did not answer the question.

== Education ==
In Port-Valais about 832 or (35.2%) of the population have completed non-mandatory upper secondary education, and 229 or (9.7%) have completed additional higher education (either university or a Fachhochschule). Of the 229 who completed tertiary schooling, 50.7% were Swiss men, 27.9% were Swiss women, 15.7% were non-Swiss men and 5.7% were non-Swiss women.

As of 2000, there were 16 students in Port-Valais who came from another municipality, while 125 residents attended schools outside the municipality.
