= Vouvry =

- Municipality
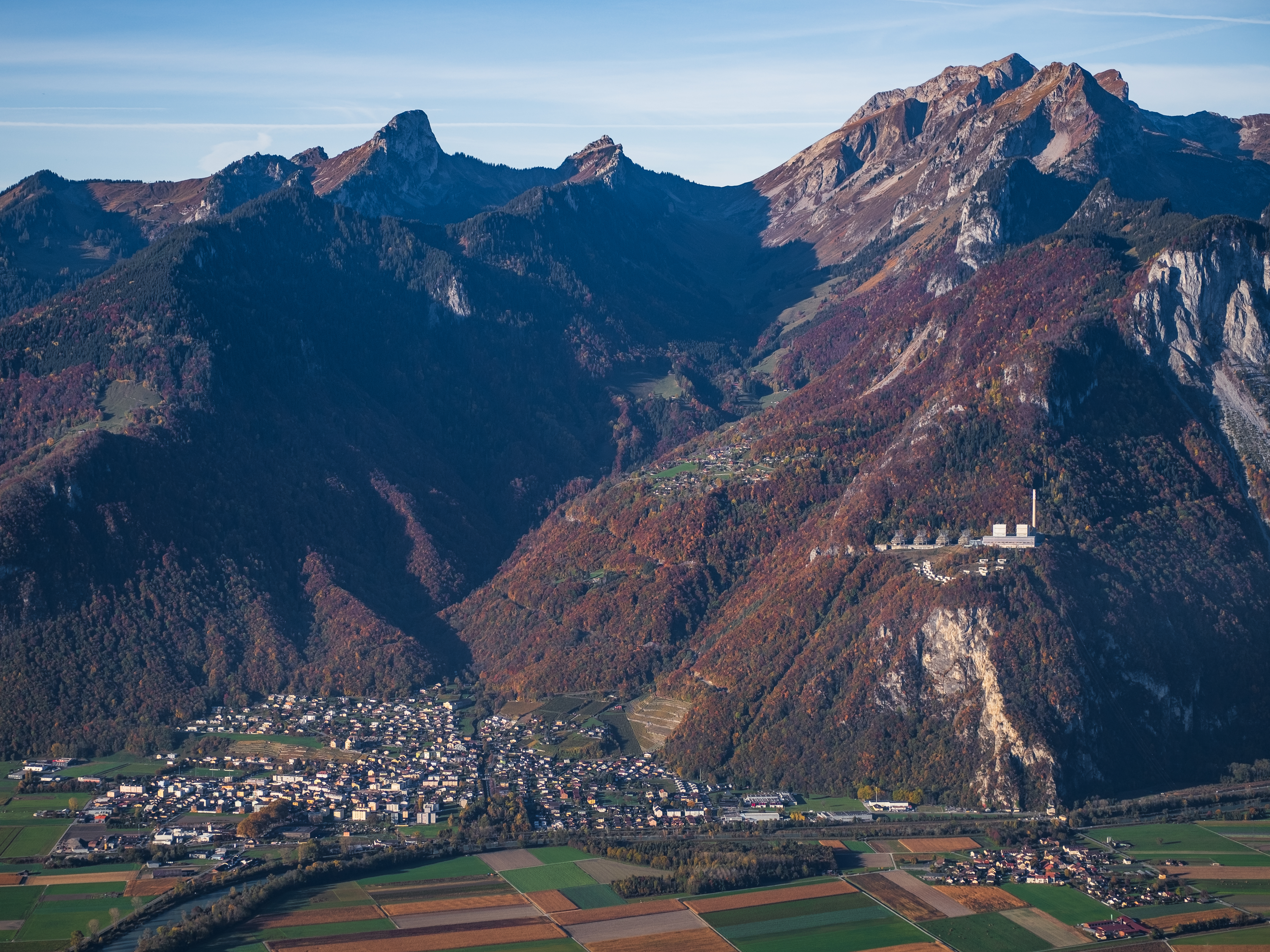
- Vouvry as seen from Corbeyrier in 2021.

- Flag Coat of arms
- Location of Vouvry
- Location within Switzerland Location within Canton of Valais
- Coordinates: 46°20′N 6°53′E
- Country: Switzerland
- Canton: Valais
- District: Monthey

Government
  - Mayor: Reynold Rinaldi

Area
  - Total: 33.5 km^{2} (12.9 sq mi)
- Elevation: 387 m (1,270 ft)

Population (December 2002)
  - Total: 3,223
  - Density: 96.2/km^{2} (249/sq mi)
- Time zone: UTC+01:00 (CET)
  - Summer (DST): UTC+02:00 (CEST)
- Postal code: 1896
- SFOS number: 6159
- ISO 3166 code: CH-VS
- Localities: Vouvry, Porte du Scex, Miex, Taney
- Surrounded by: Aigle (VD), Chessel (VD), Collombey-Muraz, La Chapelle-d'Abondance (FR-74), Novel (FR-74), Port-Valais, Saint-Gingolph, Vionnaz, Yvorne (VD)
- Twin towns: Bodnegg (Germany)
- Website: www.vouvry.ch

Vouvry (French pronunciation: [vuvʁi]) is a municipality in the district of Monthey in the canton of Valais in Switzerland.

== History ==
Aerial view (1971)

Vouvry is first mentioned in 1018 as Vobreium and Wovregium.

== Geography ==
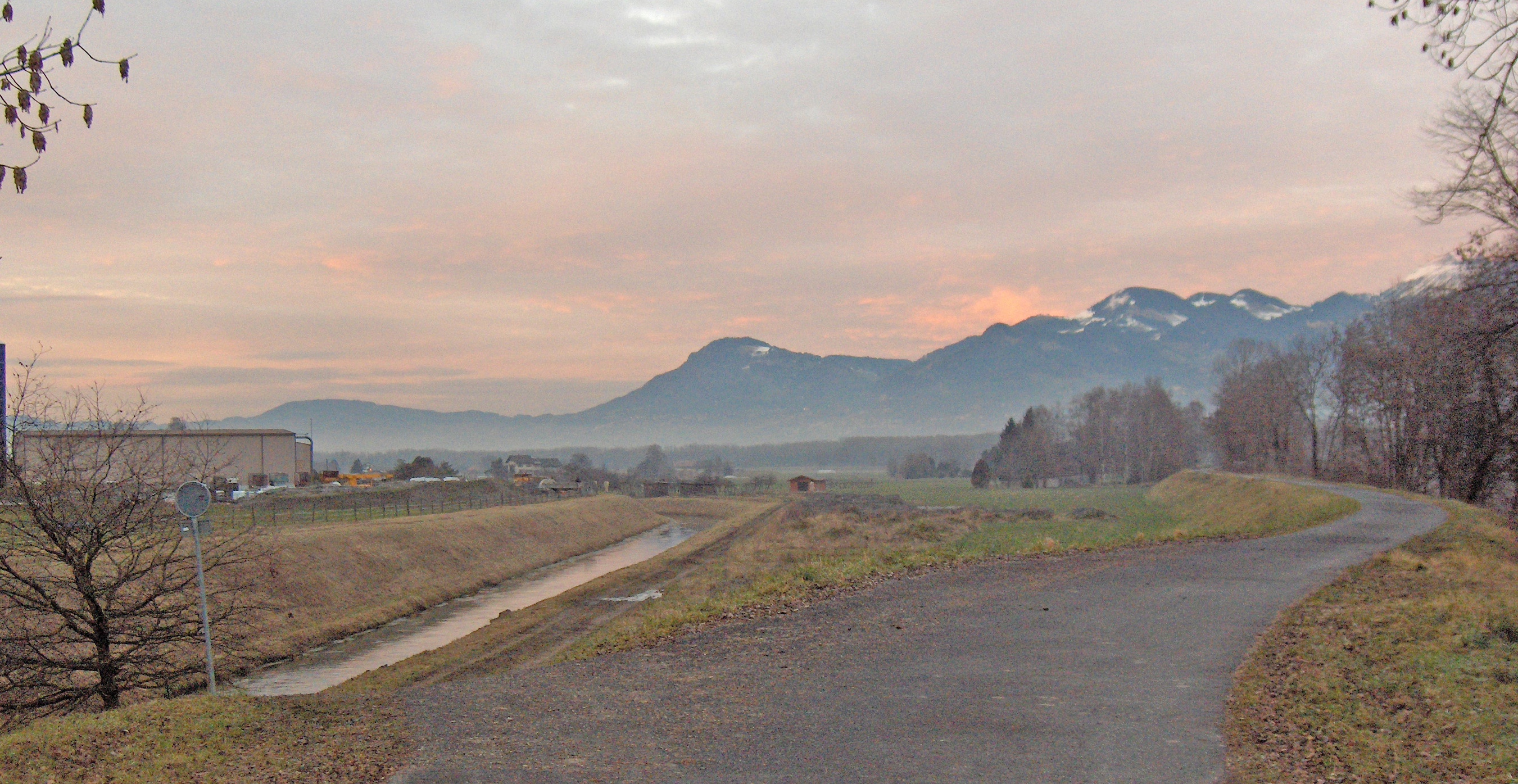
Stockalper canal between Vouvry and Les Évouettes

Vouvry has an area, as of 2009, of 33.5 square kilometers (12.9 mi^{2}). Of this area, 12.13 km^{2} (4.68 mi^{2}) or 36.2% is used for agricultural purposes, while 12.88 km^{2} (4.97 mi^{2}) or 38.4% is forested. Of the rest of the land, 1.97 km^{2} (0.76 mi^{2}) or 5.9% is settled (buildings or roads), 0.45 km^{2} (0.17 mi^{2}) or 1.3% is either rivers or lakes and 6.05 km^{2} (2.34 mi^{2}) or 18.1% is unproductive land.

Of the built up area, housing and buildings made up 2.7% and transportation infrastructure made up 1.8%. Out of the forested land, 34.8% of the total land area is heavily forested and 2.1% is covered with orchards or small clusters of trees. Of the agricultural land, 12.4% is used for growing crops and 2.2% is pastures and 20.5% is used for alpine pastures. Of the water in the municipality, 0.4% is in lakes and 0.9% is in rivers and streams. Of the unproductive areas, 9.2% is unproductive vegetation and 8.8% is too rocky for vegetation.

The municipality includes the village of Vouvry as well as Porte du Scex along the Rhône river and the villages of Miex and Taney on the slopes of Le Grammont.

== Coat of arms ==
The blazon of the municipal coat of arms is Per fess Gules an Eagle displayed Sable beaked, langued and membered Argent ensigned a cross couped of the last, and Azure three Mullets of Five, two and one.

== Demographics ==
Vouvry has a population (as of December 2020) of 4,243. As of 2008, 22.2% of the population are resident foreign nationals. Over the last 10 years (2000–2010 ) the population has changed at a rate of 19.3%. It has changed at a rate of 20.1% due to migration and at a rate of 2% due to births and deaths.

Most of the population (as of 2000) speaks French (2,549 or 86.1%) as their first language, German is the second most common (100 or 3.4%) and Albanian is the third (88 or 3.0%). There are 54 people who speak Italian.

As of 2008, the population was 49.5% male and 50.5% female. The population was made up of 1,370 Swiss men (38.2% of the population) and 406 (11.3%) non-Swiss men. There were 1,414 Swiss women (39.4%) and 397 (11.1%) non-Swiss women. Of the population in the municipality, 975 or about 32.9% were born in Vouvry and lived there in 2000. There were 442 or 14.9% who were born in the same canton, while 746 or 25.2% were born somewhere else in Switzerland, and 703 or 23.8% were born outside of Switzerland.

As of 2000, children and teenagers (0–19 years old) make up 26.9% of the population, while adults (20–64 years old) make up 58% and seniors (over 64 years old) make up 15%.

As of 2000, there were 1,180 people who were single and never married in the municipality. There were 1,427 married individuals, 174 widows or widowers and 179 individuals who are divorced.

As of 2000, there were 1,121 private households in the municipality, and an average of 2.5 persons per household. There were 327 households that consist of only one person and 104 households with five or more people. In 2000, a total of 1,081 apartments (77.7% of the total) were permanently occupied, while 238 apartments (17.1%) were seasonally occupied and 72 apartments (5.2%) were empty. As of 2009, the construction rate of new housing units was 10.3 new units per 1000 residents. The vacancy rate for the municipality, in 2010, was 0.61%.

The historical population is given in the following chart:

== Sights ==
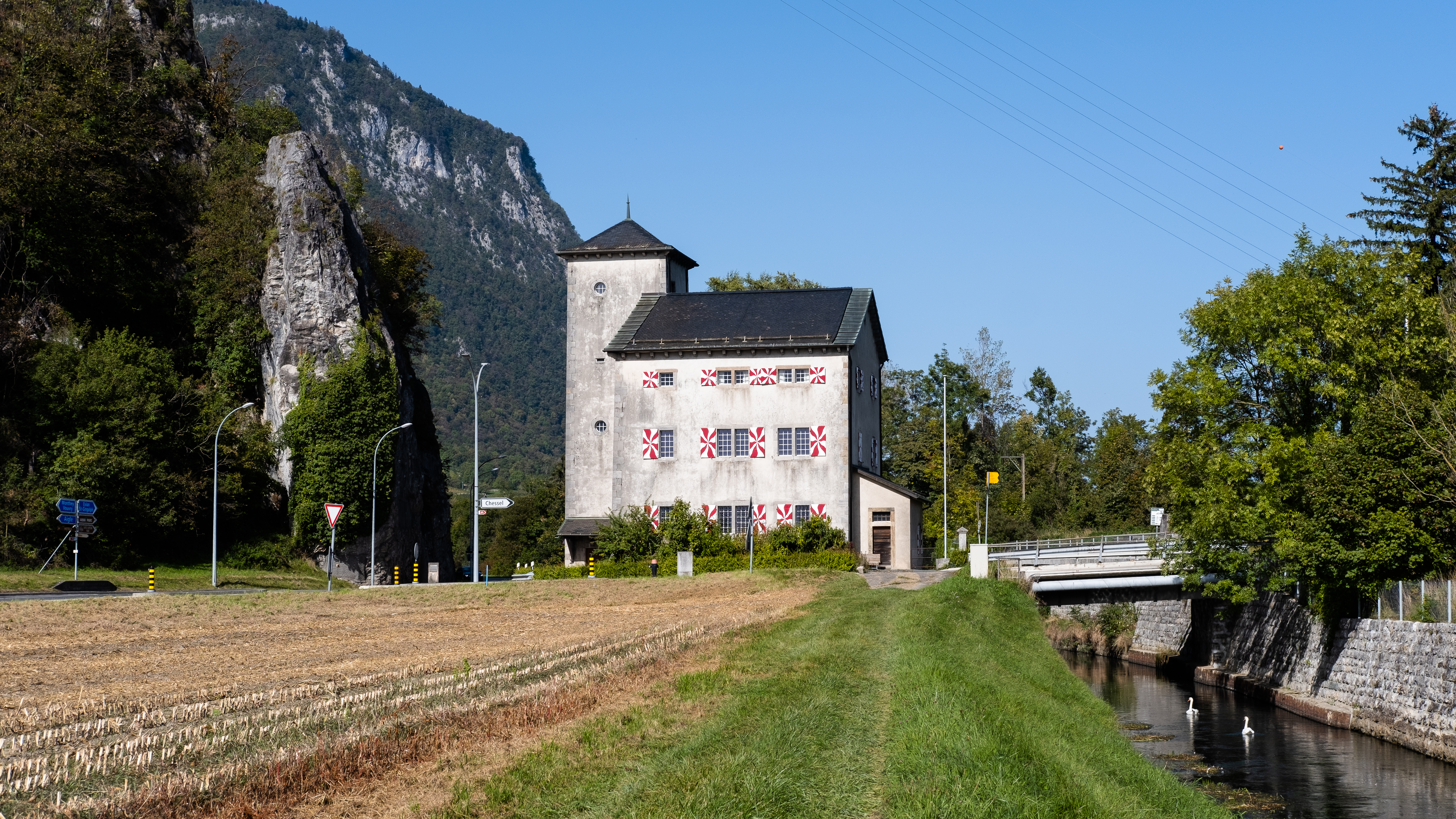
Porte-du-Scex castle

The entire village of Vouvry is designated as part of the Inventory of Swiss Heritage Sites.

== Twin Towns ==
Vouvry is twinned with the towns of Bodnegg, Germany, Sivom du Pays des Maures, France and Cogolin, France.

== Politics ==
In the 2015 federal election the most popular party was the FDP with 39.9% of the vote. The next three most popular parties were the SVP (24.2%), the CVP (19.0%) and the SP (9.6%). In the federal election, a total of 1,108 votes were cast, and the voter turnout was 48.3%.

In the 2009 Conseil d'État/Staatsrat election a total of 780 votes were cast, of which 36 or about 4.6% were invalid. The voter participation was 38.6%, which is much less than the cantonal average of 54.67%. In the 2007 Swiss Council of States election a total of 954 votes were cast, of which 77 or about 8.1% were invalid. The voter participation was 48.9%, which is much less than the cantonal average of 59.88%.

In the 2007 federal election the most popular party was the FDP which received 33.29% of the vote. The next three most popular parties were the CVP (24.61%), the SVP (22.97%) and the SP (10.83%). In the federal election, a total of 1,001 votes were cast, and the voter turnout was 49.7%.

== Economy ==
Vouvry is an industrial-tertiary municipality, in other words, a municipality where agriculture and manufacturing play a minor role in the economy. As of 2014, there were a total of 1,541 people employed in the municipality. Of these, a total of 49 people worked in 17 businesses in the primary economic sector. The secondary sector employed 772 workers in 66 separate businesses. There were 11 small businesses with a total of 285 employees and 3 mid sized businesses with a total of 345 employees. Finally, the tertiary sector provided 720 jobs in 154 businesses. There were 9 small businesses with a total of 225 employees and one mid sized business with 141 employees. In 2014 a total of 10.3% of the population received social assistance.

In 2015 local hotels had a total of 7,203 overnight stays, of which 37.6% were international visitors.

In 2008 the total number of full-time equivalent jobs was 1,085. The number of jobs in the primary sector was 37, all of which were in agriculture. The number of jobs in the secondary sector was 618 of which 431 or (69.7%) were in manufacturing and 179 (29.0%) were in construction. The number of jobs in the tertiary sector was 430. In the tertiary sector; 78 or 18.1% were in wholesale or retail sales or the repair of motor vehicles, 37 or 8.6% were in the movement and storage of goods, 56 or 13.0% were in a hotel or restaurant, 5 or 1.2% were in the information industry, 15 or 3.5% were the insurance or financial industry, 7 or 1.6% were technical professionals or scientists, 54 or 12.6% were in education and 129 or 30.0% were in health care.

In 2000, there were 709 workers who commuted into the municipality and 809 workers who commuted away. The municipality is a net exporter of workers, with about 1.1 workers leaving the municipality for every one entering. About 11.3% of the workforce coming into Vouvry are coming from outside Switzerland. Of the working population, 7% used public transportation to get to work, and 66.2% used a private car.

== Religion ==
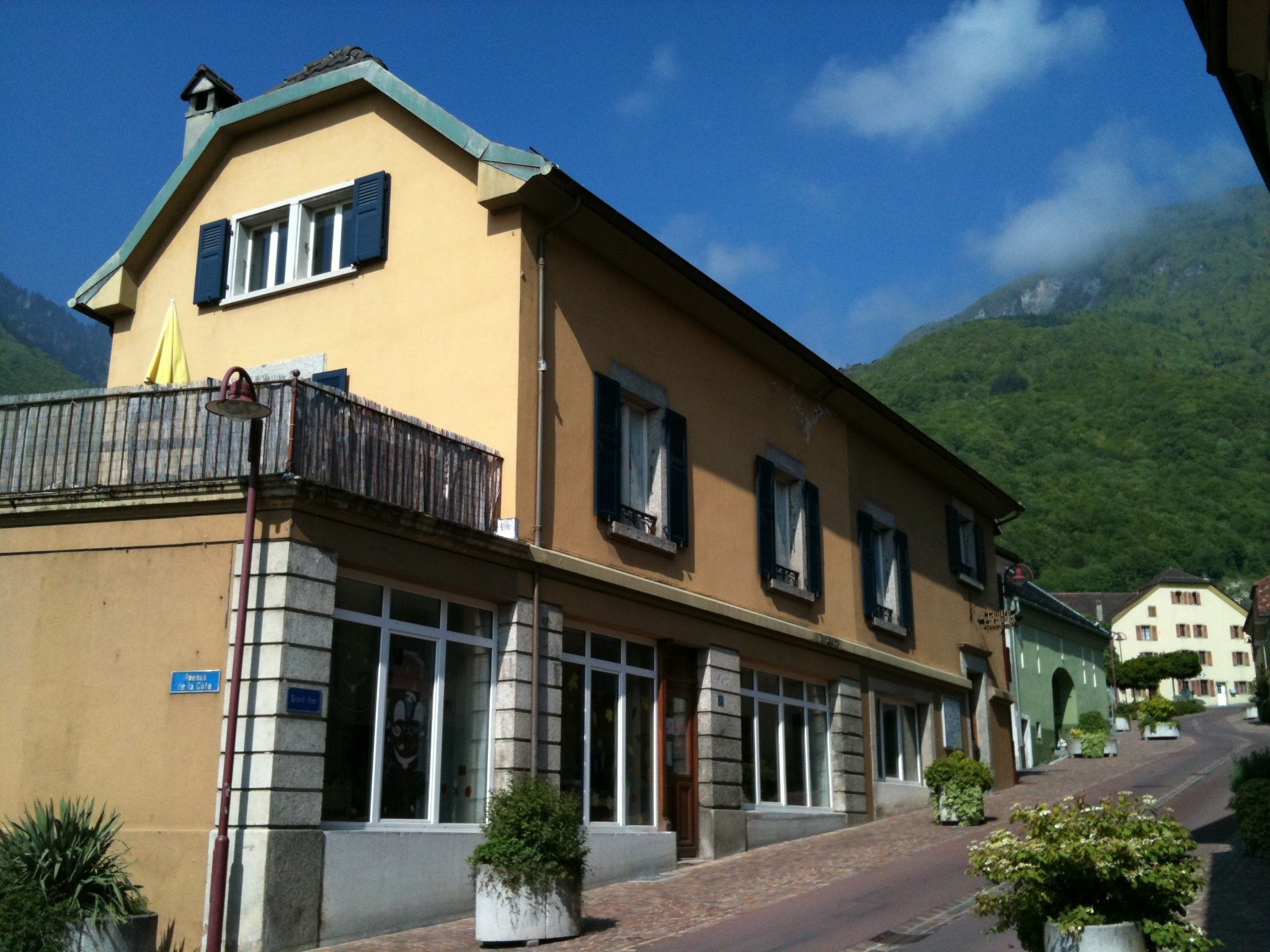
Reformed Church meeting hall of Vourvy

From the 2000 census, 1,828 or 61.8% were Roman Catholic, while 514 or 17.4% belonged to the Swiss Reformed Church. Of the rest of the population, there were 31 members of an Orthodox church (or about 1.05% of the population), there was 1 individual who belongs to the Christian Catholic Church, and there were 39 individuals (or about 1.32% of the population) who belonged to another Christian church. There were 267 (or about 9.02% of the population) who were Islamic. There were 5 individuals who were Buddhist, 6 individuals who were Hindu and 2 individuals who belonged to another church. 167 (or about 5.64% of the population) belonged to no church, are agnostic or atheist, and 119 individuals (or about 4.02% of the population) did not answer the question.

== Education ==
In Vouvry about 999 or (33.8%) of the population have completed non-mandatory upper secondary education, and 221 or (7.5%) have completed additional higher education (either university or a Fachhochschule). Of the 221 who completed tertiary schooling, 58.4% were Swiss men, 24.4% were Swiss women, 10.4% were non-Swiss men and 6.8% were non-Swiss women.

As of 2000, there were 170 students in Vouvry who came from another municipality, while 91 residents attended schools outside the municipality.

Vouvry is home to the Bibliothèque municipale et scolaire library. The library has (as of 2008) 17,000 books or other media, and loaned out 12,809 items in the same year. It was open a total of 280 days with average of 14.5 hours per week during that year.

== Crime ==
In 2014 the crime rate, of the over 200 crimes listed in the Swiss Criminal Code (running from murder, robbery and assault to accepting bribes and election fraud), in Vouvry was 34.4 per thousand residents, which is 53.3% of the average rate in the entire country. During the same period, the rate of drug crimes was 11.8 per thousand residents, or about the same as the national rate.

== Points of interest ==
- Chavalon Thermal Power Plant
- Thermal power plant of Vouvry
