= Collombey-Muraz =

- Municipality
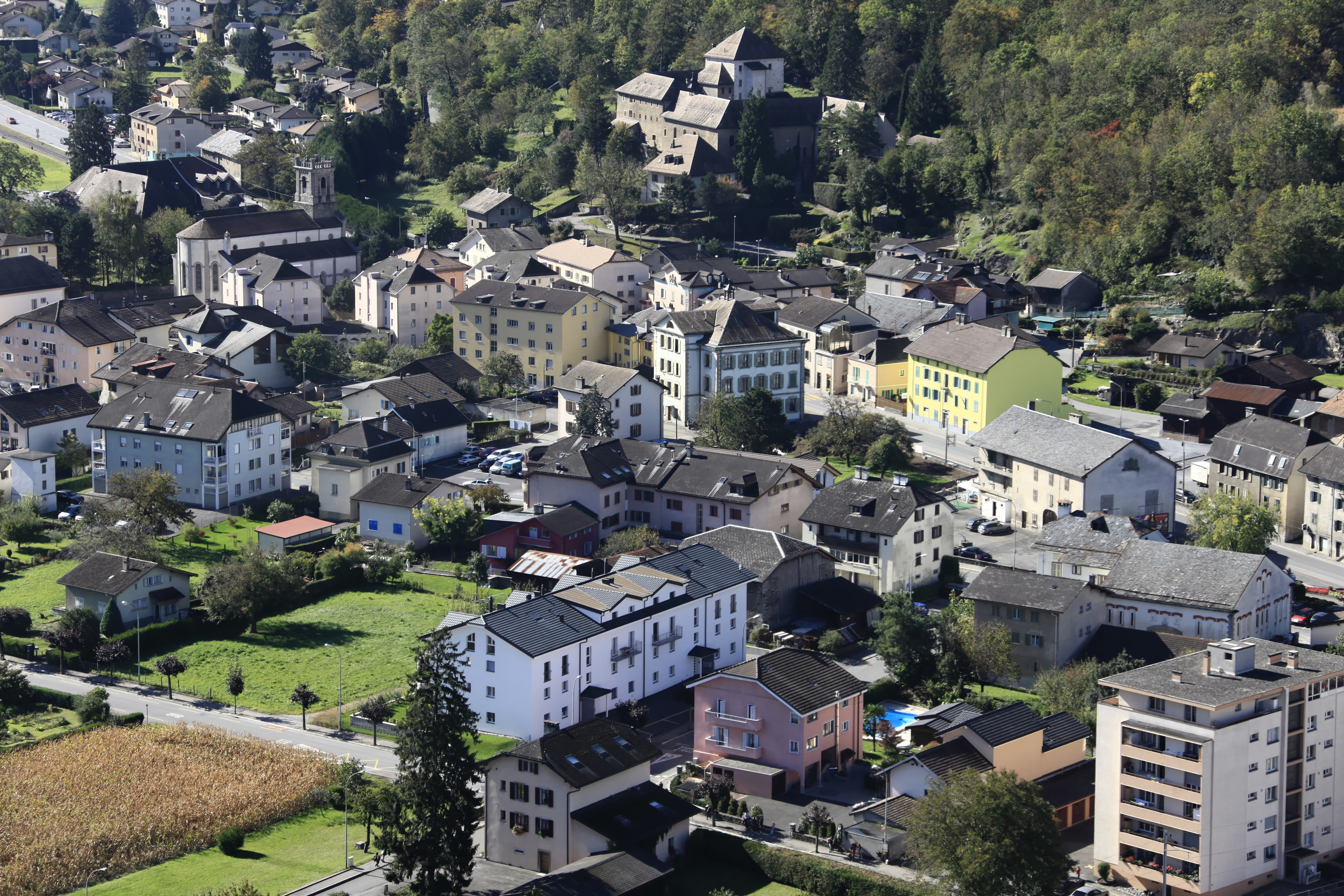
- Aerial view of central Collombey

- Flag Coat of arms
- Location of Collombey-Muraz
- Location within Switzerland Location within Canton of Valais
- Coordinates: 46°16′N 6°57′E
- Country: Switzerland
- Canton: Valais
- District: Monthey

Government
  - Mayor: Président; Olivier Turin SPS/PSS

Area
  - Total: 29.8 km^{2} (11.5 sq mi)
- Elevation: 392 m (1,286 ft)

Population (December 2002)
  - Total: 5,856
  - Density: 197/km^{2} (509/sq mi)
- Time zone: UTC+01:00 (CET)
  - Summer (DST): UTC+02:00 (CEST)
- Postal code: 1868
- SFOS number: 6152
- ISO 3166 code: CH-VS
- Surrounded by: Aigle (VD), Châtel (FR-74), Monthey, Ollon (VD), Troistorrents, Vionnaz, Vouvry
- Website: www.collombey-muraz.ch

Collombey-Muraz is a municipality in the district of Monthey in the canton of Valais in Switzerland.

== Geography ==
After the town of Saint-Maurice, the Rhône river flows north towards Lake Geneva. The plain widens on both sides of it, with an area called the Chablais valaisan on its left bank. The district of Monthey is part of it with its nine municipalities, one of which is Collombey-Muraz.

Collombey-Muraz includes the villages of Collombey, Muraz, Collombey-le-Grand, Illarsaz, and Les Neyres. Due to its high proportion of flat ground, it is one of the largest municipalities in the Valais, extending over 29.81 km2.

A survey in 2013-2018 established that housing and infrastructure represented 14.1% of its territory, agricultural areas 36.5%, wooded areas 40.0%, and unproductive areas 9.3%.

Seven alpine pastures, Chalet-Neuf, Conches, Chemeneau, Grand-Crau, Dreveneuse d’en Bas, Chermeux and Onnaz, extend over the heights bordering France. They are owned by the bourgeoisie, who rent them to farmers for the summer season.

The highest point of the municipality, La Pointe de Bellevue at 2,042 metres, offers a view stretching from Lake Geneva to the Dents du Midi. Since 2013, it has given its name to a popular foot race.

=== The villages ===
==== Collombey ====
Collombey is the largest of the municipality's five villages, with nearly 4,600 inhabitants at the end of 2016. It has experienced unprecedented growth since the 1990s with the construction of shopping centers and many residential buildings.

==== Muraz ====
On a hillside, Muraz has long suffered from the whims of the two streams bordering it, which have destroyed crops and flooded homes. The village extends on either side of the cantonal road, between a mountain flank and the plain. Like other localities, Muraz has grown considerably and presently has some 2,700 inhabitants.

==== Collombey-le-Grand ====
If the "grand" in Collombey-le-Grand ever indicated that the village was bigger or grander than neighbouring Collombey, then that was only true before the 12th century (according to Maurice Parvex, Collombey-Muraz). Today the village still deserves this qualifier if it includes the vast industrial area bordering it. With some 500 inhabitants, the village was originally huddled around the Chapel of Our Lady of the Seven Joys (chapelle Notre Dame des Sept-Joies) before experiencing considerable growth and extending into the plain.

==== Illarsaz ====
Illarsaz is a quintessential valley floor village, on the road connecting Vionnaz to Aigle. It was once surrounded by marshes, which have now given way to agriculture. The locality consists mainly of individual villas for a population of about 700 inhabitants.

==== Les Neyres ====
On a hillside, nestled between Monthey and Troistorrents, Les Neyres is the fifth and smallest village of the municipality. You have to take the Val d’Illiez road (route du Val d'Illiez) to discover Les Neyres, a scattered habitat of some 400 inhabitants. Like the other villages, Les Neyres has experienced strong growth in recent years, even prompting the municipality to reopen an infant school.

== Transport ==
The village of Collombey is served by two railway lines: the CFF Tonkin line (Saint-Maurice – Saint-Gingolph) and the AOMC regional train (Aigle – Ollon – Monthey - Champéry). In addition, a city bus travels hourly to Monthey. The five villages of the municipality are also connected to the surrounding localities by a bus service run by the Public Transport of Chablais (TPC).

== Toponymy ==
Collombey derives from the Latin noun cŏlumbārium, which refers either to a dovecote, or to a tomb or to a burial vault. It is not possible to know which applies, even though the municipality’s coat of arms includes doves.

Muraz derives from the Latin noun murum (plural: mura). It refers to a place consisting of remains of walls and constructions. The final z is silent, indicating that the accent is on the u and that the a is atonic.

In Valaisan patois, Collombey is pronounced Collambâ.

== History ==
The geographical and political configuration as an autonomous municipality dates back to the division of the castellany of Monthey in 1787.

Geological evolution has left erratic blocks such as the Pierre à Dzo (300 m³), the Pierre à Muguet (1,000 m³), and the Bloc Studer (500 m³). The archaeological site of Châble-Croix, dating back to between 6880 and 6330 BC, could be the oldest in the Valais. From 1900 the exploitation of granite from the ancient glacial moraine uncovered Neolithic necropolises on the heights of Barmaz, dating back to the Neolithic age, around 3000 to 1800 BC.

Historic aerial photograph by Werner Friedli from 1949

The history of Collombey-Muraz was essentially agricultural until the 1960s.

=== Key historical events in Collombey-Muraz ===
1216: Start of the construction of the Arbignon castle by the family of the same name, which will become the Monastery of the Bernardines.

1283: First mention of the parish of Muraz, after its separation from that of Collombey. Ancient foundations under the current church.

1630: Construction of the Châtillon castle, which will become the Manor of Fay de Lavallaz and whose first foundations date from the beginning of the 14th century.

1643: Reconstruction by the Bernardines of the Arbignon castle with a view to setting up their monastery.

1647: Foundation of the Monastery of the Bernardines.

1723: Official separation of Collombey and Monthey. Collombey becomes a parish again following the consecration of the old church in 1723.

1787: Division of the castellany of Monthey. On September 22, 1787, Governor Jean-Joseph Jost invites representatives of Troistorrents, Collombey, and Muraz to appear before him on October 2, 1787, on the subject of the division of communal property.

1798: Population census: Collombey 209 inhabitants, Collombey-le-Grand 70, Muraz 202, Illarsaz 53, Les Neyres 57.

1811: Fire in the church of Collombey.

1826: Construction of the Collombey presbytery.

1847: Closure of the gates of the bridge over the Rhône between Collombey and Saint-Triphon and establishment of permanently guarded fortifications along the Rhône

1855: Reconstruction of the chapel of Collombey-le-Grand dedicated to Our Lady of the Seven Joys.

1859: Crossing of the municipal territory by the first locomotive of the Tonkin line.

1873: Inauguration of the new church in Collombey.

1876: Foundation of the music society “La Collombeyrienne”.

1881: Charles de Lavallaz founds a tobacco and cigar factory in Monthey.

1894: Construction of the Illarsaz bridge by G. Schmiedt of Geneva.

1897: Foundation in Muraz of the music society “La Villageoise”.

1898: Inauguration of the new church in Muraz (bell tower from 1657) and of the town hall in Collombey.

1906: Construction of the bridge over the Rhône between Collombey and Saint-Triphon. Length 72 m, weight 170.3 tons.

1907: Opening of the Aigle-Ollon-Monthey train line.

1909: Foundation in Collombey of the music society “L’Avenir”.

1941: Establishment of a camp for Polish internees in Illarsaz, Russians and Germans will also be interned later.

1946: Electrification of the Tonkin line from Saint-Maurice to Collombey.

1960: Opening of Switzerland's first oil refinery.

1970-1971: Construction of a school complex on the “Route de Collombey-le-Grand”.

1976: Construction of the bridge over the CFF track in Vionnaz (entirely on Collombey-Muraz territory), as well as the bridge over the Rhône leading to the highway.

1976: Inauguration of SATOM.

1981: Visit of Mr. Kurt Fürgler, President of the Confederation, to the Convent of the Bernardines in Collombey.

1986: Construction of a new bridge over the Rhône between Collombey and Saint-Triphon, downstream from the previous one.

1988: Celebration of the bicentenary of the municipality of Collombey-Muraz.

2015: Closure of the Tamoil oil refinery.

2022: A local referendum turns down a proposal to merge Collombey-Muraz with Monthey.

== Demonyms and nicknames ==
The inhabitants of Collombey are called Collombeyrouds or Collomberous. They are nicknamed lou Bérou, which means rams in Valaisan patois.

The inhabitants of Muraz are called Muriands. They are nicknamed Fascines, in reference to the making of twig bundles to be used as firewood.

== Demographics ==
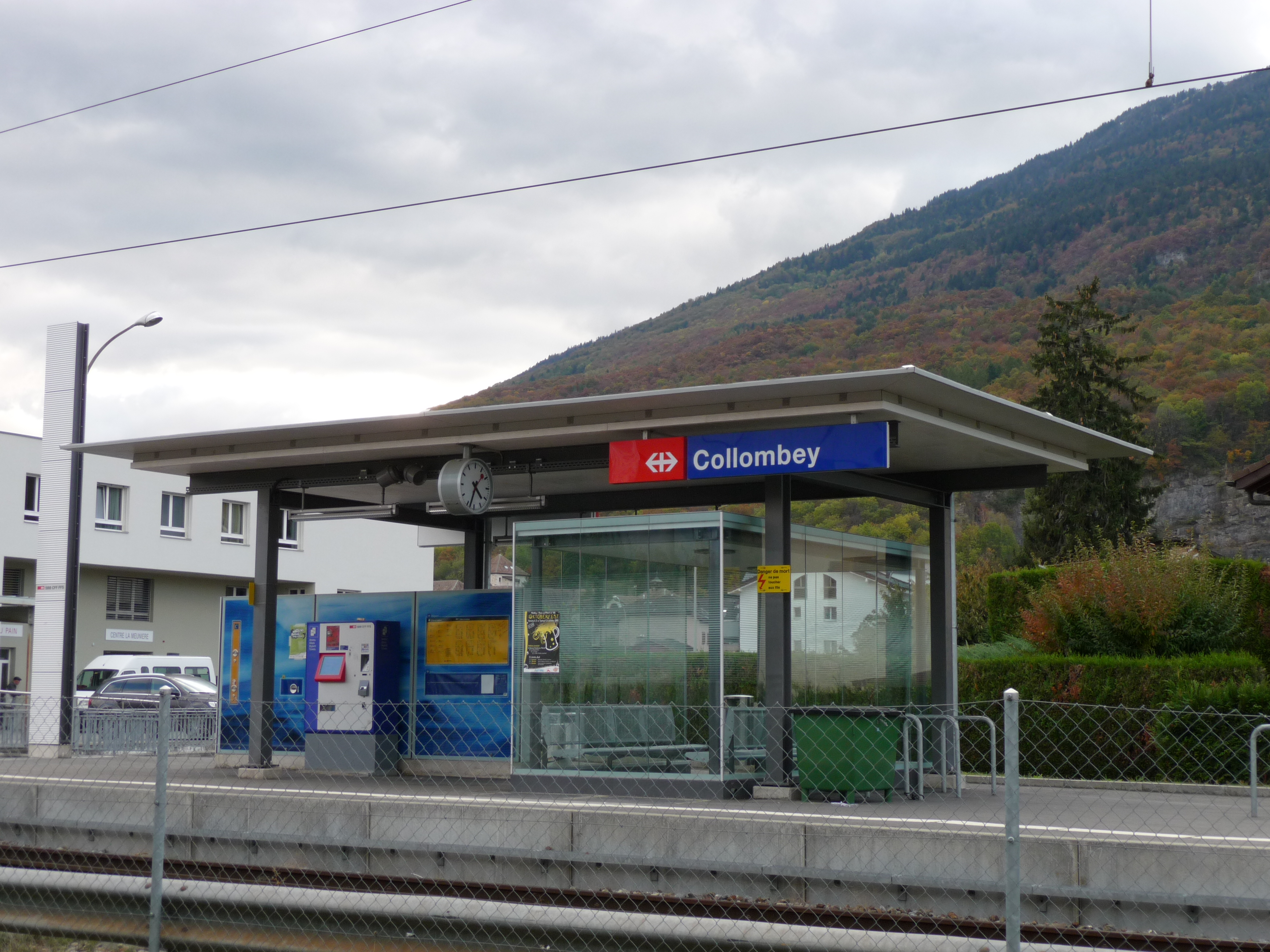
Collombey rail station

=== Trends ===
In early 2023 Collombey-Muraz had a population of 9,739, with a density of 327 inhabitants per square kilometre. Between 2010 and 2019, its population increased by 30.1% (canton: 10.5%; Switzerland: 9.4%).

=== Age spread ===
In 2020, the proportion of people under 30 in Collombey-Muraz was 37.4%, which was above the cantonal level (31.7%). The proportion of people over 60 was 18.5%, compared to the cantonal level (26.6%).

In the same year, 4,767 men and 4,831 women made up the municipality's population, resulting in a male rate of 48.9%, which was higher than the cantonal rate of 48.4%.

== Education ==
Collombey-Muraz provides kindergarten, primary schools and a secondary school ("cycle d'orientation" on the Perraires site) for the children of the municipality. Responding to local demographic expansion, a new school opened in the village of Muraz at the start of the 2014 school year.

== Sports ==
=== Football ===
The Union Sportive Collombey-Muraz (USCM) was founded in 1970, born of the merger of FC Collombey and FC Muraz. The club has about 220 members spread over fourteen teams, including two in "active" leagues (2nd regional and 3rd league), one at senior level and eleven at junior level. The USCM also runs a football school that brings together 20 to 25 children per season.

=== Basketball ===
The BBC Collombey-Muraz was created in 1982. It has an average of 100 members. The 1st team has been present in the Swiss 1st league championship since 1992, without interruption. The club works closely with the BBC Monthey as part of a partnership signed between the two clubs under the aegis of the National Basketball League. The club also offers the possibility for adults, young and old, to play basketball in the 2nd cantonal league. Finally, the many youth teams (M19, M16, M14, M12, M10, and M8) crisscross Switzerland as they compete in cantonal, Romand (COBB), and Swiss championships.

=== Judo ===
Collombey-Muraz's judo school (EJCM) was founded in November 1977. In 25 years of existence, its members have won more than 200 cantonal and Swiss titles. With a hundred members, the EJCM has many black belts.

=== Table tennis ===
The Collombey-Muraz table tennis club (CTTCM) was founded in June 1974. It plays as part of the “AVVF” table tennis association, which brings together clubs from the cantons of Vaud, Valais, and Fribourg. The club started with fewer than a dozen members. The 1st team competes in the national league “C” and the 2nd team in the 1st league. The four other teams, with members young and less so, compete in the 3rd, 4th, and 5th leagues. The committee takes special care of the table tennis school (from 8 years old).

=== Running ===
The “Trail de Bellevue”, whose 1st edition took place on June 29, 2013, organises two races, one of 10 km and the other of 32, as well as a children’s race.

=== Archery club ===
The Arc-Club Collombey-Muraz, founded in 1973, brings together archers from all over the Chablais (Valais and Vaud). It is active in competitive sport (both target and forest shooting) and leisure. Many members have already distinguished themselves at the national level, and even at the European level for some. It is open to Olympic bows (classic), compound bows, barebows, as well as more traditional bows (bowhunters and longbows).

=== Wrestling club (Swiss and Greco-Roman) ===
The Illarsaz-Haut-Lac wrestling club celebrated its 70th anniversary in 2012. Founded in 1942 by a group of wrestlers from the region, initial training sessions took place outdoors. A core group of about ten people developed. At any given time, the club trains more than 30 young people from the age of five. It has achieved results in both Swiss wrestling and in freestyle wrestling, including medals at the Swiss freestyle and Greco-Roman wrestling championships, as well as participations in international championships. Its wrestlers have also competed in Swiss wrestling, with a federal crown won by Alain Bifrare in 1986, in Sion. For several years, the club has organised competitions within the municipality. In 2009, the Swiss freestyle wrestling championship took place there, with Florian Vieux finishing 3rd. In 2011, Collombey-Muraz hosted the Romand championship. During the summer of 2012, the Valaisan Cantonal Swiss Wrestling Festival took place at the Perraires, where Sylvain Vieux was victorious.

=== Ski Club ===
On December 11, 1968, a team of friends gathered to found the SC Bellevue of Collombey-Muraz. Since then, the SC has organised ski outings, track and hiking every winter. Since 1979, members have been meeting at the Chalet de Conches, an old alpine chalet, rented to the SC by the Bourgeoisie of Collombey-Muraz. The flagship event remains the traditional popular competition, open to all members of the SC as well as to all people living on the territory of the municipality. It includes a giant slalom (course: Culet customs - Chalet Neuf) and a sealskin race (course: Chalet-Neuf - Bellevue peak).

=== Tennis Club ===
The Tennis-Club Collombey-Muraz, founded in 1984, is one of the largest sports societies in the municipality. Five interclub teams, including two male (active and young seniors) in the 2nd League, two male (young seniors) in the 3rd League and one female (young senior ladies) in the 1st League, make up the competing groups. The club has more than a hundred Swisstennis licensees. Every year, the club organises a Grand Open tournament overseen by Swisstennis in August.

=== Shooting ===
Founded in 2008, the “Sport Shooting Châble-Croix” society was born of the merger of the shooting societies “Les Carabiniers de Collombey-Muraz”, “L’Avenir de Vionnaz” and the “Petit Calibre de Châble-Croix”. In 2014, the society became Swiss champion of the section competition in the LNB ordnance weapons category and several of its representatives stand out both at cantonal and national levels.

== Politics ==
The Municipal Council is the executive authority of the municipality of Collombey-Muraz. On January 1, 2013, the number of councilors was reduced from 9 to 7. Each councilor leads a department that operates by committee (composed of citizens of Collombey-Muraz) and/or by delegation (composed of municipal councilors). These committees or delegations are chaired by the councilor in charge of the department concerned.

The municipality of Collombey-Muraz also has, since January 1, 2013, a General Council, which is the legislative authority and whose 45 representatives were elected for the first time on November 11, 2012.

Presidents since 1912 (in the Valais, a mayor is referred to as a president)

2021-2024 Olivier Turin

2013–2020 Yannick Buttet (2 terms)

2006-2012 Josiane Granger (1.5 terms)

2001-2006 Laurent Métrailler (1.5 terms)

1985-2000 Antoine Lattion (4 terms)

1977-1984 Arthur Zimmermann

1967-1977 Jacques Berrut (2.5 terms)

1956-1967 Sylvain Chervaz (3 terms)

1933-1955 Bernard De Lavallaz (6 terms)

1921-1932 Maurice Parvex (3 terms)

1916-1919 Hubert Riondet

1912-1915 Hubert Burdevet

== Economy ==
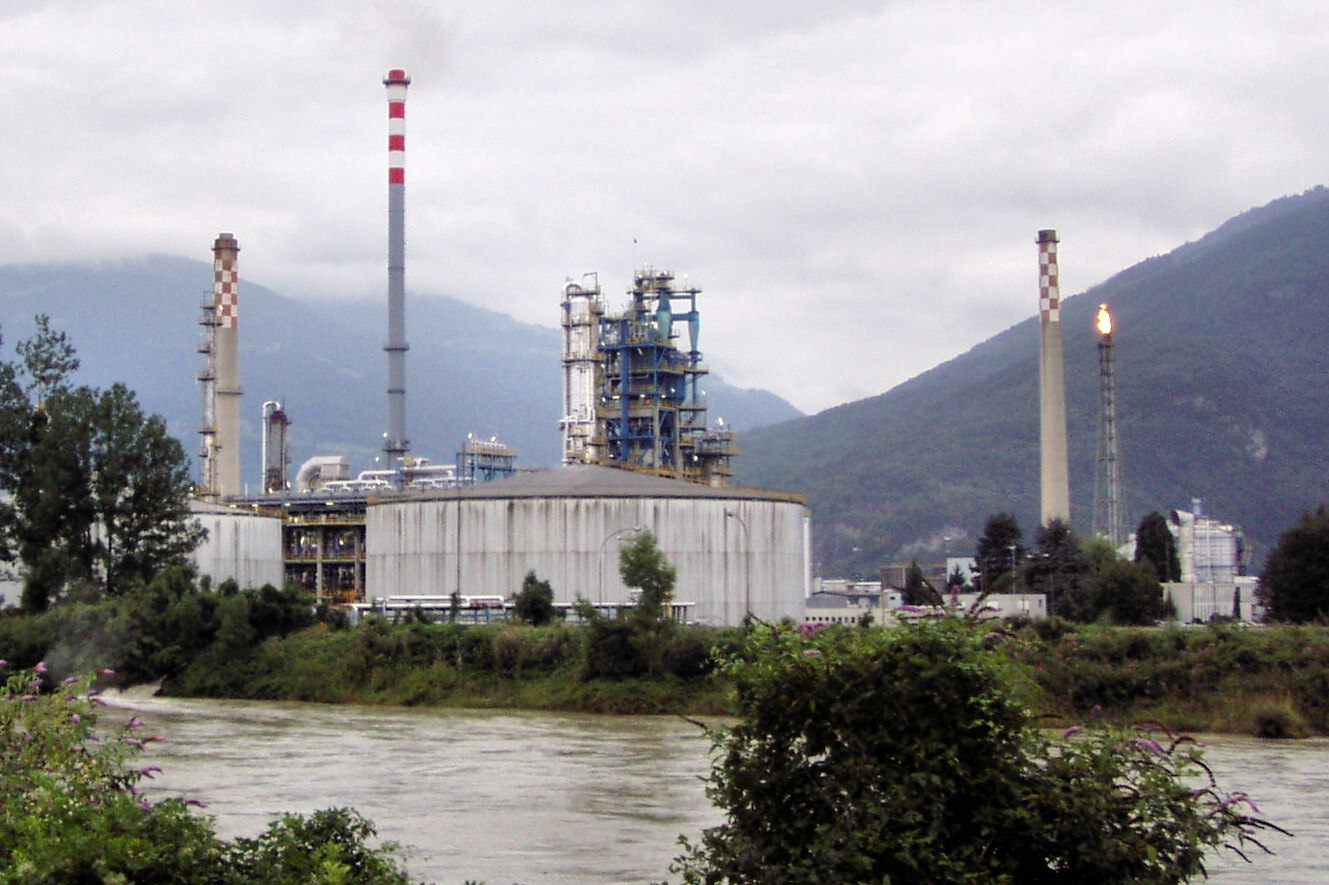
Tamoil's oil refinery in Collombey

=== Agriculture and environment ===
Significant public works carried out during the Second World War enabled the intensification of crops and the modernization of equipment in the plain of the Rhône river. A monument by the Collombey-le-Grand - Illarsaz road commemorates these efforts (Collombey-Muraz, Maurice Parvex).

Environmental protection and careful town and country planning are constant concerns and the first development plan with its specific regulations dates from 1964. To this day, environment-minded projects are constantly being implemented. The main wastewater recovery network with related treatment plants have been operational since 1978.

=== Industry ===
The opening of Switzerland's first oil refinery in 1960, supplied by a pipeline from Genoa, Italy, triggered a significant industrial boom. Constant efforts to attract industry and crafts have led to the development of industrial zones, mainly in Collombey and Collombey-le-Grand. Over the past 30 years, many companies have chosen Collombey-Muraz to house their headquarters.

In 2015, the refinery’s activities ceased, leaving some 250 people unemployed.

== Culture and heritage ==
=== Buildings ===
==== Collombey ====
The Parish Church of Saint-Didier (Eglise paroissiale Saint-Didier). This church replaces an older building, built in 1616 by Bishop Hildebrand Jost and transformed in 1723. The current church was erected in 1873 by the architect Émile Vuilloud and transformed in 1949 by enlarging the choir bays. Restoration 1962-1963. This neo-Romanesque style building, with three naves and a semi-circular apse choir, has a bell tower-porch characterized crowned by four corner turrets. Inside are baptismal fonts from around 1700 and mosaics and stained glass windows by Paul Monnier, 1965.

Detailed article (in French): Monastery of Collombey.

The Manor of Châtillon-Larringes (Manoir de Châtillon-Larringes), located below the monastery, was rebuilt in 1653 after a fire. It was established on the site of the old tower of the nobles of Collombey, which had been passed on in the 14th century to Guillaume de Châtillon-Larringes, and which has been in the hands of the Du Fay de Lavallaz family since the beginning of the 17th century. The carriage door, in a full arch, goes back to 1633 and gives access to a service courtyard. Also present is a dwelling with a two-level portico and front body topped with a triangular gable, adorned with the painted Du Fey de Lavallaz coat of arms.

==== Collombey-le-Grand ====
The Chapel of the Seven Joys of the Virgin (La chapelle des Sept-Joies-de-la-Vierge), completed in1855, contains a baroque altarpiece with a central painting from 1858, by Emmanuel Chapelet, illustrating the Virgin.

==== Muraz ====
The Parish Church of Saint-André (Église paroissiale Saint-André) replaced an older building, according to 13th-century records. It was rebuilt in 1615–1623 under the aegis of Bishop Hildebrand Jost. The original bell tower survives, with an octagonal spire pierced with dormer windows, reused as a bell tower-porch. The current church, in neo-Gothic style with a single nave, a polygonal choir and a ribbed vault, was built in 1898 by Joseph de Kalbermatten. It was restored between 1972 and 1974, and again in 2019. Inside, a neo-Gothic main altar with statues of saints Guillaume, Urbain, Thérèse and Rosalie frames the tabernacle.

The Chapel of Our Lady of the Snows (Chapelle Notre-Dame des Neiges) is a rectangular 18th-century building.

==== Illarsaz ====
The Chapel of Saint-Bernard-de-Montjoux (Chapelle Saint-Bernard-de-Montjoux) dates from 1965, when it replaced an 18th-century sanctuary. It is a concrete building with a detached bell tower. Inside, the baroque altar was taken from the old chapel and dates from the beginning of the 18th century. It displays the arms of Riedmatten and Stockalper. Mosaics and stained glass windows by Jean-Claude Morend.

==== Wells ====
The high water table encouraged Collombey, Collombey-le-Grand and Illarsaz to dig many wells and thus ensure an adequate water supply to the inhabitants and livestock. Records such as the Cahier de l’Association du Vieux Collombey-Muraz even suggest that whenever a family decided to build a house, the first step was to dig a well. There were 62 of them, many of which still exist today for ornamental purposes. The municipality has recognized this particular treasure by dedicating a street and even a square to it: the Rue des Puits and the Place des Puits.

==== The Bakery ====
The demolition in 2000 of a house in Collombey-Le-Grand revealed the existence of a village bread oven. This discovery triggered the idea of rebuilding a communal oven in order to, on the one hand, preserve and enhance its recoverable elements and, on the other, carry out a project of general interest. An association was created for this purpose and the inauguration of the new construction was held on September 21, 2002.

Since then, four related events now take place four times a year:

- Palm Sunday weekend

- Bread festival on the Saturday of the Federal Fast

- Patronal feast in November

- Advent window.

=== Music, theater and sociocultural activities ===
Located near Monthey, whose cultural life is rich and varied, the municipality has its own music societies - Les Colombes and the Villageoise de Muraz - and a choir (Choeur Mixte).

An amateur theatre troupe, Théâtre du Rovra, has been offering a show to the local public every year since 1946.

Sociocultural infrastructure has been developed: a school and sports center with multipurpose rooms, a swimming pool, a children’s daycare centre, primary schools, an "orientation cycle", a municipal library, three football fields, tennis courts, a network of pedestrian paths and hiking trails, playgrounds, a covered area of 200 seats for societies and families. In terms of sports and cultural, 23 local societies enable some 2400 people to indulge in their favorite pastime.

== Notable people ==
- The Châtillon du Chablais family, lord of the area and valley (13th – 17th centuries).
- Gilbert Constantin, painter and sculptor (1947–2010).
- Alexis Gex-Fabry, mountain runner and member of the municipal council.

== Coat of arms ==
=== Blazon ===
The coat of arms of Collombey-Muraz combines doves, which represent Collombey, and a wall representing Muraz. Several variations have been recorded: with a dungeon and surrounding wall, with a tower instead of a dungeon, or with a solid wall with two of the three doves perched on it.

== Notes and references ==
Please refer to the French site > Official website
