= Compagnie Générale de Navigation sur le lac Léman =

Swiss ferry company

Compagnie générale de navigation sur le Lac Léman
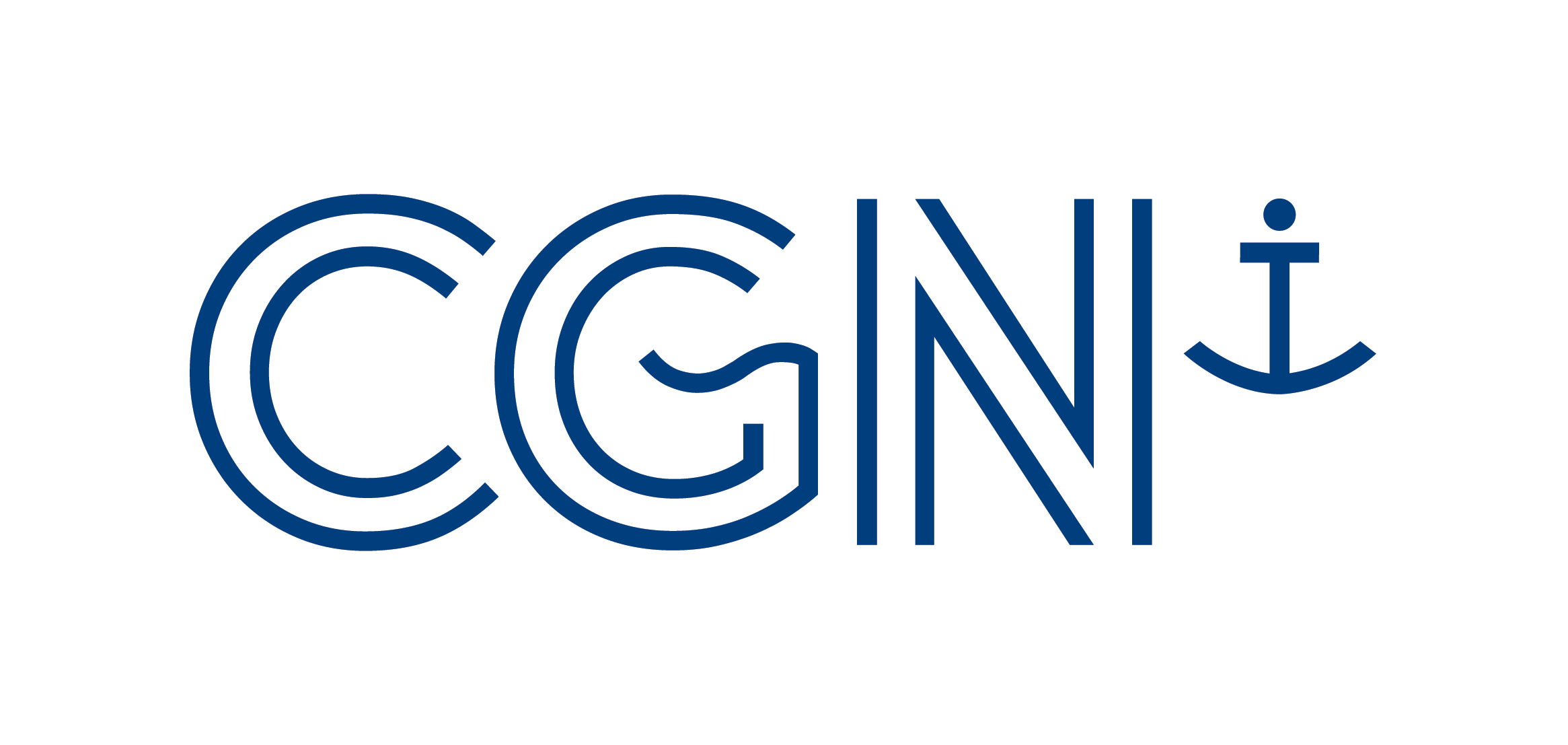

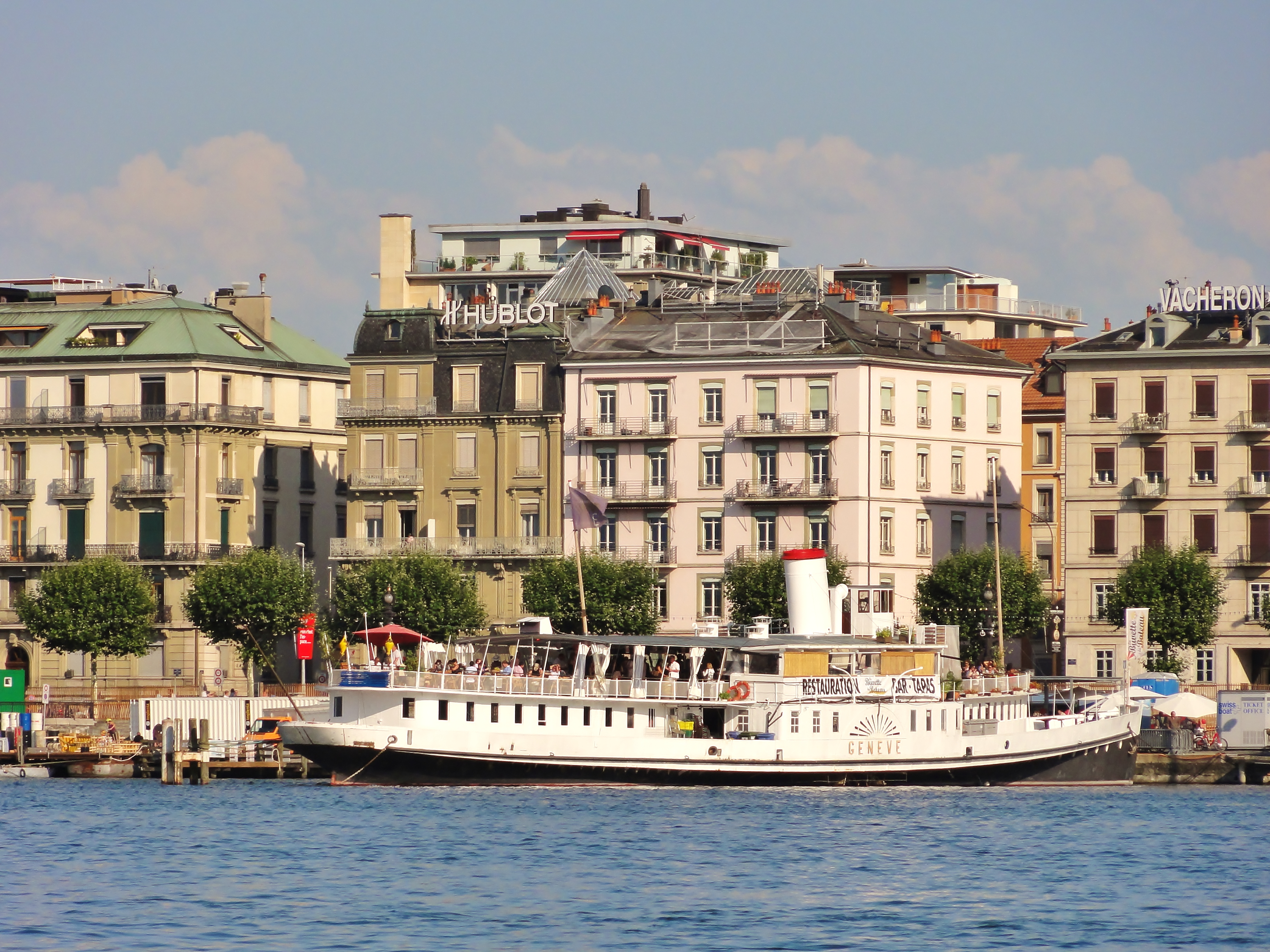
- The Genève launched in 1896 for the national exhibition in the city
- Type: S.A.
- Industry: Transport
- Founded: 1873; 153 years ago
- Headquarters: Lausanne, Switzerland
- Area served: Lake Geneva
- Website: www.cgn.ch/fr/

The Compagnie générale de navigation sur le Lac Léman or Lake Geneva General Navigation Company (commonly abbreviated to CGN) is a public Swiss company operating ships on Lake Geneva connecting towns in both France and Switzerland including Geneva, Vevey, Montreux, Évian-les-Bains, and Lausanne.

== History ==
The CGN was formed in 1873 through the merger between three companies, bringing together the vessels 'Helvétie', 'Léman', 'Aigle' and later the 'Flèche' in a single fleet. The growth of tourism corresponded with the construction of railways during the second half of the 19th century, leading the CGN to cater for tourists as well as local traffic.

The cessation of tourism during World War I severely affected the CGN. Similarly affected during World War II, the company had to cease all operations for three months during 1940. The company was rescued by state intervention in 1943.

After the war the fleet was updated, with some steamships converted to diesel and from the 1960s augmented with new vessels.

== Current fleets ==
Map of routes on Lake Geneva

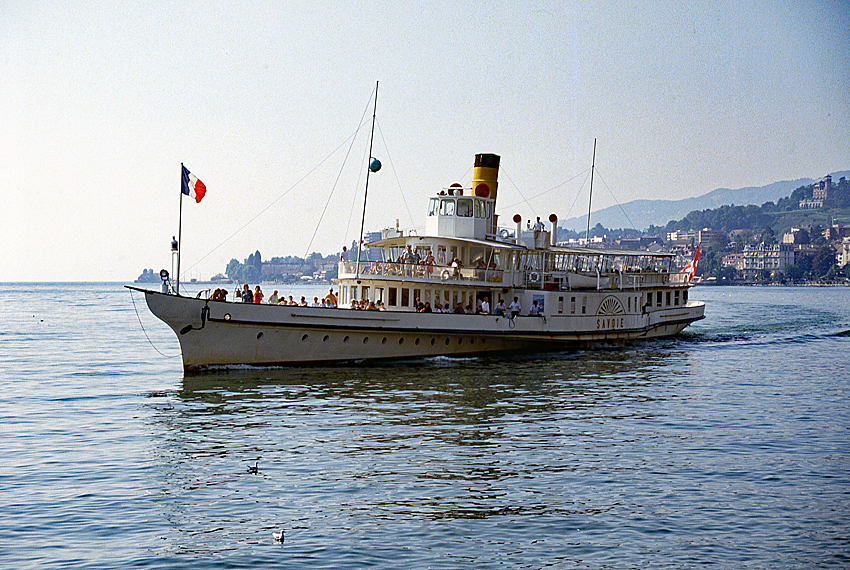
Savoie leaving Montreux

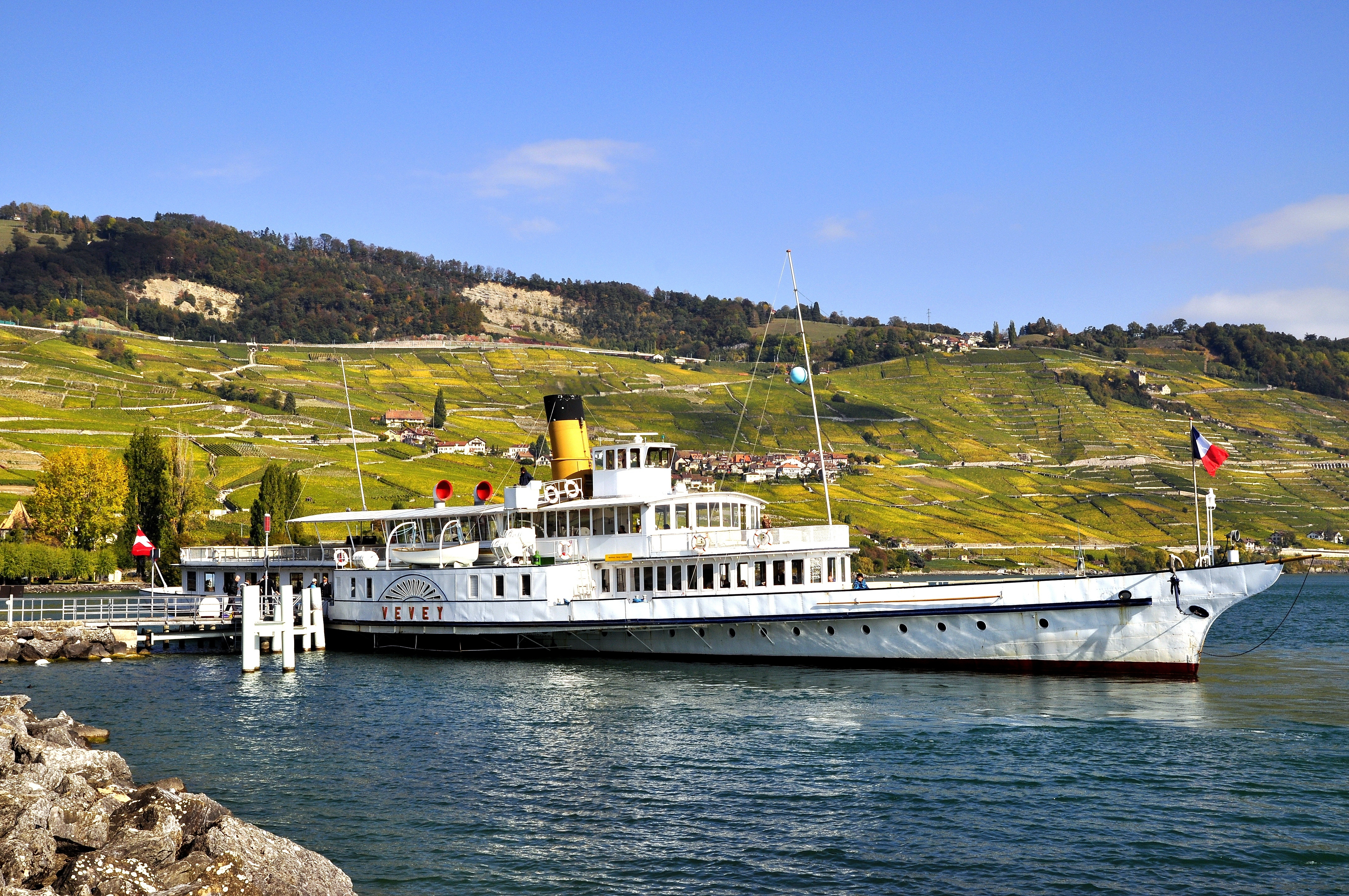
Vevey

As a Swiss registered company, the ships fly the Swiss flag at the stern but, as the southern shore of the lake is mainly French territory, they also fly the Tricolour from the jackstaff at the bow.

Vessel	Type	Year	Length	Power	Passenger capacity
La Suisse	Paddle steamer	1910	78.5 m (258 ft)	1,030 kW (1,380 hp)	1200
Simplon	Paddle steamer	1920	78.5 m (258 ft)	1,030 kW (1,380 hp)	1200
Montreux	Paddle steamer	1904	68.3 m (224 ft)	650 kW (870 hp)	800
Savoie	Paddle steamer	1914	68 m (223 ft)	660 kW (890 hp)	800
Rhône	Paddle steamer	1927	68 m (223 ft)	625 kW (838 hp)	825
Helvétie	Diesel electric paddle wheel	1926	78.5 m (258 ft)		1400
Vevey	Diesel electric paddle wheel	1907	66 m (217 ft)	515 kW (691 hp)	750
Italie	Diesel electric paddle wheel	1908	65.5 m (215 ft)	515 kW (691 hp)	800
Lausanne	Diesel	1991	78.8 m (259 ft)	2 × 870 kW (1,170 hp)	1500
Henry-Dunant	Diesel	1963	50.2 m (165 ft)	2 × 365 kW (489 hp)	700
Général-Guisan	Diesel	1964	50.2 m (165 ft)	2 × 365 kW (489 hp)	700
Chablais	Diesel	1974	46.1 m (151 ft)	2 × 325 kW (436 hp)	560
Ville-de-Genève	Diesel	1978	47.2 m (155 ft)	2 × 400 kW (540 hp)	560
Léman	Diesel	1990	49.6 m (163 ft)	2 × 520 kW (700 hp)	850
Valais	Diesel	2008	30.8 m (101 ft)	2 × 720 kW (970 hp)	200
Morges; Lavaux	Diesel	2006	30.8 m (101 ft)	2 × 720 kW (970 hp)	200
Coppet; Genève	Hydrojet	2007	24.8 m (81 ft)	2 × 1,045 kW (1,401 hp)	120
Col-Vert	Diesel powered	1960	28.3 m (93 ft)	294 kW (394 hp)	130

== See also ==
- Transport in Switzerland
