= List of mountains of Valais =

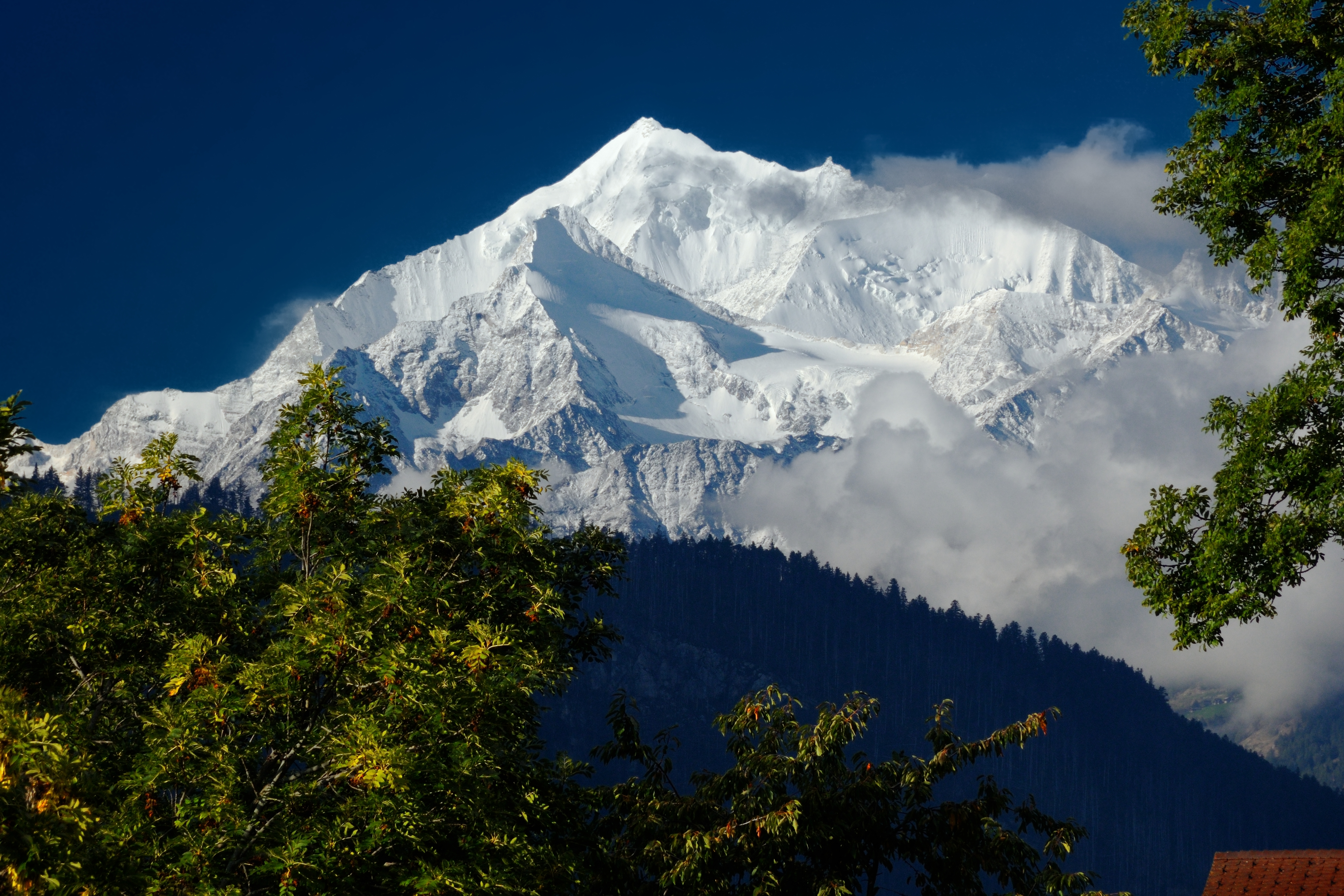
The Weisshorn

This is a list of mountains of the Swiss canton of Valais. Valais is a very mountainous canton and includes the highest mountains of Switzerland. The highest mountain ranges are the Pennine Alps, the Bernese Alps and the Mont Blanc massif. Topographically, the two most important summits of the canton are those of Monte Rosa (most elevated and isolated) and the Finsteraarhorn (most prominent).

This list only includes significant summits with a topographic prominence of at least 150 metres (492 ft). There are 271 such summits in Valais and they are found in all 13 districts. All mountain heights and prominences on the list are from the largest-scale maps available.

Distribution of the mountains with at least 150 metres of prominence
District	-1999m	2000- 2499m	2500- 2999m	3000- 3499m	3500- 3999m	4000m+	Total
Brig	0	1	10	6	6	1	24
Conthey	1	0	6	5	0	0	12
Entremont	1	1	12	10	21	1	46
Goms	0	0	11	19	14	5	49
Hérens	0	0	6	9	15	1	31
Leuk	0	0	6	13	3	0	22
Martigny	1	2	5	3	2	0	13
Monthey	6	10	1	3	0	0	20
Saint-Maurice	0	1	8	5	0	0	14
Raron	0	1	6	10	7	1	25
Sierre	0	0	6	9	4	4	23
Sion	0	0	4	2	0	0	6
Visp	0	0	5	15	13	20	53
Valais	8	15	71	83	67	27	271

== List ==
Rank	Mountain	Height (m)	Drop (m)	Coordinates	Range	District(s)	First ascent
1	Monte Rosa (Dufourspitze)	4634	2165	45°56′13″N 07°52′01″E	Pennine Alps	Visp	1855
2	Dom	4546	1047	46°05′38″N 07°51′32″E	Pennine Alps	Visp	1858
3	Lyskamm	4532	379	45°55′20″N 07°50′08″E	Pennine Alps	Visp	1861
4	Weisshorn	4505	1234	46°06′05″N 07°42′57″E	Pennine Alps	Sierre/Visp	1861
5	Täschhorn	4491	213	46°05′01″N 07°51′26″E	Pennine Alps	Visp	1862
6	Matterhorn	4478	1043	45°58′35″N 07°39′31″E	Pennine Alps	Visp	1865
7	Dent Blanche	4357	916	46°02′03″N 07°36′43″E	Pennine Alps	Hérens/Sierre/Visp	1862
8	Nadelhorn	4327	207	46°06′32″N 07°51′51″E	Pennine Alps	Visp	1858
9	Grand Combin (de Grafeneire)	4309	1512	45°56′15″N 07°17′57″E	Pennine Alps	Entremont	1859
10	Finsteraarhorn	4274	2279	46°32′14″N 08°07′34″E	Bernese Alps	Goms	1829
11	Castor	4225	156	45°55′20″N 07°47′34″E	Pennine Alps	Visp	1861
12	Zinalrothorn	4221	491	46°03′54″N 07°41′25″E	Pennine Alps	Sierre/Visp	1864
13	Alphubel	4206	359	46°03′47″N 07°51′50″E	Pennine Alps	Visp	1860
14	Rimpfischhorn	4199	647	46°01′24″N 07°53′03″E	Pennine Alps	Visp	1859
15	Aletschhorn	4194	1034	46°27′54″N 07°59′38″E	Bernese Alps	Brig/Raron	1859
16	Strahlhorn	4190	404	46°00′48″N 07°54′06″E	Pennine Alps	Visp	1854
17	Dent d'Hérens	4173	704	45°58′12″N 07°36′19″E	Pennine Alps	Visp	1863
18	Breithorn	4160	438	45°56′28″N 07°44′56″E	Pennine Alps	Visp	1813
19	Jungfrau	4158	694	46°32′12″N 07°57′45″E	Bernese Alps	Goms	1811
20	Mönch	4110	591	46°33′30″N 07°59′50″E	Bernese Alps	Goms	1857
21	Pollux	4089	243	45°55′40″N 07°47′07″E	Pennine Alps	Visp	1864
22	Ober Gabelhorn	4063	536	46°02′19″N 07°40′05″E	Pennine Alps	Sierre/Visp	1865
23	Gross Fiescherhorn	4049	396	46°33′05″N 08°03′41″E	Bernese Alps	Goms	1862
24	Gross Grünhorn	4043	303	46°31′55″N 08°04′40″E	Bernese Alps	Goms	1865
25	Allalinhorn	4027	257	46°02′46″N 07°53′41″E	Pennine Alps	Visp	1856
26	Weissmies	4013	1183	46°07′40″N 08°00′44″E	Pennine Alps	Visp	1855
27	Lagginhorn	4010	512	46°09′26″N 08°00′11″E	Pennine Alps	Visp	1856
28	Fletschhorn	3985	300	46°10′04″N 08°00′11″E	Pennine Alps	Visp	1854
29	Gletscherhorn	3982	355	46°30′46″N 07°58′04″E	Bernese Alps	Goms	1867
30	Schalihorn	3975	225	46°05′04″N 07°42′18″E	Pennine Alps	Visp	
31	Grand Cornier	3962	431	46°03′07″N 07°36′41″E	Pennine Alps	Hérens/Sierre	1865
32	Ebnefluh	3961	201	46°30′29″N 07°57′11″E	Bernese Alps	Goms	
33	Agassizhorn	3947	200	46°32′48″N 08°06′52″E	Bernese Alps	Goms	
34	Bietschhorn	3934	807	46°23′30″N 07°51′03″E	Bernese Alps	Raron/Visp	1859
35	Trugberg	3932	308	46°32′48″N 08°00′55″E	Bernese Alps	Goms	1871
36	Gross Wannenhorn	3906	636	46°29′38″N 08°05′49″E	Bernese Alps	Goms	1864
37	Aiguille d'Argentière	3898	473	45°57′36″N 07°01′12″E	Mont Blanc massif	Entremont	1864
38	Mittaghorn	3893	197	46°29′54″N 07°55′47″E	Bernese Alps	Goms/Raron	
39	Fiescher Gabelhorn	3876	152	46°30′08″N 08°05′03″E	Bernese Alps	Goms	
40	Ruinette	3875	851	45°58′45″N 07°24′01″E	Pennine Alps	Entremont	1865
41	Mont Blanc de Cheilon	3870	174	45°59′35″N 07°25′02″E	Pennine Alps	Entremont/Hérens	1865
42	Bouquetins	3838	490	45°58′56″N 07°32′43″E	Pennine Alps	Hérens	1871
43	Tour Noir	3837	302	45°56′56″N 07°02′15″E	Mont Blanc massif	Entremont	1876
44	Brunegghorn	3831	304	46°07′33″N 07°44′45″E	Pennine Alps	Visp	
45	Nesthorn	3820	658	46°24′48″N 07°55′34″E	Bernese Alps	Brig	1865
46	Mont Dolent	3820	330	45°55′21″N 07°02′46″E	Mont Blanc massif	Entremont	1864
47	Dreieckhorn	3811	192	46°28′41″N 08°01′12″E	Bernese Alps	Goms	
48	Cima di Jazzi	3792	241	45°58′52″N 07°53′41″E	Pennine Alps	Visp	
49	Tête de Valpelline	3799	234	45°58′31″N 07°34′52″E	Pennine Alps	Visp	
50	Schinhorn	3796	422	46°27′06″N 07°56′48″E	Bernese Alps	Brig/Raron	1869
51	Balfrin	3796	235	46°08′06″N 07°52′49″E	Pennine Alps	Visp	
52	Pointe de Zinal	3789	301	46°01′37″N 07°37′50″E	Pennine Alps	Sierre/Visp	1870
53	La Serpentine	3789	247	45°59′04″N 07°26′00″E	Pennine Alps	Entremont/Hérens	
54	Pigne d'Arolla	3787	154	45°59′28″N 07°27′18″E	Pennine Alps	Entremont/Hérens	1865
55	Breithorn (Blatten)	3785	282	46°26′08″N 07°53′38″E	Bernese Alps	Brig/Raron/Visp	
56	Breithorn (Lauterbrunnen)	3780	464	46°28′43″N 07°52′36″E	Bernese Alps	Raron	1865
57	Grosshorn	3754	194	46°29′12″N 07°54′39″E	Bernese Alps	Raron	
58	Geisshorn	3740	158	46°26′28″N 08°00′21″E	Bernese Alps	Brig	
59	Mont Vélan	3726	620	45°53′30″N 07°15′06″E	Pennine Alps	Entremont	1779
60	Evêque	3716	647	45°57′52″N 07°30′10″E	Pennine Alps	Hérens	1867
61	Combin de Corbassière	3716	312	45°58′41″N 07°16′50″E	Pennine Alps	Entremont	1851
62	La Singla	3714	452	45°56′45″N 07°28′19″E	Pennine Alps	Entremont	1867
63	Mont Durand	3713	169	46°02′02″N 07°39′02″E	Pennine Alps	Sierre/Visp	
64	Tête Blanche	3710	158	45°59′15″N 07°34′30″E	Pennine Alps	Hérens/Visp	
65	Le Pleureur	3704	467	46°00′59″N 07°22′09″E	Pennine Alps	Entremont/Hérens	1867
66	Tournelon Blanc	3700	159	45°58′11″N 07°19′20″E	Pennine Alps	Entremont	
67	Balmhorn	3697	1020	46°25′30″N 07°41′37″E	Bernese Alps	Leuk	1864
68	Grande Aiguille	3682	223	45°57′01″N 07°15′53″E	Pennine Alps	Entremont	
69	Pointe Kurz	3676	174	45°56′18″N 07°02′08″E	Mont Blanc massif	Entremont	
70	Dent de Perroc	3676	408	46°02′22″N 07°31′23″E	Pennine Alps	Hérens	1871
71	Aiguille de la Tsa	3668	251	46°01′17″N 07°31′20″E	Pennine Alps	Hérens	
72	Combin de Boveire	3663	173	45°57′53″N 07°16′15″E	Pennine Alps	Entremont	
73	Portjengrat (Pizzo d'Andolla)	3654	411	46°06′03″N 08°02′05″E	Pennine Alps	Brig/Visp	1871
74	Aiguilles Rouges d'Arolla	3644	789	46°03′19″N 07°26′01″E	Pennine Alps	Hérens	1870
75	Mont Collon	3637	208	45°58′35″N 07°30′17″E	Pennine Alps	Hérens	1867
76	Studerhorn	3632	230	46°31′58″N 08°08′52″E	Bernese Alps	Goms	
77	Oberaarhorn	3631	260	46°31′53″N 08°10′28″E	Bernese Alps	Goms	
78	Dammastock	3630	1466	46°38′36″N 08°25′16″E	Uri Alps	Goms	1864
79	Grande Fourche	3610	275	45°58′35″N 07°01′16″E	Mont Blanc massif	Entremont	
80	Barrhorn	3610	267	46°09′21″N 07°44′03″E	Pennine Alps	Leuk/Visp	
81	Les Diablons	3609	379	46°08′33″N 07°40′16″E	Pennine Alps	Leuk/Sierre	1863
82	Galenstock	3586	252	46°36′43″N 08°25′01″E	Uri Alps	Goms	1845
83	Mont Brulé	3578	365	45°57′18″N 07°32′18″E	Pennine Alps	Hérens	1876
84	Tschingelhorn	3555	389	46°28′43″N 07°50′55″E	Bernese Alps	Raron	1865
85	Petit Mont Collon	3556	264	45°58′04″N 07°28′52″E	Pennine Alps	Hérens	
86	Aouille Tseuque	3554	345	45°55′49″N 07°26′35″E	Pennine Alps	Entremont	
87	Monte Leone	3553	1144	46°14′58″N 08°06′36″E	Lepontine Alps	Brig	1859
88	La Luette	3548	179	46°00′37″N 07°23′15″E	Pennine Alps	Entremont/Hérens	
89	Aiguille du Tour	3540	259	45°59′40″N 07°00′35″E	Mont Blanc massif	Martigny	1875
90	Bec d'Epicoune	3531	298	45°54′53″N 07°25′21″E	Pennine Alps	Entremont	1866
91	Finsteraarrothorn	3530	195	46°31′04″N 08°08′52″E	Bernese Alps	Goms	
92	Aiguilles Dorées	3519	258	45°58′57″N 07°02′00″E	Mont Blanc massif	Entremont/Martigny	
93	Mont Gelé	3518	619	45°54′15″N 07°21′58″E	Pennine Alps	Entremont	1861
94	Galmihorn	3507	202	46°30′24″N 08°11′05″E	Bernese Alps	Goms	
95	Pointe de Bertol	3499	190	46°00′35″N 07°31′42″E	Pennine Alps	Hérens	
96	Furgggrat	3492	197	45°57′25″N 07°40′53″E	Pennine Alps	Visp	
97	Pointe de Vouasson	3490	154	46°04′20″N 07°25′31″E	Pennine Alps	Hérens	
98	Sonnighorn/Pizzo Bottarello	3487	340	46°04′27″N 08°01′20″E	Pennine Alps	Visp	1879
99	Oberaarrothorn	3477	184	46°31′13″N 08°10′51″E	Bernese Alps	Goms	
100	Rinderhorn	3449	414	46°24′49″N 07°39′15″E	Bernese Alps	Leuk	1854
101	Wasenhorn	3447	303	46°29′53″N 08°09′57″E	Bernese Alps	Goms	1885
102	Stellihorn	3436	598	46°02′11″N 08°00′03″E	Pennine Alps	Visp	
103	Oberrothorn	3414	259	46°01′39″N 07°48′46″E	Pennine Alps	Goms	
104	(Inners) Stellihorn	3410	175	46°10′01″N 07°44′22″E	Pennine Alps	Leuk/Visp	1890
105	Mettelhorn	3406	240	46°03′26″N 07°44′33″E	Pennine Alps	Visp	
106	Pointe d'Otemma	3403	224	45°56′37″N 07°23′53″E	Pennine Alps	Entremont	
107	Blinnenhorn/Corno Cieco	3374	945	46°25′33″N 08°18′28″E	Lepontine Alps	Goms	1866
108	Egginer	3367	378	46°04′31″N 07°55′48″E	Pennine Alps	Visp	
109	Mont Avril	3347	158	45°54′55″N 07°20′40″E	Pennine Alps	Entremont	
110	Le Portalet	3344	177	45°59′25″N 07°03′23″E	Mont Blanc massif	Entremont	
111	Rosablanche	3336	227	46°03′36″N 07°21′15″E	Pennine Alps	Conthey/Entremont/Hérens	
112	Mont Fort	3329	408	46°04′52″N 07°19′07″E	Pennine Alps	Conthey/Entremont	1866
113	Garde de Bordon	3310	249	46°07′15″N 07°35′50″E	Pennine Alps	Sierre	
114	Wilerhorn	3307	238	46°22′43″N 07°48′38″E	Bernese Alps	Raron	
115	Hockenhorn	3293	350	46°25′42″N 07°44′39″E	Bernese Alps	Raron	1840
116	Färichhorn	3292	248	46°09′20″N 07°51′32″E	Pennine Alps	Visp	
117	Hogleifa	3276	148	46°22′15″N 07°47′35″E	Bernese Alps	Raron	
118	Helsenhorn	3272	586	46°18′17″N 08°11′30″E	Lepontine Alps	Goms	1863
119	Pointe d'Orny	3271	183	46°00′08″N 07°02′34″E	Mont Blanc massif	Entremont/Martigny	
120	Dents du Midi (Haute Cime)	3257	1796	46°09′40″N 06°55′24″E	Chablais Alps	Monthey/Saint-Maurice	1784
121	Sasseneire	3254	386	46°08′19″N 07°31′31″E	Pennine Alps	Hérens/Sierre	1835
122	Wildhorn	3250	981	46°21′21″N 07°21′44″E	Bernese Alps	Hérens	1843
123	Wasenhorn / Punta Terrarossa	3246	476	46°15′59″N 08°05′08″E	Lepontine Alps	Brig	1844
124	Platthorn	3246	361	46°09′59″N 07°51′40″E	Pennine Alps	Visp	
125	Turbhorn	3246	228	46°24′29″N 08°16′50″E	Lepontine Alps	Goms	
126	Mattwaldhorn	3246	223	46°11′56″N 07°57′16″E	Pennine Alps	Visp	
127	Wildstrubel	3244	816	46°24′01″N 07°31′43″E	Bernese Alps	Leuk	1855
128	Grossstrubel	3243	157	46°24′46″N 07°33′45″E	Bernese Alps	Leuk	
129	Grand Golliat	3238	313	45°51′33″N 07°06′06″E	Pennine Alps	Entremont	1879
130	Ofenhorn / Punta d'Arbola	3235	334	46°23′12″N 08°19′07″E	Lepontine Alps	Goms	1864
131	Bec des Rosses	3223	283	46°04′19″N 07°17′56″E	Pennine Alps	Entremont	
132	Tour Sallière	3220	726	46°07′37″N 06°55′29″E	Chablais Alps	Saint-Maurice	1858
133	Le Métailler	3213	302	46°06′14″N 07°21′37″E	Pennine Alps	Conthey/Hérens	
134	Pointe de Boveire	3212	178	45°59′40″N 07°14′24″E	Pennine Alps	Entremont	
135	Scherbadung / Pizzo Cervandone	3211	716	46°19′27″N 08°13′23″E	Lepontine Alps	Goms	1886
136	Diablerets	3216	974	46°18′14″N 07°11′20″E	Vaud Alps	Conthey	1850
137	Schwarzhorn	3201	308	46°13′00″N 07°45′24″E	Pennine Alps	Leuk/Visp	
138	Strahlhorn	3201	213	46°23′10″N 07°50′30″E	Bernese Alps	Brig/Visp	
139	Bortelhorn/ Punta del Rebbio	3194	430	46°17′41″N 08°07′31″E	Lepontine Alps	Goms	1869
140	Pizzo Rotondo	3192	752	46°31′03″N 08°27′58″E	Lepontine Alps	Goms	1869
141	Hübschhorn I	3192	325	46°14′13″N 08°03′19″E	Lepontine Alps	Brig	
142	Spechhorn / Pizzo d'Antigine	3189	355	46°00′44″N 08°00′04″E	Pennine Alps	Goms	
143	Gärstenhörner	3189	200	46°35′54″N 08°21′42″E	Uri Alps	Goms	
144	Dent Jaune	3186	184	46°09′58″N 06°55′46″E	Chablais Alps	Monthey/Saint-Maurice	
145	Hillehorn	3181	257	46°18′11″N 08°08′25″E	Lepontine Alps	Brig/Raron	
146	Ferdenrothorn	3180	268	46°24′32″N 07°42′28″E	Bernese Alps	Leuk/Raron	
147	Cime de l'Est	3178	169	46°10′21″N 06°56′50″E	Chablais Alps	Monthey/Saint-Maurice	
148	Wyssegga	3168	178	46°11′56″N 07°44′54″E	Pennine Alps	Leuk/Visp	
149	Steitalhorn	3164	172	46°12′14″N 07°45′37″E	Pennine Alps	Visp	
150	Couronne de Bréona	3159	172	46°05′30″N 07°34′14″E	Pennine Alps	Hérens/Sierre	
151	Becs de Bosson	3149	362	46°10′04″N 07°31′05″E	Pennine Alps	Hérens/Sierre	
152	Steghorn	3147	279	46°25′00″N 07°35′03″E	Bernese Alps	Leuk	
153	Alpjuhorn	3144	263	46°22′02″N 07°54′31″E	Bernese Alps	Brig/Visp	
154	Oldenhorn	3123	307	46°19′45″N 07°13′18″E	Vaud Alps	Sion	
155	Schilthorn	3122	157	46°21′38″N 07°54′43″E	Bernese Alps	Brig	
156	Vordere Helse	3106	167	46°18′54″N 08°10′55″E	Lepontine Alps	Raron	
157	Gross Muttenhorn	3099	292	46°32′48″N 08°25′38″E	Lepontine Alps	Goms	
158	Löffelhorn	3096	167	46°31′36″N 08°14′13″E	Bernese Alps	Goms	
159	Gischihorn	3083	160	46°18′58″N 08°12′53″E	Pennine Alps	Goms	
160	Tellispitza	3081	182	46°27′05″N 07°49′01″E	Bernese Alps	Raron	
161	Pointe de Tourtemagne	3080	206	46°12′16″N 07°39′42″E	Pennine Alps	Leuk/Sierre	
162	Pointe du Tsaté	3078	162	46°06′34″N 07°32′56″E	Pennine Alps	Hérens/Sierre	
163	Hirsihorn	3076	162	46°11′13″N 07°39′32″E	Pennine Alps	Leuk/Sierre	
164	Chüebodenhorn	3070	316	46°30′29″N 08°27′11″E	Lepontine Alps	Goms	
165	Gross Leckihorn	3068	222	46°32′09″N 08°27′51″E	Lepontine Alps	Goms	
166	Geltenhorn	3062	305	46°20′47″N 07°20′04″E	Bernese Alps	Sion	
167	Stotzig Muttenhorn	3062	229	46°32′15″N 08°26′37″E	Lepontine Alps	Goms	
168	Pizzo Gallina	3061	378	46°29′41″N 08°23′31″E	Lepontine Alps	Goms	
169	Mont Ruan	3057	227	46°07′27″N 06°54′10″E	Chablais Alps	Saint-Maurice	
170	Majinghorn	3053	231	46°23′28″N 07°41′21″E	Bernese Alps	Leuk/Raron	
171	Diablon	3053	154	46°08′29″N 07°32′49″E	Pennine Alps	Sierre	
172	Grand Muveran	3051	1013	46°14′14″N 07°07′34″E	Vaud Alps	Martigny	
173	Joderhorn	3036	190	45°59′46″N 07°59′21″E	Pennine Alps	Visp	
174	Ginalshorn	3027	187	46°14′14″N 07°44′26″E	Pennine Alps	Leuk/Raron	
175	Bella Tola	3025	235	46°13′53″N 07°38′46″E	Pennine Alps	Leuk/Sierre	
176	Mont Gelé	3023	219	46°05′49″N 07°16′45″E	Pennine Alps	Conthey/Entremont/Martigny	
177	Tennbachhorn	3012	158	46°26′07″N 07°47′12″E	Bernese Alps	Raron	
178	Pic d'Artsinol	2998	296	46°06′54″N 07°25′37″E	Pennine Alps	Hérens	
179	Trubelstock	2998	158	46°22′13″N 07°34′19″E	Bernese Alps	Leuk/Sierre	
180	Mont Bonvin	2995	242	46°21′52″N 07°30′28″E	Bernese Alps	Sierre	
181	Furggubäumhorn	2985	253	46°16′47″N 08°06′20″E	Lepontine Alps	Brig	
182	Schijenhorn	2980	152	46°07′43″N 08°04′10″E	Pennine Alps	Brig	
183	La Tsavre	2978	305	45°54′56″N 07°07′46″E	Pennine Alps	Entremont	
184	Les Faverges	2971	177	46°22′31″N 07°31′44″E	Bernese Alps	Sierre	
185	Augstbordhorn	2971	168	46°14′06″N 07°47′43″E	Pennine Alps	Raron/Visp	
186	Haut de Cry	2969	525	46°14′25″N 07°11′42″E	Vaud Alps	Conthey	
187	Dent de Morcles	2969	465	46°11′57″N 07°04′32″E	Vaud Alps	Martigny/Saint-Maurice	1787
188	Gärsthorn	2964	208	46°20′49″N 07°55′00″E	Bernese Alps	Brig	
189	Pointe de Barasson	2963	205	45°51′47″N 07°12′03″E	Pennine Alps	Entremont	
190	Bättlihorn	2951	388	46°19′57″N 08°05′38″E	Lepontine Alps	Goms	
191	Monts Telliers	2951	216	45°53′56″N 07°08′38″E	Pennine Alps	Entremont	
192	Pointe de Drône	2950	254	45°52′44″N 07°09′26″E	Pennine Alps	Entremont	
193	Rohrbachstein	2950	209	46°22′35″N 07°27′44″E	Bernese Alps	Hérens/Sierre	
194	Gross Schinhorn/Punta di Valdeserta	2939	465	46°21′40″N 08°15′39″E	Lepontine Alps	Goms	
195	Schnidehorn	2937	181	46°22′23″N 07°23′34″E	Bernese Alps	Hérens	
196	Riffelhorn	2928	152	45°58′53″N 07°45′30″E	Pennine Alps	Visp	
197	Eggishorn	2927	563	46°25′53″N 08°05′39″E	Bernese Alps	Goms	
198	Poncione di Manió	2925	230	46°29′48″N 08°26′11″E	Lepontine Alps	Goms	
199	Sanetschhorn	2924	187	46°20′18″N 07°15′46″E	Bernese Alps	Sion	
200	Dent Favre	2917	315	46°12′37″N 07°06′14″E	Vaud Alps	Martigny	
201	Six des Eaux Froides	2905	257	46°20′49″N 07°24′12″E	Bernese Alps	Hérens	
202	Tête à Pierre Grept	2904	165	46°15′10″N 07°09′19″E	Bernese Alps	Conthey	
203	Pizzo Nero	2904	163	46°29′33″N 08°24′44″E	Lepontine Alps	Goms	
204	Mont Fourchon	2902	206	45°52′07″N 07°08′00″E	Pennine Alps	Entremont	
205	Grand Chavalard	2899	446	46°10′43″N 07°06′47″E	Vaud Alps	Martigny	
206	Sex Rouge	2893	184	46°19′59″N 07°22′35″E	Bernese Alps	Hérens/Sion	
207	Punta della Rossa	2887	162	46°20′25″N 08°14′55″E	Lepontine Alps	Goms	
208	Albrunhorn	2885	221	46°21′49″N 08°17′01″E	Lepontine Alps	Goms	
209	Le Génépi	2884	219	46°01′29″N 07°02′39″E	Mont Blanc massif	Entremont/Martigny	
210	Bettmergrat	2872	150	46°25′05″N 08°04′57″E	Bernese Alps	Goms/Raron	
211	Mont de la Fouly	2871	190	46°19′59″N 07°22′35″E	Bernese Alps	Entremont	
212	Mont Mort	2867	232	45°51′49″N 07°10′43″E	Pennine Alps	Entremont	
213	Nufenenstock	2866	381	46°28′01″N 08°23′18″E	Lepontine Alps	Goms	
214	Becca de Sery	2863	214	46°00′38″N 07°16′50″E	Pennine Alps	Entremont	
215	Loicherspitza	2843	217	46°22′24″N 07°42′18″E	Bernese Alps	Leuk/Raron	
216	Pointe de la Finive	2838	189	46°04′26″N 06°53′31″E	Chablais Alps	Saint-Maurice	
217	Faldumrothorn	2832	192	46°21′57″N 07°42′26″E	Bernese Alps	Leuk/Raron	
218	Distelhorn	2830	180	46°11′10″N 07°52′15″E	Pennine Alps	Visp	
219	Tubang	2826	212	46°21′31″N 07°29′45″E	Bernese Alps	Sierre	
220	Le Sérac	2817	257	46°19′35″N 07°19′46″E	Bernese Alps	Sion	
221	Rothorn	2813	182	46°18′42″N 08°07′49″E	Lepontine Alps	Hérens	
222	Petit Muveran	2810	265	46°13′25″N 07°07′21″E	Bernese Alps	Martigny	
223	Spitzhorn	2807	209	46°22′30″N 07°18′38″E	Bernese Alps	Sion	
224	Galehorn	2797	176	46°13′18″N 07°58′59″E	Pennine Alps	Brig/Visp	
225	Le Luisin	2786	324	46°07′15″N 06°58′12″E	Chablais Alps	Saint-Maurice	
226	Felsenhorn	2782	176	46°25′43″N 07°36′37″E	Bernese Alps	Leuk	
227	Niwen	2769	167	46°21′40″N 07°42′46″E	Bernese Alps	Leuk/Raron	
228	Grampielhorn	2764	154	46°20′45″N 08°15′46″E	Pennine Alps	Goms	
229	Dent de Barme	2759	364	46°07′55″N 06°50′31″E	Chablais Alps	Monthey/Saint-Maurice	
230	Oberblatthorn	2756	158	46°18′53″N 08°06′50″E	Lepontine Alps	Brig/Raron	
231	Spitzhorli	2737	320	46°15′52″N 07°58′50″E	Pennine Alps	Brig	
232	Rochers de Gagnerie	2735	251	46°09′45″N 06°57′50″E	Chablais Alps	Saint-Maurice	
233	Dent de Chamosentse	2721	174	46°14′05″N 07°09′11″E	Bernese Alps	Conthey	
234	Illhorn	2717	235	46°15′46″N 07°36′58″E	Pennine Alps	Leuk/Sierre	
235	Tête de Ferret	2714	192	45°53′42″N 07°04′35″E	Pennine Alps	Entremont	
236	Pizzo Straciugo	2713	335	46°07′56″N 08°07′15″E	Pennine Alps	Brig	
237	Mont Gond	2710	395	46°17′08″N 07°15′49″E	Vaud Alps	Conthey	
238	Fontanabran	2703	222	46°05′59″N 06°56′18″E	Chablais Alps	Saint-Maurice	
239	Les Perrons	2674	179	46°03′19″N 06°54′49″E	Chablais Alps	Saint-Maurice	
240	Tochuhorn	2661	187	46°15′23″N 08°00′03″E	Pennine Alps	Brig	
241	Petits Perrons	2627	161	46°07′41″N 06°58′40″E	Chablais Alps	Saint-Maurice	
242	Pointe de Chemo	2626	170	46°13′25″N 07°08′46″E	Bernese Alps	Conthey	
243	Cima del Rosso	2624	232	46°06′54″N 08°06′36″E	Pennine Alps	Brig	
244	Magehorn	2621	179	46°14′01″N 07°58′49″E	Pennine Alps	Brig/Visp	
245	La Fava	2612	279	46°18′09″N 07°16′48″E	Bernese Alps	Conthey	
246	Stockhorn	2610	258	46°20′45″N 08°12′51″E	Lepontine Alps	Goms	
247	Le Catogne	2598	1100	46°03′15″N 07°06′39″E	Mont Blanc massif	Entremont	
248	Bec Rond	2563	181	45°57′30″N 07°08′46″E	Pennine Alps	Entremont	
249	Dent du Salantin	2482	270	46°09′05″N 06°59′45″E	Chablais Alps	Saint-Maurice	
250	Pierre Avoi	2473	300	46°07′05″N 07°12′01″E	Pennine Alps	Entremont/Martigny	
251	Seehorn	2434	567	46°10′57″N 08°06′56″E	Pennine Alps	Brig	
252	Cornettes de Bise	2432	1063	46°19′57″N 06°47′04″E	Chablais Alps	Monthey	
253	Pointe de Mossette	2277	193	46°11′27″N 06°48′58″E	Chablais Alps	Monthey	
254	Pointe de Chésery	2249	254	46°12′13″N 06°48′12″E	Chablais Alps	Monthey	
255	Tête du Géant	2232	172	46°13′12″N 06°48′59″E	Chablais Alps	Monthey	
256	Riederhorn	2230	165	46°22′17″N 08°00′58″E	Bernese Alps	Raron	
257	Les Jumelles	2215	365	46°21′08″N 06°48′49″E	Chablais Alps	Monthey	
258	Le Grammont	2172	1063	46°21′27″N 06°49′16″E	Chablais Alps	Monthey	
259	Pointe de l'Au	2152	202	46°12′01″N 06°50′28″E	Chablais Alps	Monthey	
260	Le Linleu	2093	279	46°18′57″N 06°49′02″E	Chablais Alps	Monthey	
261	Mont de l'Arpille	2085	557	46°04′38″N 07°00′24″E	Mont Blanc massif	Martigny	
262	Pointe de Bellevue	2042	355	46°15′27″N 06°53′15″E	Chablais Alps	Monthey	
263	Sex du Coeur	2019	154	46°19′14″N 06°48′25″E	Chablais Alps	Monthey	
264	Tour de Don	1998	263	46°17′22″N 06°51′44″E	Chablais Alps	Monthey	
265	Bec du Corbeau	1992	205	46°15′15″N 06°51′46″E	Chablais Alps	Monthey	
266	Croix de Culet	1963	155	46°10′32″N 06°50′44″E	Chablais Alps	Monthey	
267	Haut Sex	1961	155	46°17′59″N 06°50′05″E	Chablais Alps	Monthey	
268	La Crevasse	1808	202	46°05′34″N 07°08′12″E	Pennine Alps	Entremont	
269	La Braye	1788	155	46°19′08″N 06°50′24″E	Chablais Alps	Monthey	
270	Le Tâche	1691	251	46°20′40″N 06°50′53″E	Chablais Alps	Monthey	
271	L'Ardève	1501	220	46°11′51″N 07°11′57″E	Vaud Alps	Conthey/Martigny	

== See also ==
- List of mountains of Switzerland
- Swiss Alps
