= Stockhorn (disambiguation) =

The Stockhorn is a mountain located south of Thun in the Bernese Oberland. It is also the name of several other mountains:

- Stockhorn (Baltschiedertal), north of Baltschieder in Valais
- Stockhorn (Zermatt), south of Zermatt in Valais
- Stockhorn (Binntal), south of Binn in Valais
