= Pointe Ronde =

Mountain of the Mont Blanc massif

- Location within Switzerland

Highest point
- Elevation: 2,655 m (8,711 ft)
- Prominence: 25 m (82 ft)
- Coordinates: 46°02′27″N 7°01′12″E

Geography
- Location: Valais, Switzerland
- Parent range: Mont Blanc Massif

The Pointe Ronde is a mountain of the Mont Blanc massif, overlooking Trient in the canton of Valais. It lies near the northern end of the Arête de la Lys, the ridge descending in a north-westerly direction from the Génépi towards the Col de la Forclaz.
