= Poncione di Manió =

Mountain in Switzerland

- Location within Switzerland

Highest point
- Elevation: 2,925 m (9,596 ft)
- Prominence: 230 m (750 ft)
- Parent peak: Pizzo Gallina
- Coordinates: 46°29′48″N 8°26′11″E

Geography
- Location: Valais/Ticino, Switzerland
- Parent range: Lepontine Alps

The Poncione di Manió (2,925 m) is a mountain of the Lepontine Alps, located on the border between the Swiss cantons of Valais and Ticino. The mountain separates the Geretal from the Val Bedretto.
