= Le Tâche =

Mountain in Switzerland

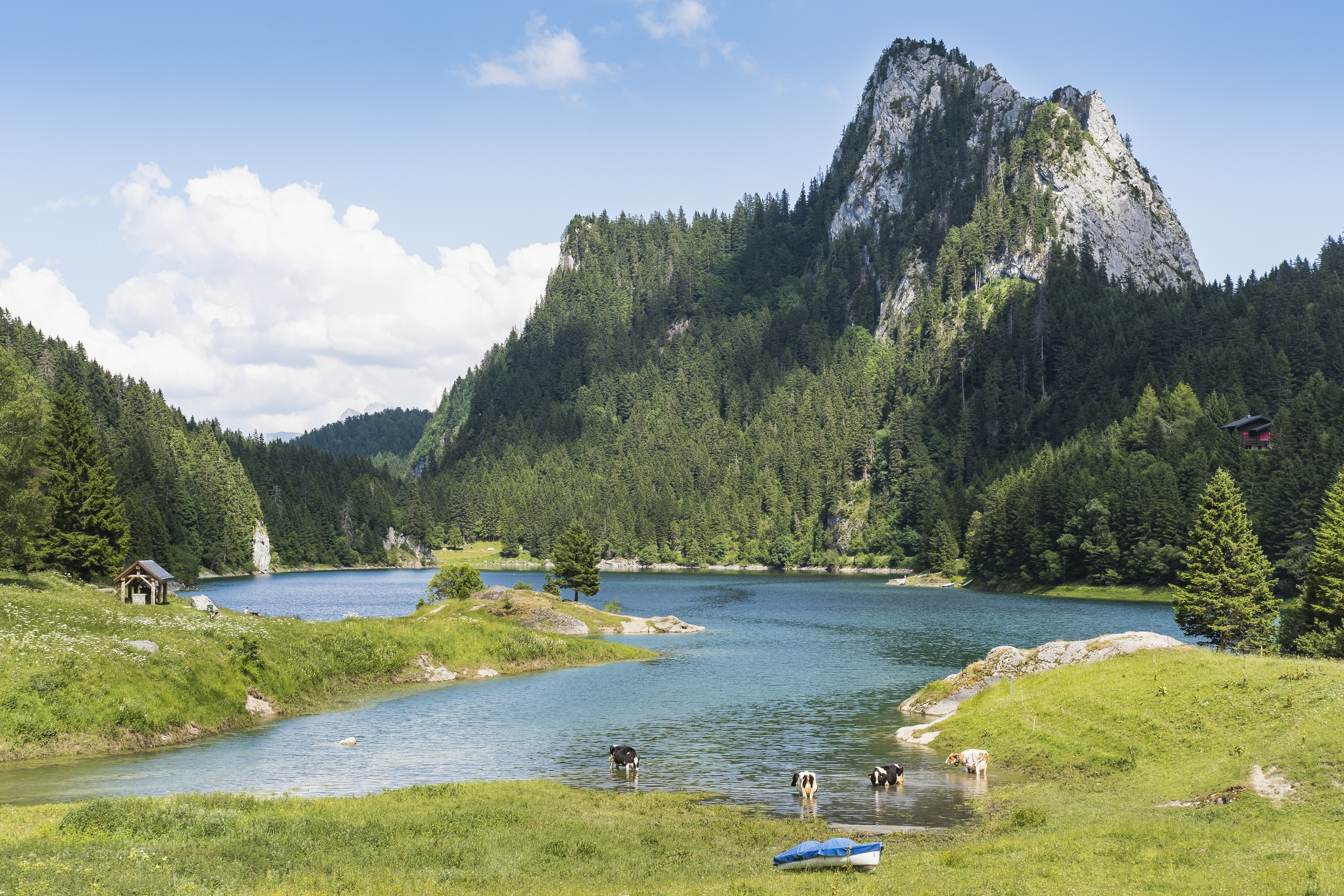
- View from the Lac de Taney

Highest point
- Elevation: 1,691 m (5,548 ft)
- Prominence: 251 m (823 ft)
- Parent peak: Cornettes de Bise
- Coordinates: 46°20′41″N 06°50′53″E

Geography
- Location within Switzerland
- Location: Valais, Switzerland
- Parent range: Chablais Alps

Le Tâche (French pronunciation: [lə taʃ]; 1,691 m) is a mountain of the Chablais Alps, overlooking the Rhone valley at Vouvry, in the canton of Valais. It lies east of the Lac de Taney.
