= Bec du Corbeau =

Mountain in Switzerland

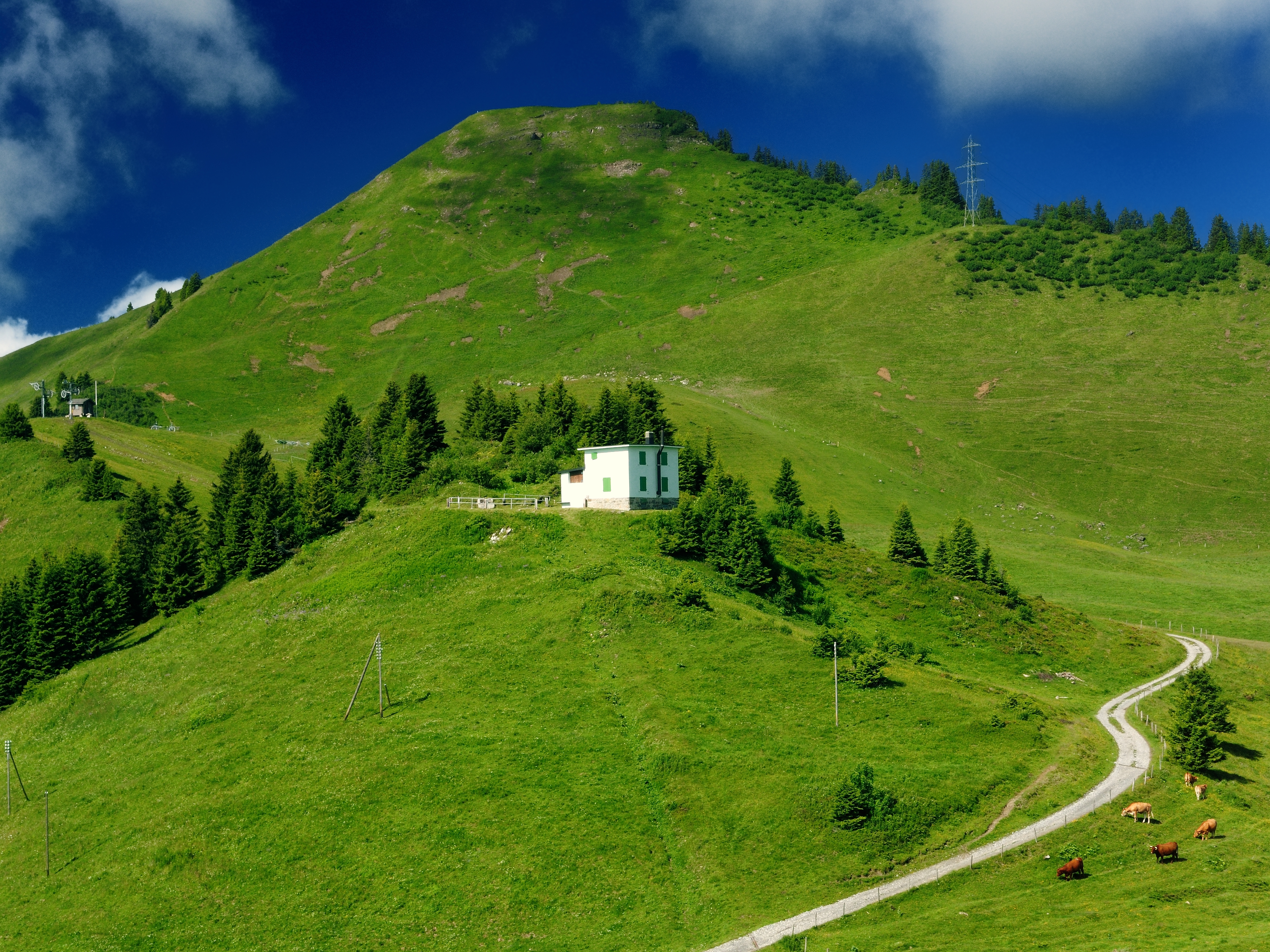
- View from Portes de Culet (east side)

Highest point
- Elevation: 1,992 m (6,535 ft)
- Prominence: 205 m (673 ft)
- Parent peak: Pointe de Bellevue
- Coordinates: 46°15′15″N 6°51′45.5″E

Geography
- Location within Switzerland
- Location: Valais, Switzerland
- Parent range: Chablais Alps

Climbing
- Easiest route: Trail

The Bec du Corbeau (1,992 m) is a mountain of the Chablais Alps, overlooking Morgins in the Swiss canton of Valais. It lies west of Pointe de Bellevue, on the watershed between the valleys of the Dranse d'Abondance and Illiez. The French border runs west of the mountain.
