= Pointe de Drône =

Mountain in Switzerland

- Location within Alps

Highest point
- Elevation: 2,950 m (9,680 ft)
- Prominence: 254 m (833 ft)
- Parent peak: Grande Rochère
- Coordinates: 45°52′44.4″N 7°9′26.1″E

Geography
- Location: Valais, Switzerland; Aosta Valley, Italy
- Parent range: Pennine Alps

The Pointe de Drône is a mountain of the Pennine Alps, located on the border between Italy and Switzerland. It lies west of the Great St. Bernard Pass.
