= Pizzo Nero =

Mountain in Switzerland

- Location within Switzerland

Highest point
- Elevation: 2,904 m (9,528 ft)
- Prominence: 163 m (535 ft)
- Parent peak: Pizzo Gallina
- Coordinates: 46°29′33″N 8°24′44″E

Geography
- Location: Valais/Ticino, Switzerland
- Parent range: Lepontine Alps

Pizzo Nero (2,904 m) is a mountain of the Lepontine Alps, located on the border between the Swiss cantons of Valais and Ticino. Its summit is the tripoint between the valleys of Geretal, Gonerli (upper Rhone) and Bedretto (upper Ticino).
