= Tête du Géant =

Mountain in Switzerland

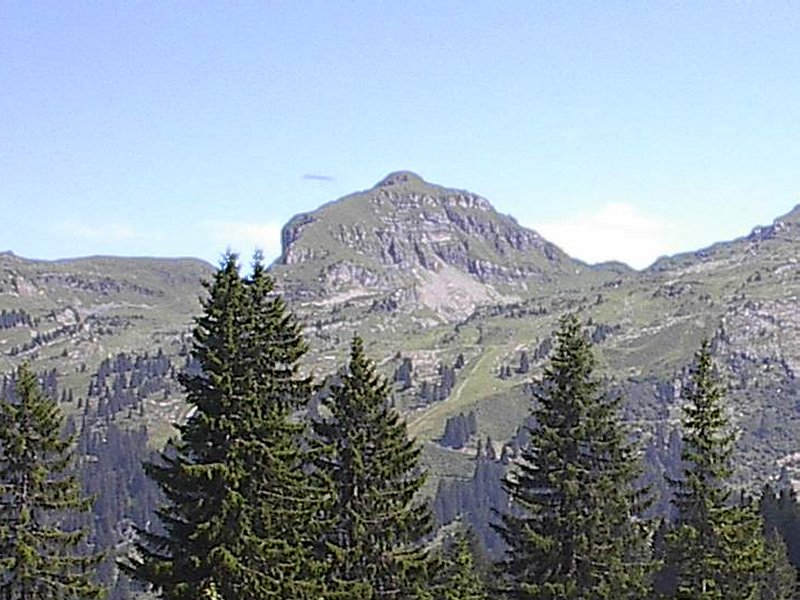
- Tête du Géant.

Highest point
- Elevation: 2,232 m (7,323 ft)
- Prominence: 172 m (564 ft)
- Parent peak: Pointe de Chésery
- Coordinates: 46°13′12″N 6°48′59″E

Geography
- Location within Alps
- Location: Valais, Switzerland / Haute-Savoie, France
- Parent range: Chablais Alps

Tête du Géant is a mountain in the Chablais Alps on the Swiss-French border.
