= Mont Fourchon =

Mountain in Switzerland

- Location within Alps

Highest point
- Elevation: 2,902 m (9,521 ft)
- Prominence: 206 m (676 ft)
- Coordinates: 45°52′05″N 7°07′58″E

Geography
- Location: Valais, Switzerland; Aosta Valley, Italy
- Parent range: Pennine Alps

Mont Fourchon is a mountain of the Pennine Alps, located on the border between Switzerland and Italy. It is located on the main chain of the Alps, approximately halfway between the Grand Golliat and the Great St Bernard Pass.
