= Monts Telliers =

Mountain in Switzerland

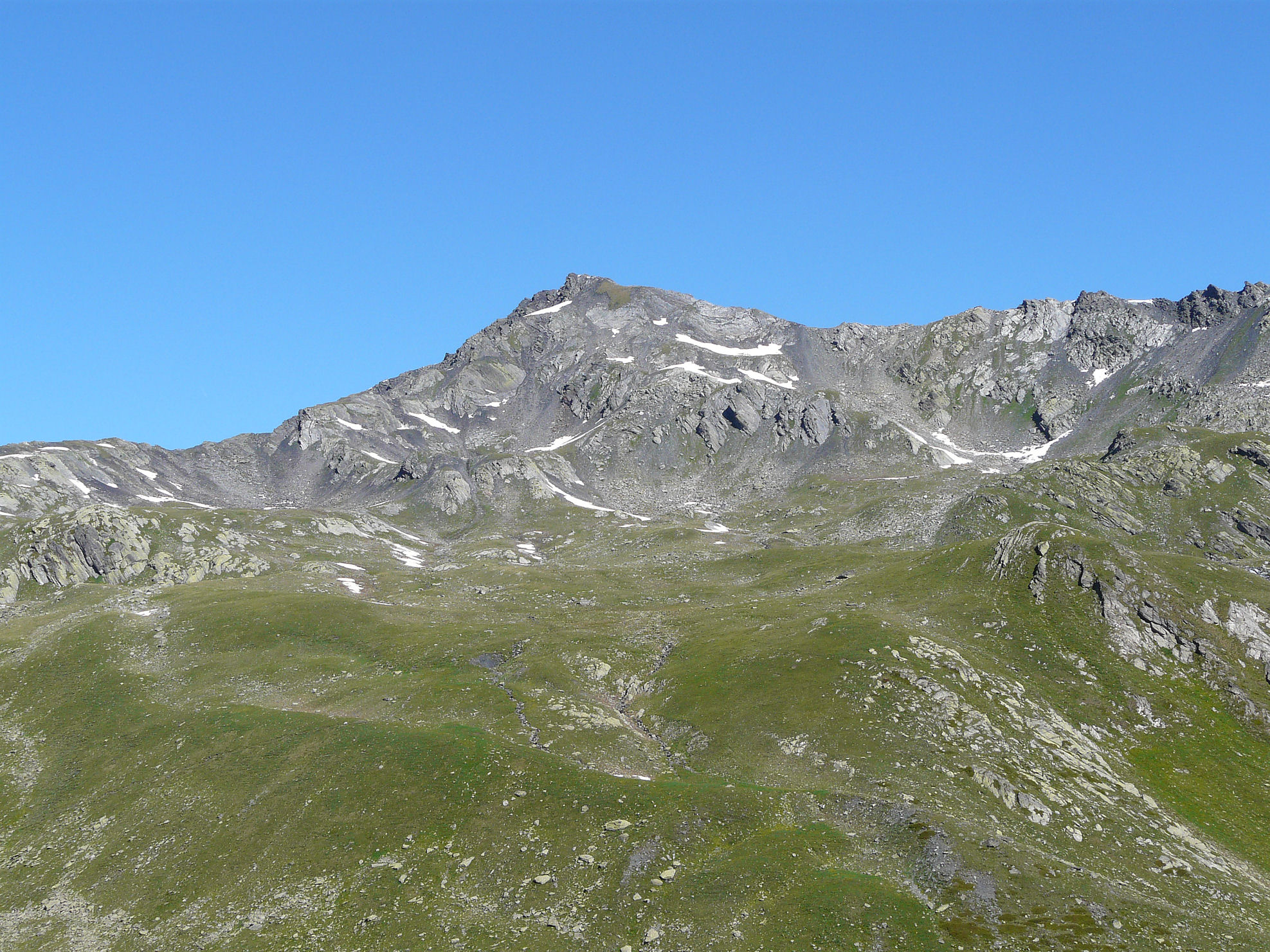

Highest point
- Elevation: 2,951 m (9,682 ft)
- Prominence: 216 m (709 ft)
- Parent peak: La Tsavre
- Coordinates: 45°53′56.1″N 07°08′37.9″E

Geography
- Location within Switzerland
- Location: Valais, Switzerland
- Parent range: Pennine Alps

Monts Telliers is a mountain with two twin peaks, located in the Pennine Alps of Switzerland. It is relatively easy to reach from the Swiss side of the ascent towards the Great St. Bernard Pass, especially by ski tours in winter through early spring, but also on foot during the summer. It offers a panorama featuring Mont Blanc, Grandes Jorasses and Grand Combin.

== Route (walking) ==
There is no marked path all the way to the top. Starting from La Pierre Alp (500 metres (1,600 ft) above the entrance to the Great St-Bernard Tunnel, on the right side of the road), the southern peak can be reached in about three hours by a walk with a few metres of very easy climbing during the final ascent to the peak. The walking path marked by a red line (white background) leads in parallel to the stream, up to the grassy, mildly inclined plateau of Combe de Drône, from which Col du Bastillon (2,757 metres (9,045 ft)) can be reached. From here, the route is not signposted any more, but the peak can be reached relatively easily, by heading towards the abandoned bunker slits, then climbing up on the right hand side on the ledge above them. From this point, it becomes a normal walk again, on manageable rocky terrain, all the way up to the southern peak with its imposing panorama.
