= Tête de Ferret =

Mountain in Switzerland

- Location within Alps

Highest point
- Elevation: 2,714 m (8,904 ft)
- Prominence: 192 m (630 ft)
- Parent peak: Grande Rochère
- Coordinates: 45°53′42.2″N 7°4′35.3″E

Geography
- Location: Valais, Switzerland; Aosta Valley, Italy
- Parent range: Pennine Alps

The Tête de Ferret is a mountain of the Pennine Alps on the Swiss-Italian border. It lies just east of the Mont Blanc massif, between the Swiss Val Ferret (Valais) and the Italian Val Ferret (Aosta Valley).
