= La Fava =

Mountain in Switzerland

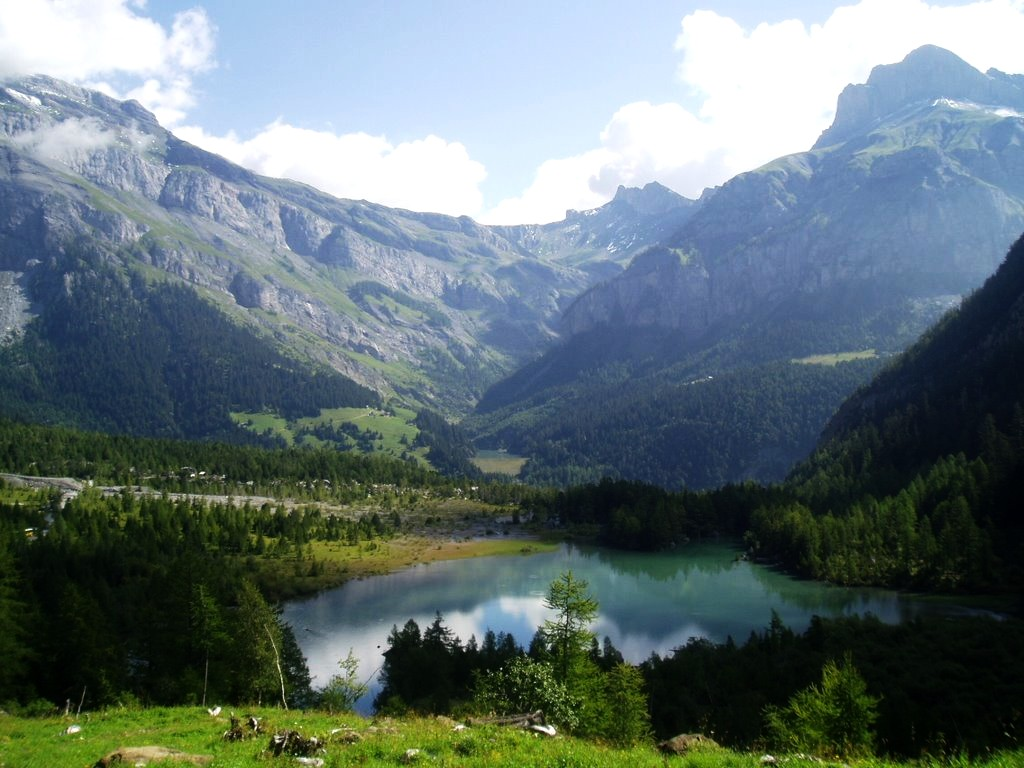
- La Fava (centre-right) and Mont Gond (right) from Derborence

Highest point
- Elevation: 2,612 m (8,570 ft)
- Prominence: 279 m (915 ft)
- Parent peak: Mont Gond
- Coordinates: 46°18′08.6″N 7°16′47.7″E

Geography
- Location within Switzerland
- Location: Switzerland
- Parent range: Vaud Alps

La Fava is a mountain in the Vaud Alps in Valais, between the Diablerets and the Rhone valley.
