= Rochers de Gagnerie =

Mountain in Switzerland

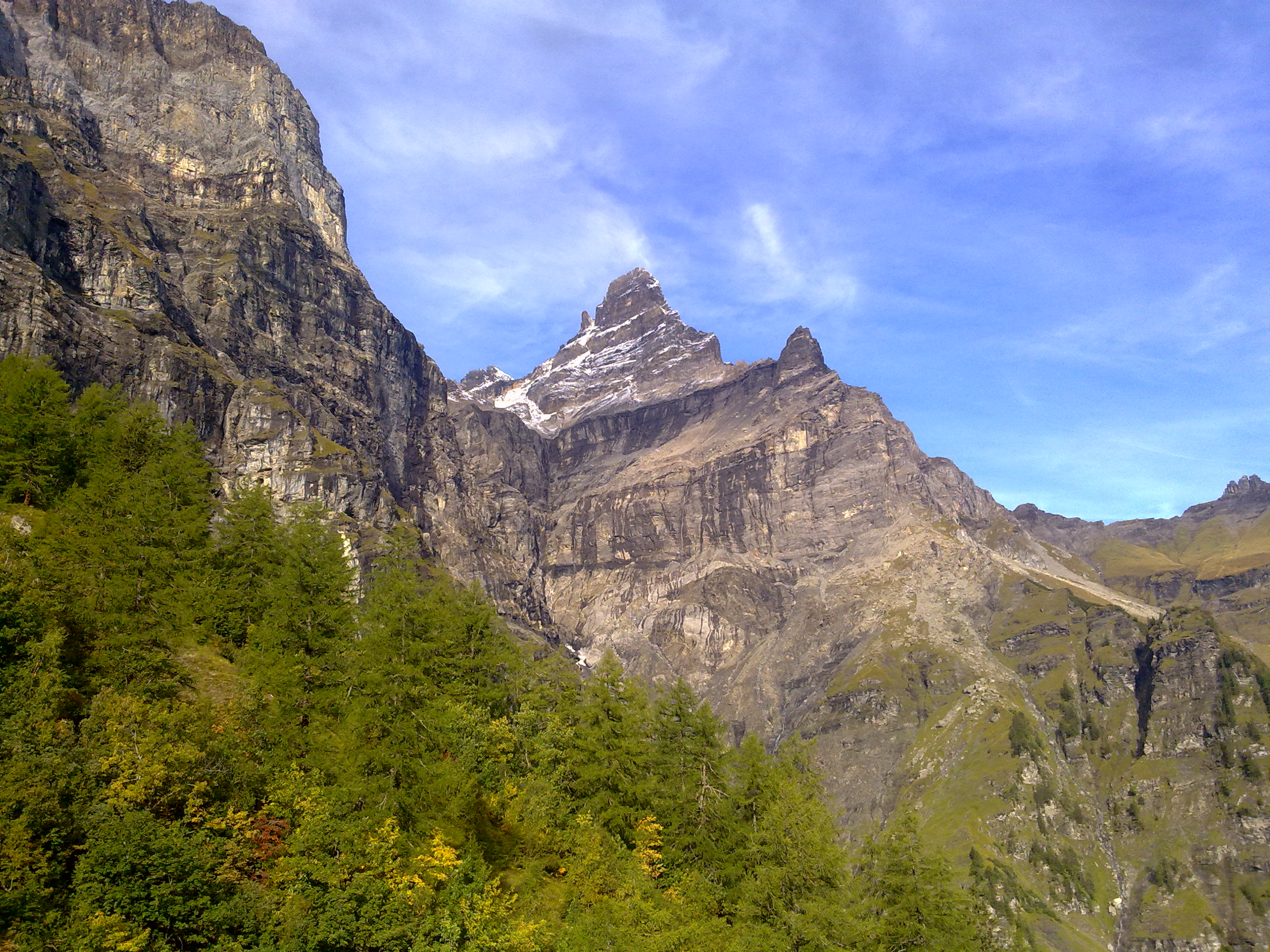
- View of the base of the mountain (left) and Cime de l'Est (centre)

Highest point
- Elevation: 2,735 m (8,973 ft)
- Prominence: 251 m (823 ft)
- Parent peak: Dents du Midi
- Coordinates: 46°09′45″N 6°57′49.5″E

Geography
- Location within Switzerland
- Location: Valais, Switzerland
- Parent range: Chablais Alps

The Rochers de Gagnerie (2,735 m) are a mountain of the Chablais Alps, overlooking the Lac de Salanfe in the canton of Valais. They lie in the massif of the Dents du Midi, forming a huge wall at the end of the Saint Barthélemy valley, south-west of Mex.

The mountain includes several secondary summits, among which the sharp needle of La Vierge (2,641 m).
