= Dent du Salantin =

Mountain in Switzerland

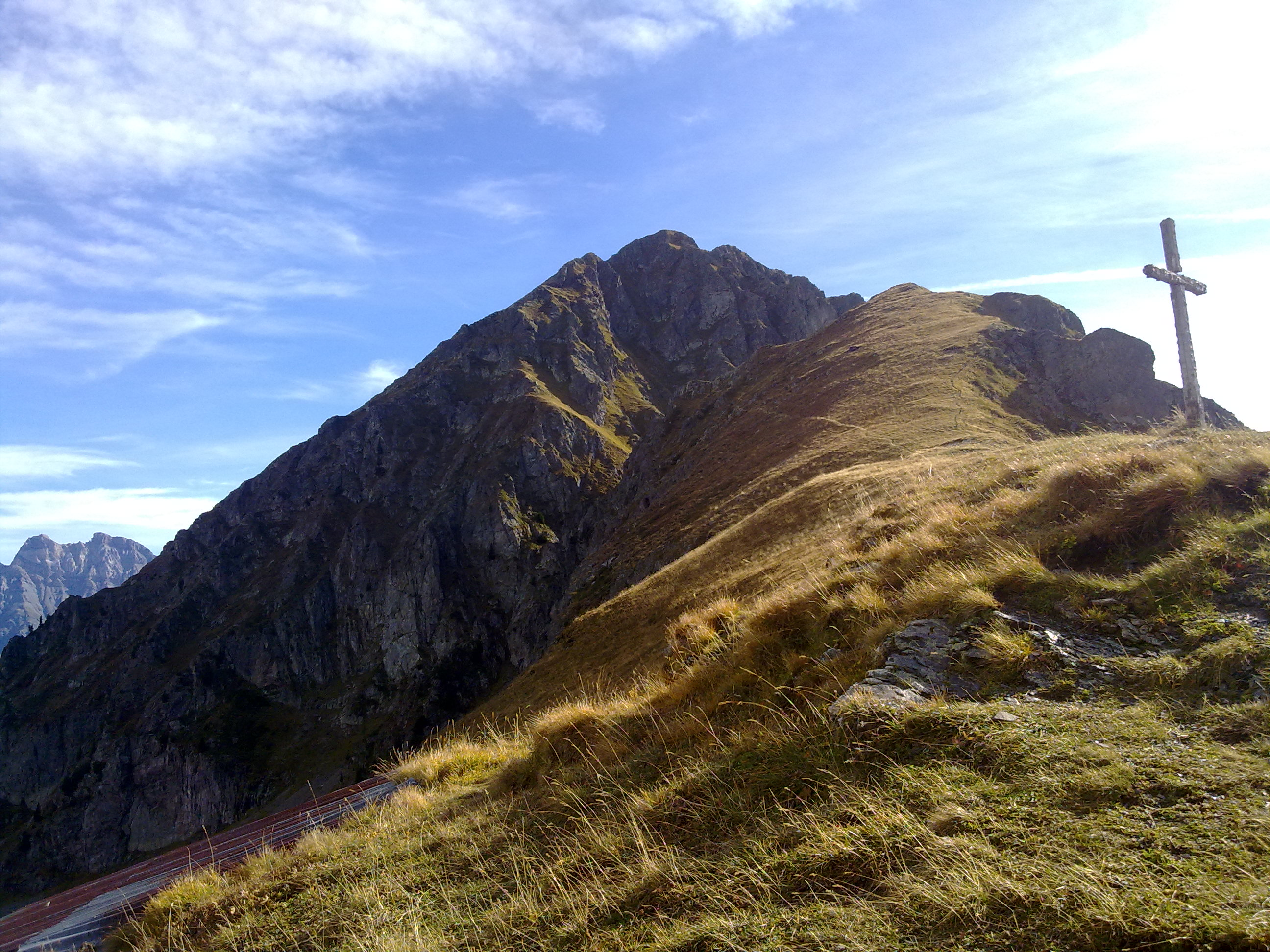
- View from Col du Jorat

Highest point
- Elevation: 2,482 m (8,143 ft)
- Prominence: 270 m (890 ft)
- Parent peak: Dents du Midi
- Coordinates: 46°09′05″N 6°59′45″E

Geography
- Location within Switzerland
- Location: Valais, Switzerland
- Parent range: Chablais Alps

The Dent du Salantin is a mountain of the Chablais Alps, overlooking the Rhone valley between Evionnaz and Vernayaz, in the canton of Valais. It lies in the massif of the Dents du Midi, east of Lac de Salanfe.
