= Stockhorn (Baltschiedertal) =

Mountain in Switzerland

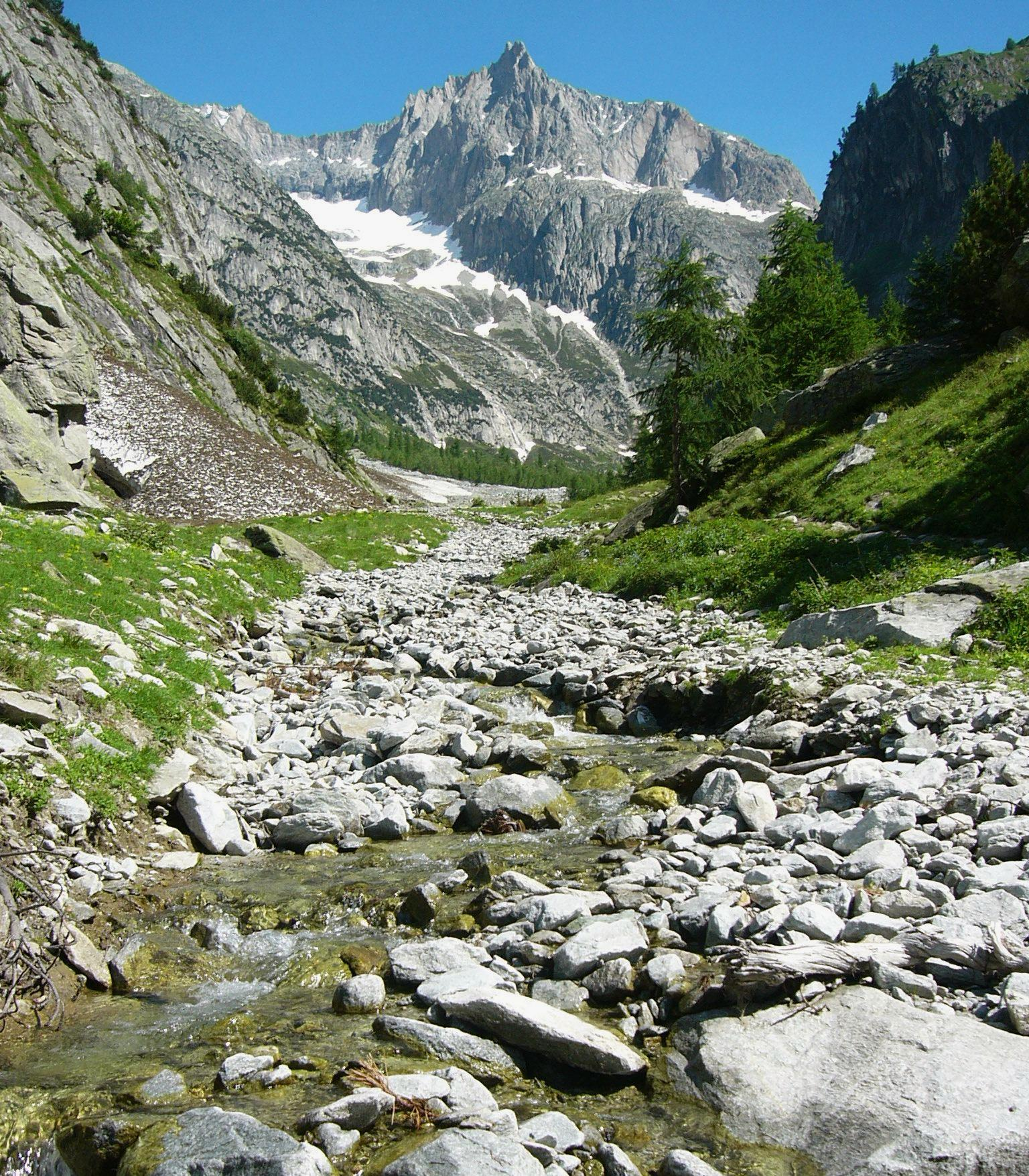
- The Stockhorn from the Baltschiedertal (south side)

Highest point
- Elevation: 3,212 m (10,538 ft)
- Prominence: 102 m (335 ft)
- Parent peak: Bietschhorn
- Coordinates: 46°22′56.5″N 7°52′37.5″E

Geography
- Location within Switzerland
- Location: Valais, Switzerland
- Parent range: Bernese Alps

The Stockhorn (3,212 m) is a mountain of the Bernese Alps, located north of Baltschieder in the canton of Valais. It overlooks the Baltschiedertal and lies south of the Bietschhorn.

On the south side of the mountain is located the Stockhornbiwak (2,598 m), a mountain shelter operated by the Swiss Alpine Club.
