= Les Perrons =

Mountain in the Chablais Alps

- Grand Perrron
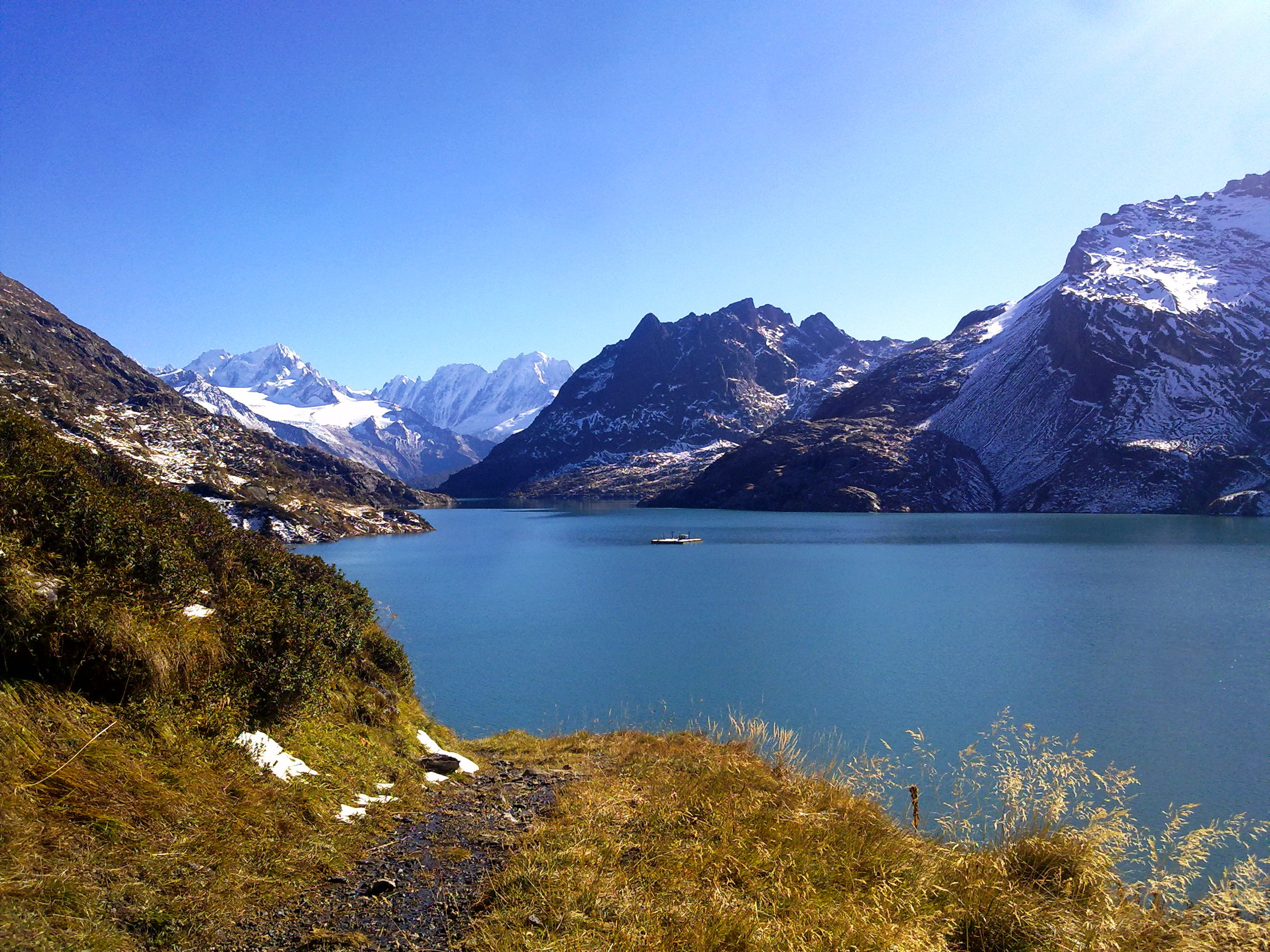
- Les Perrons (centre) from the Lac d'Emosson

Highest point
- Elevation: 2,674 m (8,773 ft)
- Prominence: 179 m (587 ft)
- Coordinates: 46°03′19″N 6°54′49″E

Geography
- Location within Alps
- Location: Valais, Switzerland; Haute-Savoie, France
- Parent range: Chablais Alps

Les Perrons (or Le Perron) is a mountain of the Chablais Alps, located on the border between Switzerland and France. The main summit (2,674 m) is named Grand Perron. It overlooks the Lac d'Emosson on its northern side.
