= Riederhorn =

Mountain in Switzerland

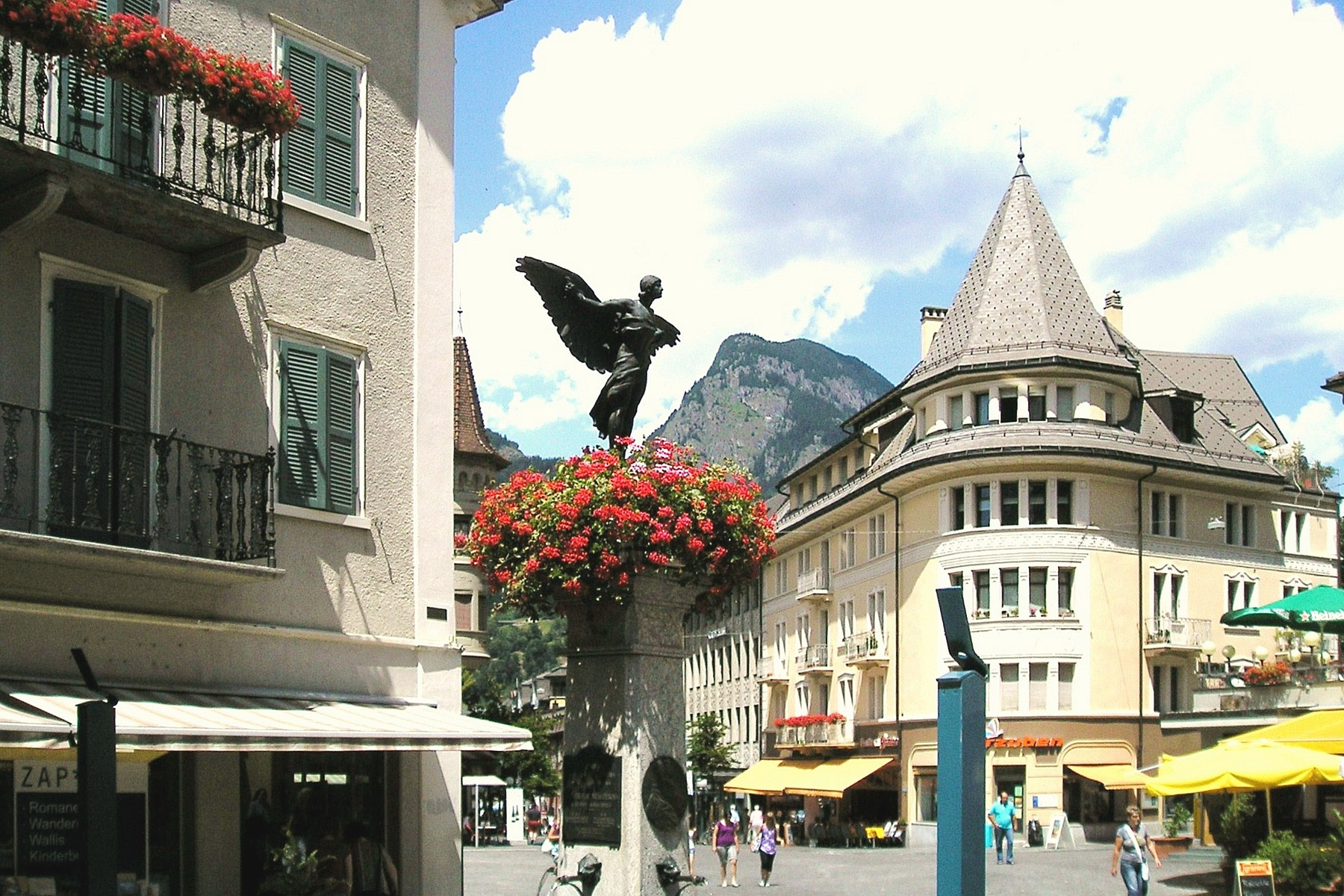
- The Riederhorn from Brig

Highest point
- Elevation: 2,230 m (7,320 ft)
- Prominence: 165 m (541 ft)
- Parent peak: Eggishorn
- Coordinates: 46°22′17″N 8°00′58″E

Geography
- Location within Switzerland
- Location: Valais, Switzerland
- Parent range: Bernese Alps

The Riederhorn (2,230 m) is a mountain overlooking Riederalp in the canton of Valais. It lies near the western end of the chain south of the Aletsch Glacier.
