= Pointe de Barasson =

Mountain in Switzerland

- Location within Alps

Highest point
- Elevation: 2,963 m (9,721 ft)
- Prominence: 205 m (673 ft)
- Coordinates: 45°51′46.8″N 7°12′2.9″E

Geography
- Location: Valais, Switzerland; Aosta Valley, Italy
- Parent range: Pennine Alps

The Pointe de Barasson is a mountain of the Swiss Pennine Alps, located on the border between Switzerland and Italy. It lies between the Great St Bernard Pass and Mont Vélan.
