= Steitalhorn =

Mountain in Switzerland

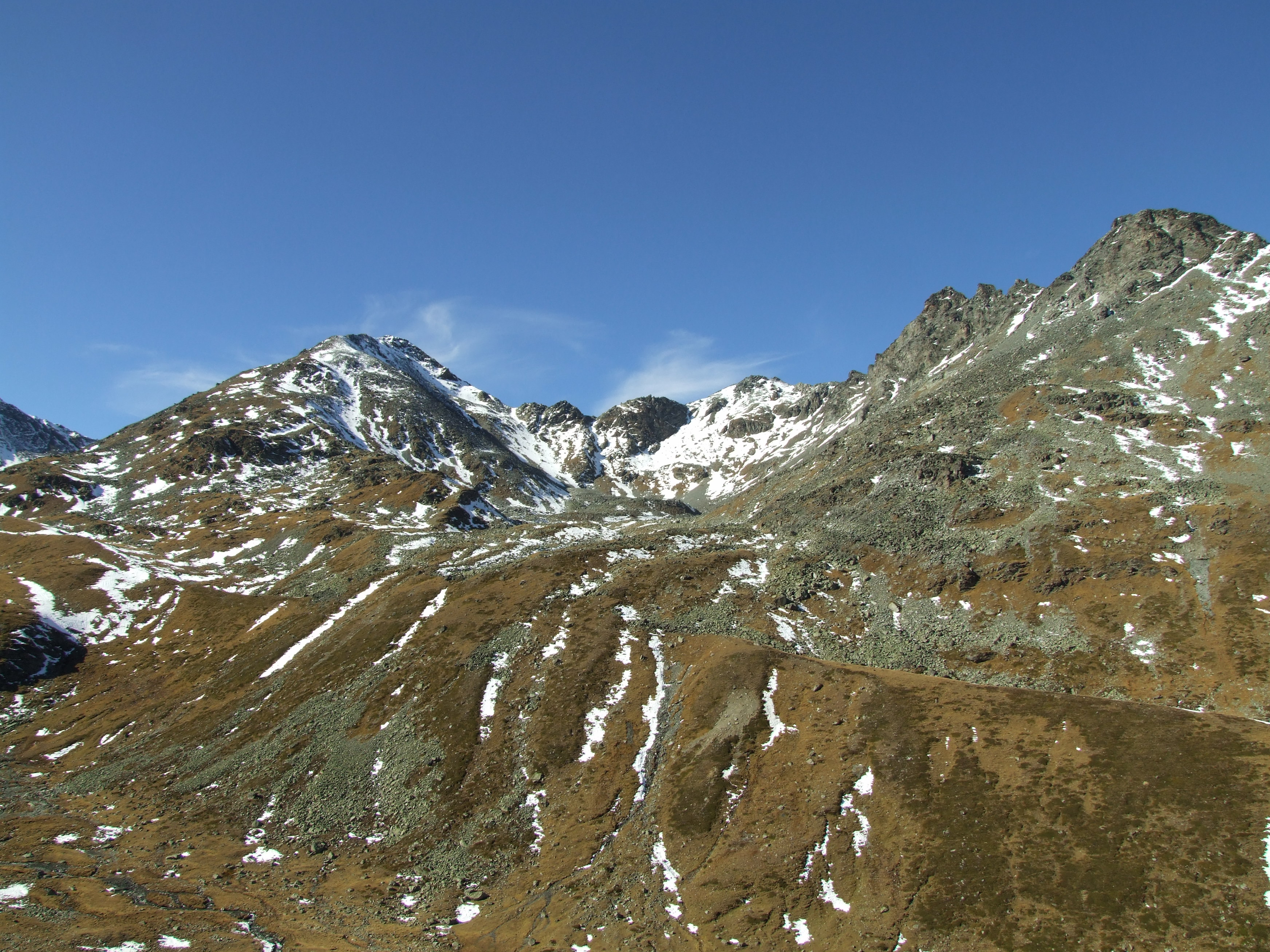
- Wyssegga (left) and Steitalhorn (right) from the Jungtal

Highest point
- Elevation: 3,164 m (10,381 ft)
- Prominence: 172 m (564 ft)
- Parent peak: Wyssegga
- Coordinates: 46°12′14″N 07°45′37″E

Geography
- Location within Switzerland
- Location: Valais, Switzerland
- Parent range: Pennine Alps

The Steitalhorn (3,164 m) is a mountain of the Pennine Alps, located west of Embd in the canton of Valais. It lies south of the Augstbord Pass, on the range between the Turtmanntal and the Mattertal, although its summit is within the Mattertal. The Steitalhorn is the culminating point of the group named Steitalgrat.
