= L'Ardève =

Mountain in Switzerland

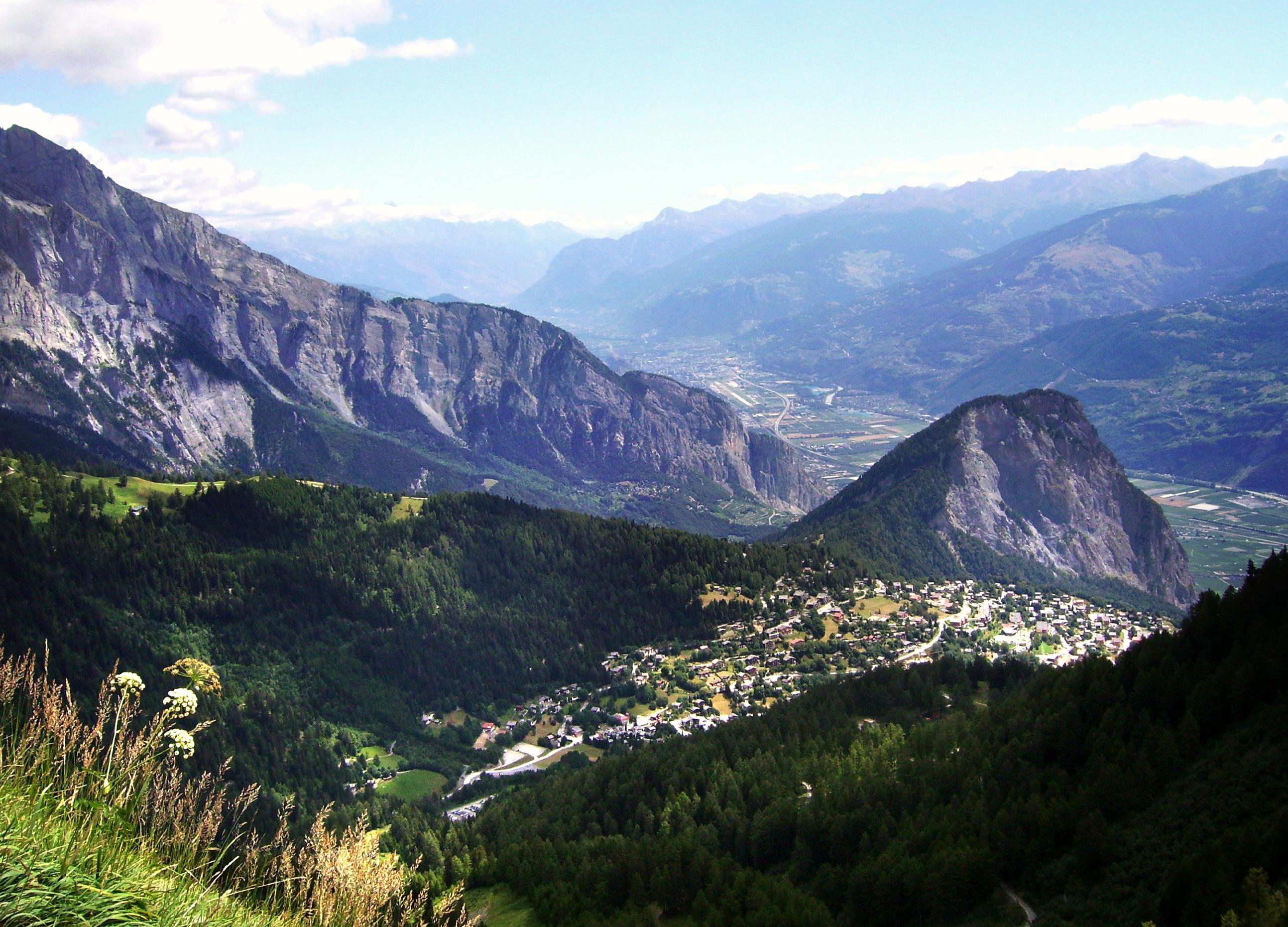
- L'Ardève (lower summit on the right) with Ovronnaz

Highest point
- Elevation: 1,501 m (4,925 ft)
- Prominence: 221 m (725 ft)
- Coordinates: 46°11′51″N 7°11′57″E

Geography
- Location within Switzerland
- Location: Valais, Switzerland
- Parent range: Bernese Alps

L'Ardève (1,501 m) is a mountain of the western Bernese Alps, overlooking the Rhone valley at Leytron, in the canton of Valais. It is elevated less than 200 metres above the nearby mountain resort of Ovronnaz, with high cliffs on its south side.
