= Mont de l'Arpille =

Mountain in Switzerland

- Location within Switzerland

Highest point
- Elevation: 2,085 m (6,841 ft)
- Prominence: 557 m (1,827 ft)
- Parent peak: Mont Blanc
- Coordinates: 46°4′38″N 7°0′24″E

Geography
- Location: Valais, Switzerland
- Parent range: Mont Blanc massif

Mont de l'Arpille is a mountain of the Alps, located south-west of Martigny in the Swiss canton of Valais. It is located north of the Col de la Forclaz and geographically part of the Mont Blanc massif.

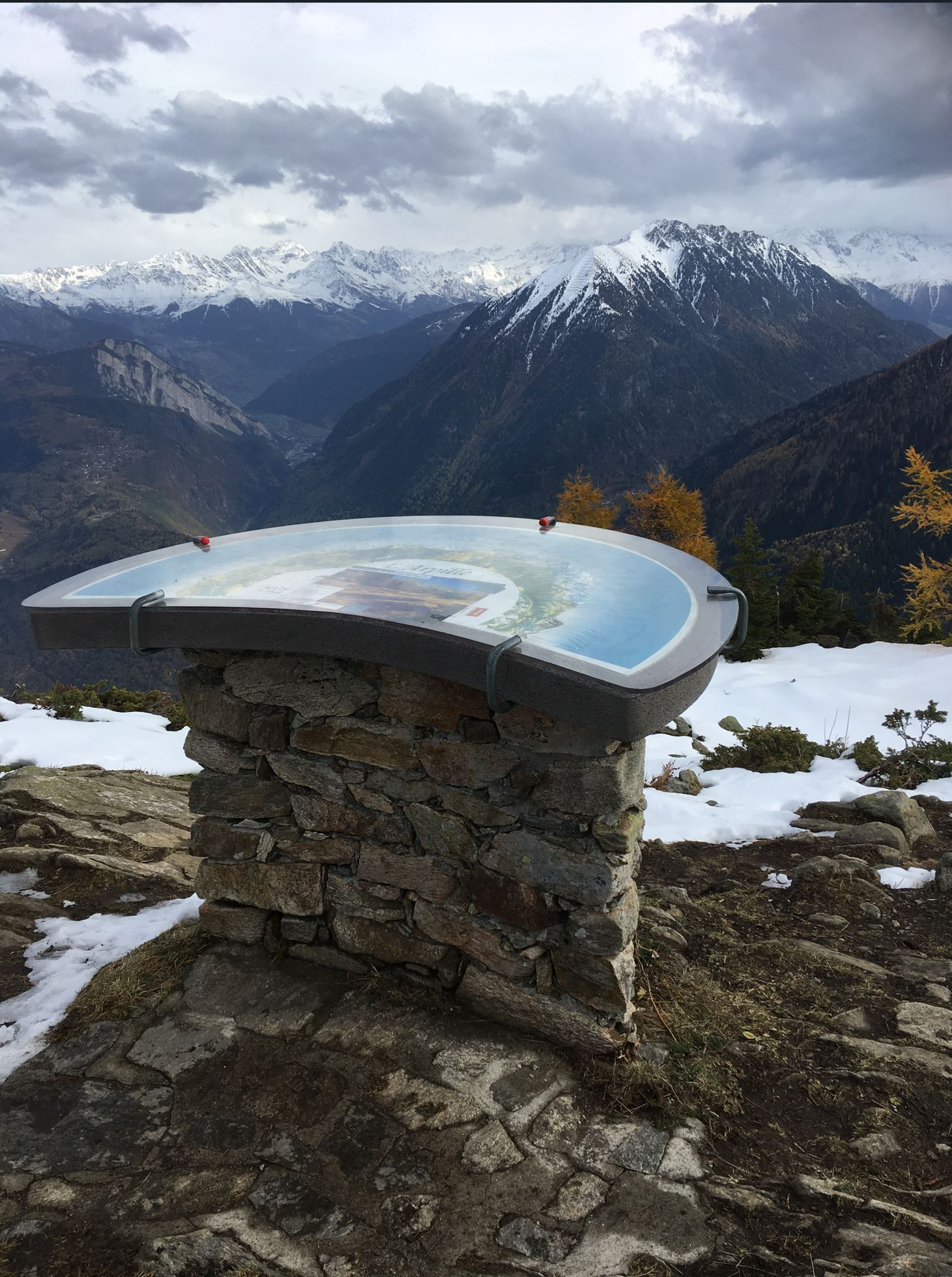
View from the summit of the Mont de l'Arpille
