= Furggubäumhorn =

Mountain in Switzerland

- Punta d'Aurona
- Location within Alps

Highest point
- Elevation: 2,985 m (9,793 ft)
- Prominence: 253 m (830 ft)
- Parent peak: Helsenhorn
- Coordinates: 46°16′47″N 8°06′20″E

Geography
- Location: Valais, Switzerland; Piedmont, Italy
- Parent range: Lepontine Alps

The Furggubäumhorn (also known as Punta d'Aurona) is a mountain of the Lepontine Alps, which is located on the main chain of the Alps, approximately halfway between the Wasenhorn and the Bortelhorn on the border between Switzerland and Italy.

On the north side of the mountain lies the Bortelsee.
