= Wyssegga =

Mountain in Switzerland

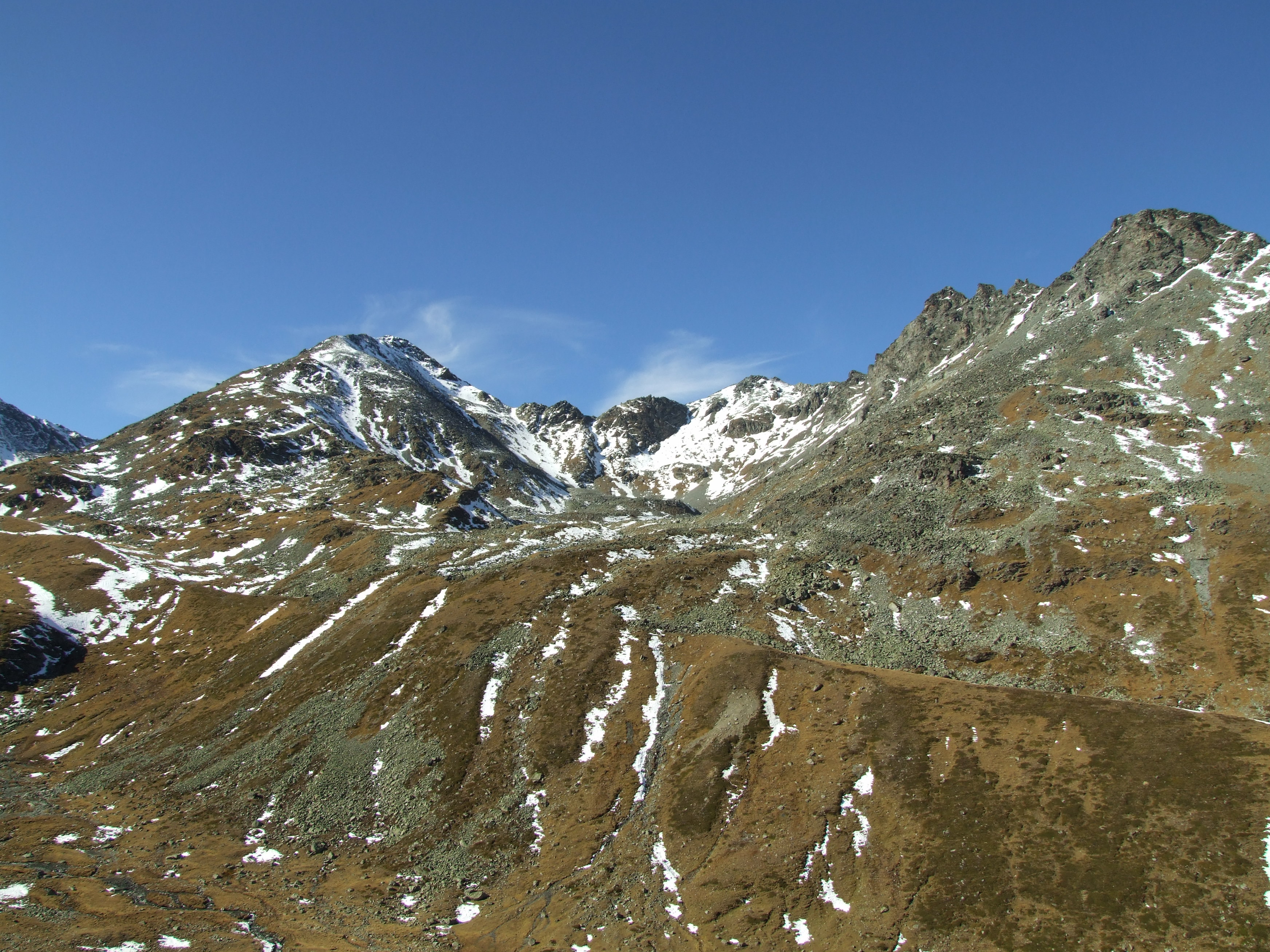
- Wyssegga (left) and Steitalhorn (right) from the Jungtal

Highest point
- Elevation: 3,168 m (10,394 ft)
- Prominence: 178 m (584 ft)
- Coordinates: 46°11′56″N 07°44′54″E

Geography
- Location within Switzerland
- Location: Valais, Switzerland
- Parent range: Pennine Alps

The Wyssegga is a mountain of the Swiss Pennine Alps, between the Turtmanntal and the Mattertal in the canton of Valais.

The closest locality is Gruben/Meiden on the west side.
