= Seehorn =

Mountain in Switzerland

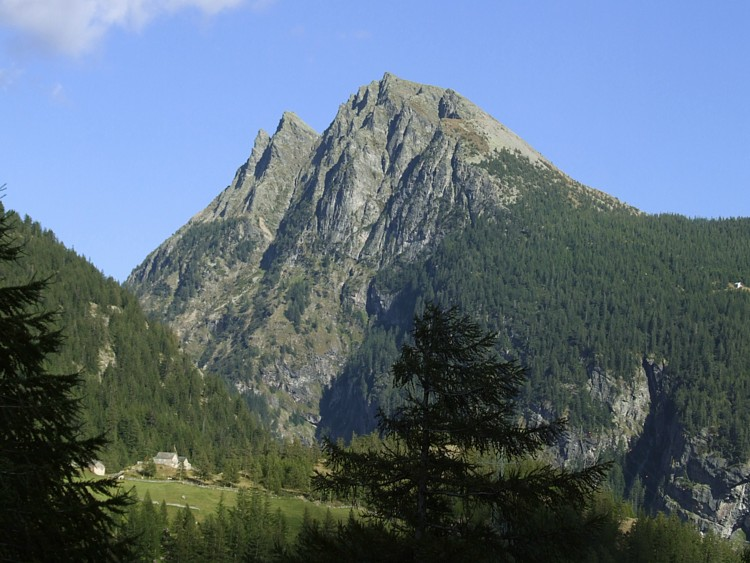
- The west-side

Highest point
- Elevation: 2,439 m (8,002 ft)
- Prominence: 567 m (1,860 ft)
- Coordinates: 46°10′56.6″N 8°6′55.8″E

Geography
- Location within Switzerland
- Location: Valais, Switzerland
- Parent range: Pennine Alps

The Seehorn (2,439 m) is a mountain of the Swiss Pennine Alps, overlooking Gondo in the canton of Valais. Unlike most other mountains in Valais, the Seehorn lies on the south side of the Alps, in the southern Simplon Valley.

From the Furggu-pass (1,872m) a trail leads to its summit.
