= Galehorn =

Mountain in Switzerland

- Galenhorn
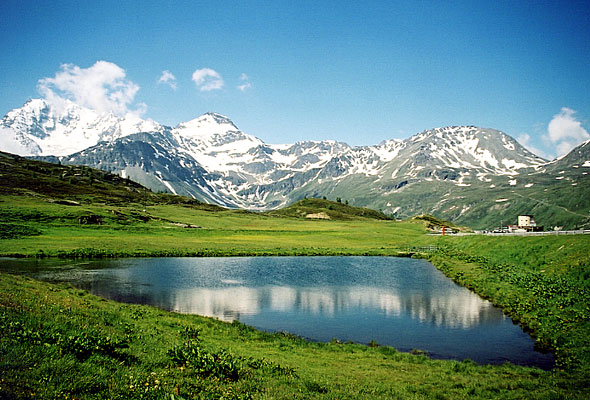
- The Galehorn (right) from the Simplon Pass

Highest point
- Elevation: 2,797 m (9,177 ft)
- Prominence: 176 m (577 ft)
- Coordinates: 46°13′18.2″N 7°58′59.3″E

Geography
- Location within Switzerland
- Location: Valais, Switzerland
- Parent range: Pennine Alps

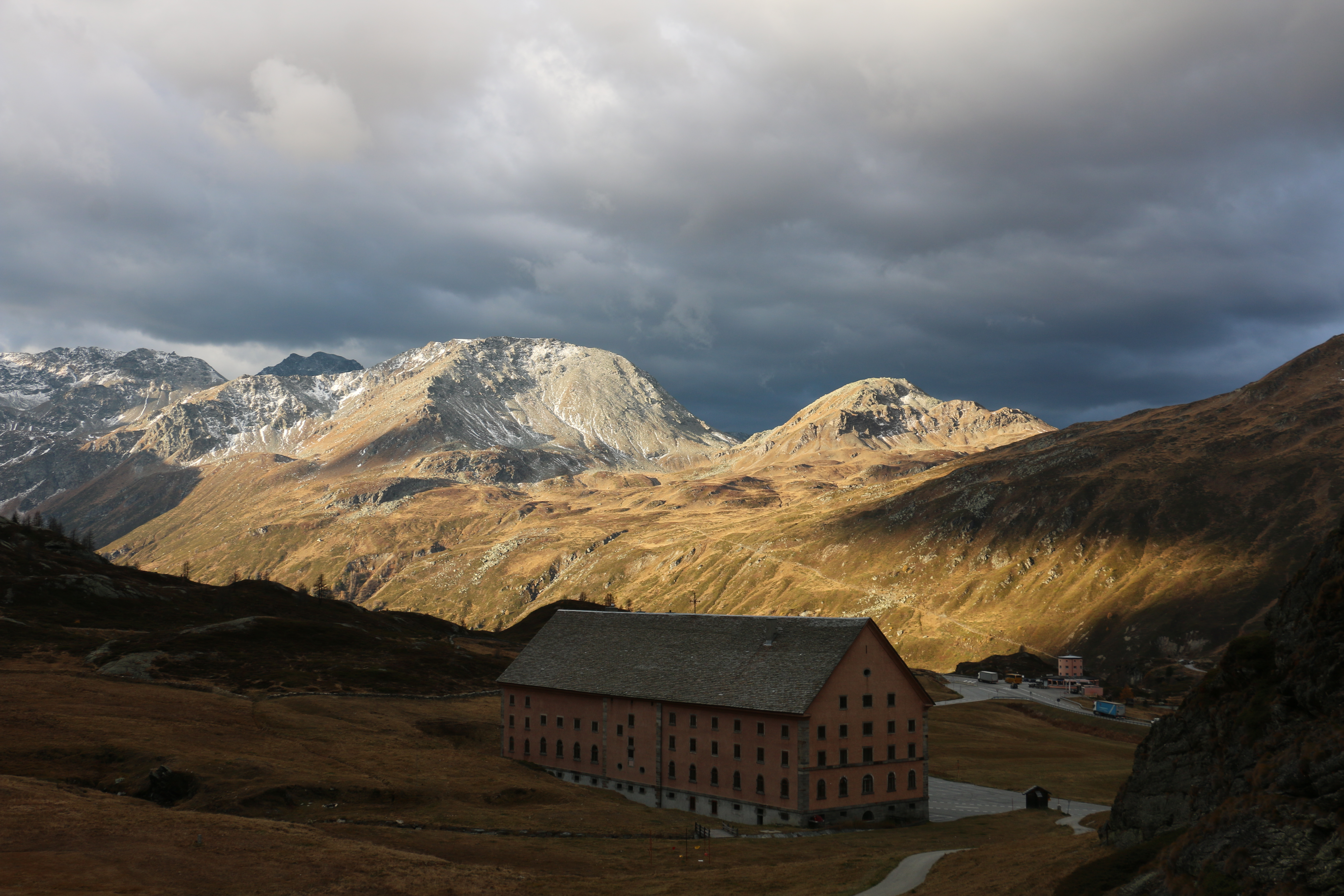
Galehorn (left) and Magehorn (right) (2017)

The Galehorn (or Galenhorn) is a mountain of the Swiss Pennine Alps, located between the Nanztal and the Simplontal.
