= Grand Golliat =

Mountain in Switzerland

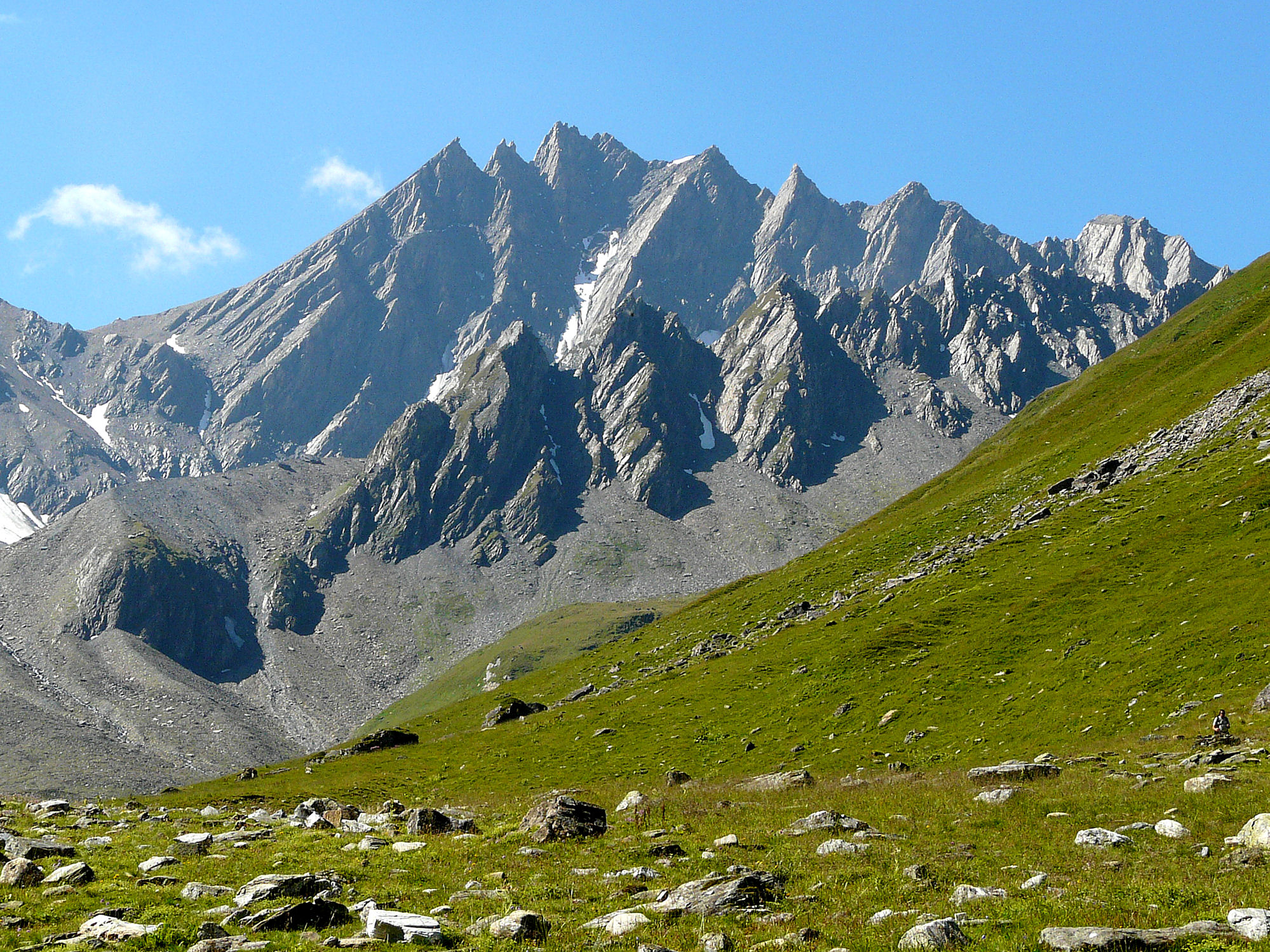
- The north side

Highest point
- Elevation: 3,238 m (10,623 ft)
- Prominence: 368 m (1,207 ft)
- Parent peak: Grande Rochère
- Isolation: 5.8 km (3.6 mi)
- Listing: Alpine mountains above 3000 m
- Coordinates: 45°51′33.3″N 7°06′04.3″E

Geography
- Location within Alps
- Location: Aosta Valley, Italy; Valais, Switzerland
- Parent range: Pennine Alps

The Grand Golliat (also spelled Grand Golliaz) is a mountain of the Pennine Alps, located between the Petit Col Ferret and the Great St. Bernard Pass. At 3,238 metres above sea level, its summit straddles the border between Switzerland and Italy, separating the Swiss canton of Valais from the Italian region of Aosta Valley. The name Golliat comes from "gouilles" or small lakes located on the Italian side of the mountain.

The Grand Golliat is the southernmost mountain rising above 3,000 metres in Switzerland.
