= La Tsavre =

Mountain in Switzerland

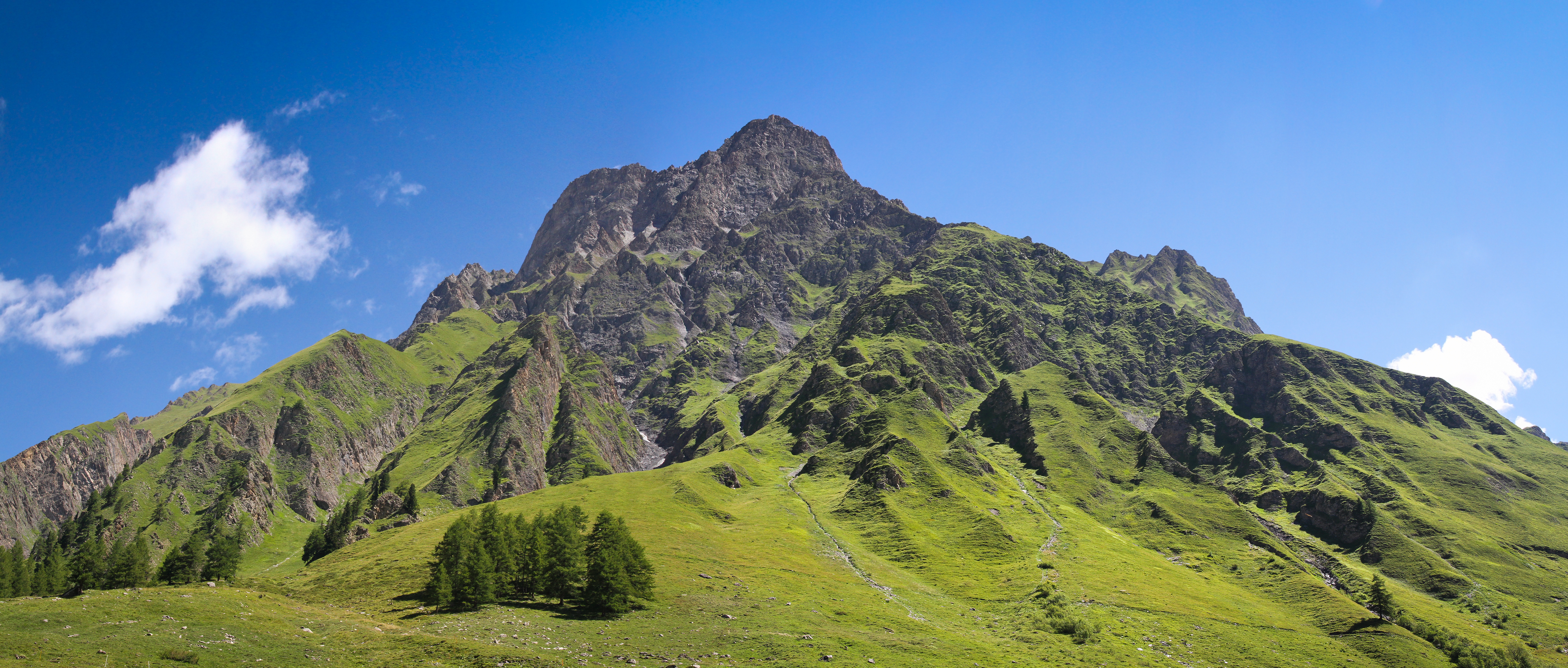
- La Tsavre

Highest point
- Elevation: 2,978 m (9,770 ft)
- Prominence: 305 m (1,001 ft)
- Parent peak: Grand Rochère
- Coordinates: 45°54′55.3″N 7°7′46.4″E

Geography
- Location within Switzerland
- Location: Valais, Switzerland
- Parent range: Pennine Alps

La Tsavre (also known as Mont Ferret) is a mountain of the Swiss Pennine Alps, overlooking Ferret in the canton of Valais. With a height of 2,978 metres above sea level, it is the highest summit of the Combe de l'A, a small valley between the Val Ferret and the Val d'Entremont.
