= La Crevasse =

Mountain in Switzerland

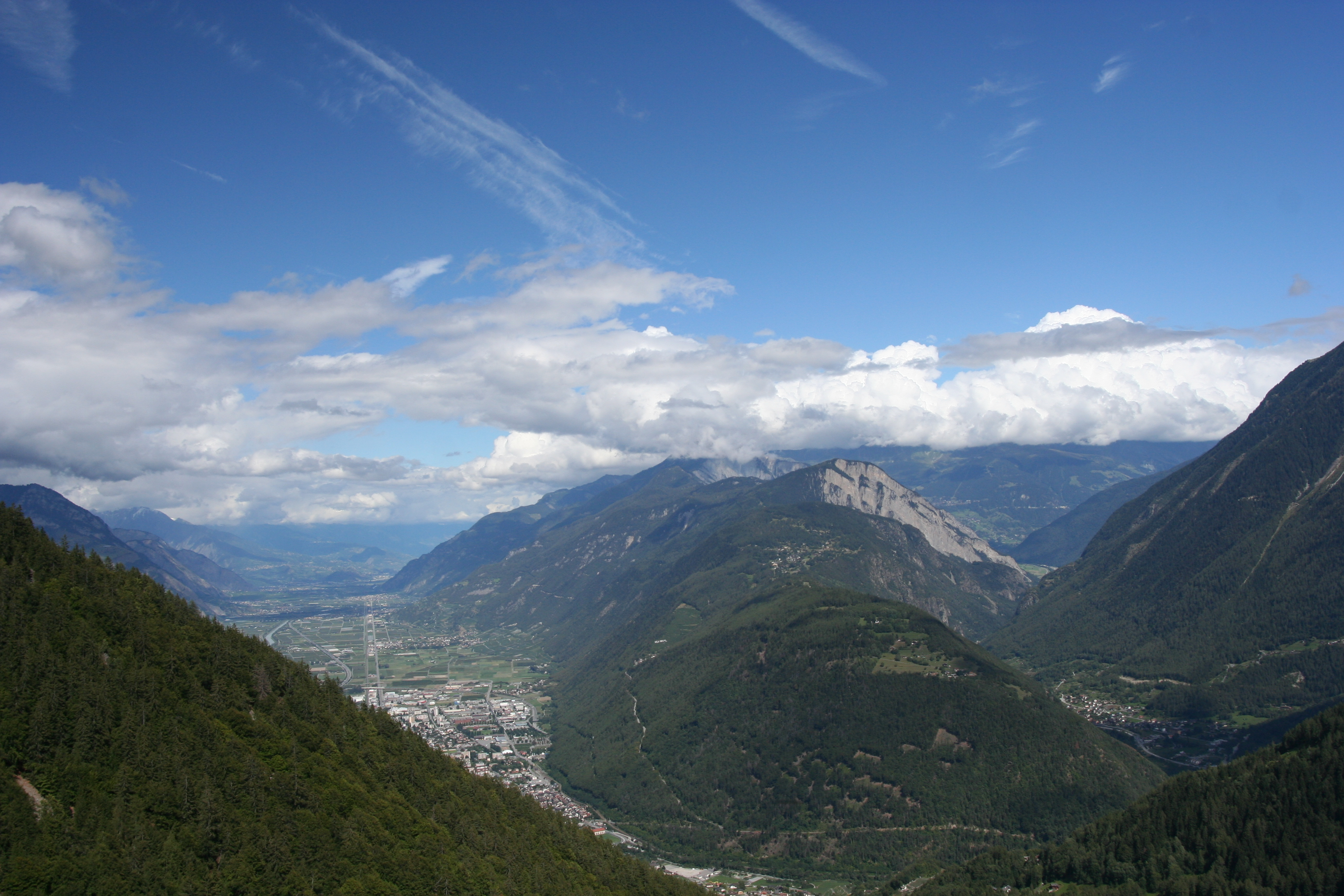
- La Crevasse (centre-right) from the west

Highest point
- Elevation: 1,808 m (5,932 ft)
- Prominence: 202 m (663 ft)
- Coordinates: 46°05′34″N 07°08′12″E

Geography
- Location within Switzerland
- Location: Valais, Switzerland
- Parent range: Pennine Alps

Climbing
- Easiest route: Trail

La Crevasse is a mountain of the Pennine Alps, overlooking Sembrancher in the canton of Valais. It lies just east of the Col des Planches.

The mountain is mostly wooded, except for its southwestern side, which consists of almost vertical cliffs.
