= Pointe de Bellevue =

Mountain in Switzerland

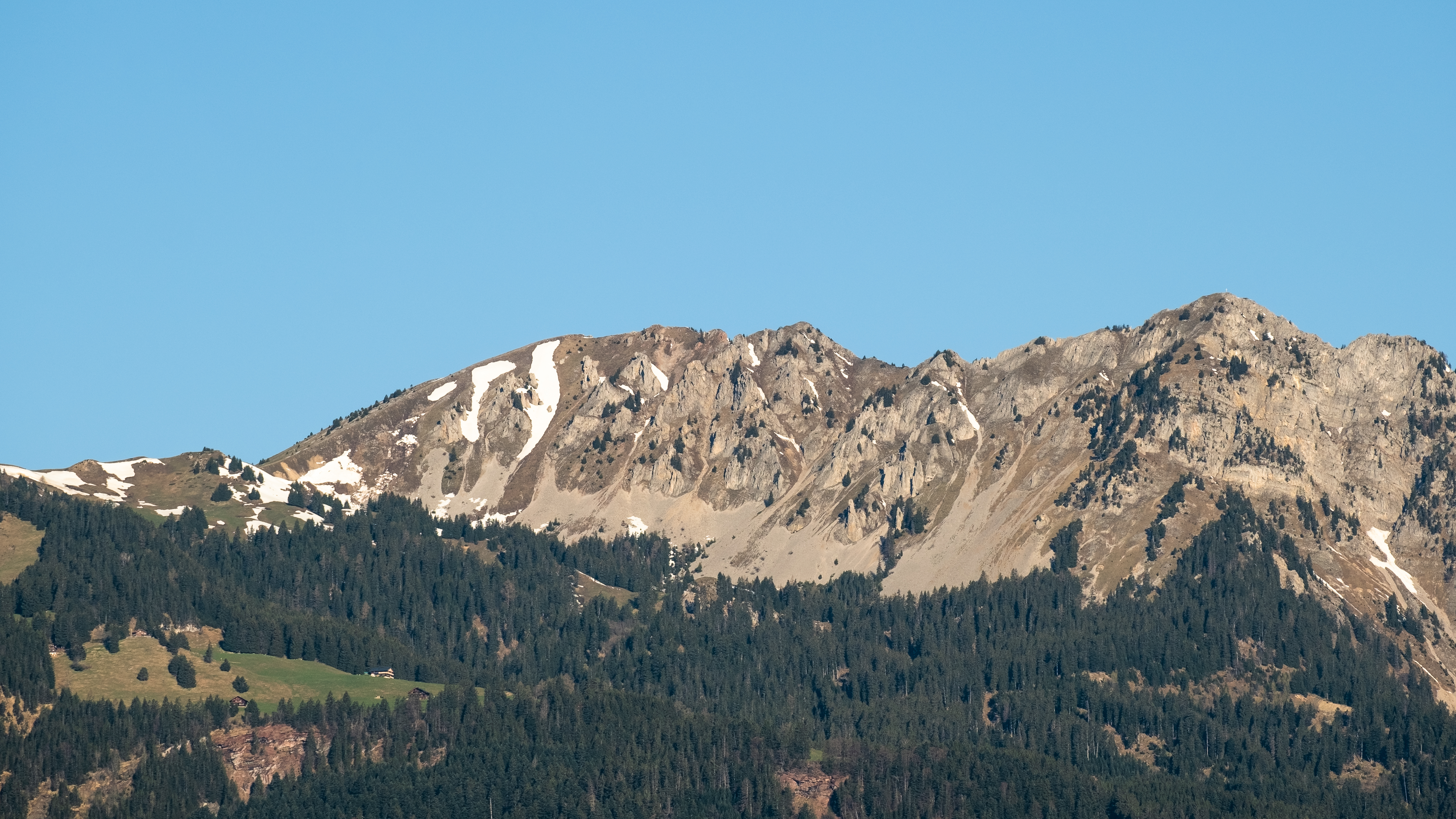
- Pointe de Bellevue (left) from Bex

Highest point
- Elevation: 2,042 m (6,699 ft)
- Prominence: 355 m (1,165 ft)
- Parent peak: Cornettes de Bise
- Coordinates: 46°15′27″N 6°53′15″E

Geography
- Location within Switzerland
- Main peaks in Chablais Alps Mouse over (or touch) gives more detail of peaks. Location of Pointe de Bellevue
- Location: Switzerland
- Parent range: Chablais Alps

The Pointe de Bellevue (French pronunciation: [pwɛ̃t də bɛlvy]) is a mountain in the Chablais Alps, overlooking Monthey in Valais. It is located in the northern foothills, which are separated from the Dents du Midi by the Val d'Illiez and Pas de Morgins

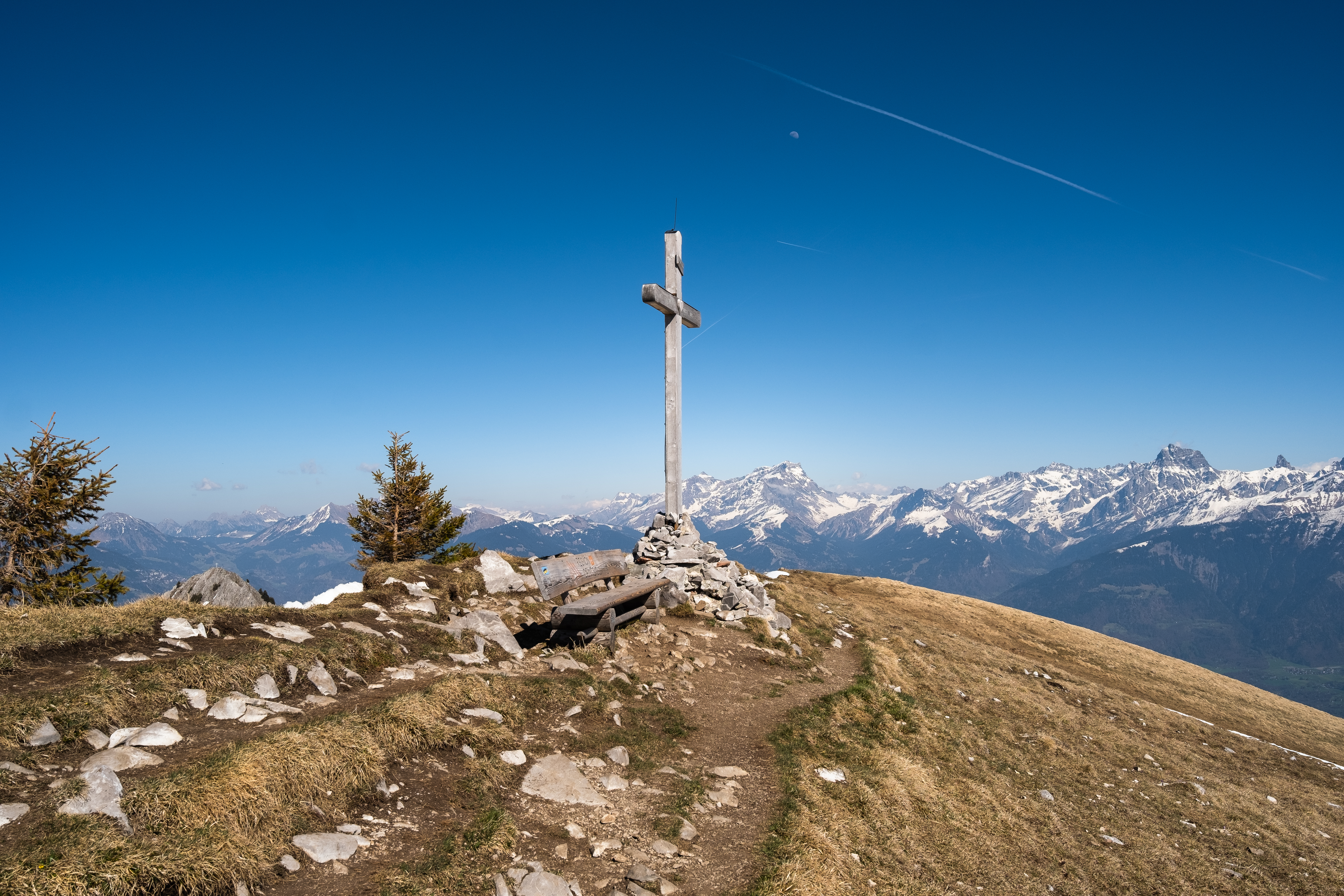
Top of the Point de Bellevue
