= Haut de Cry =

Mountain in Switzerland

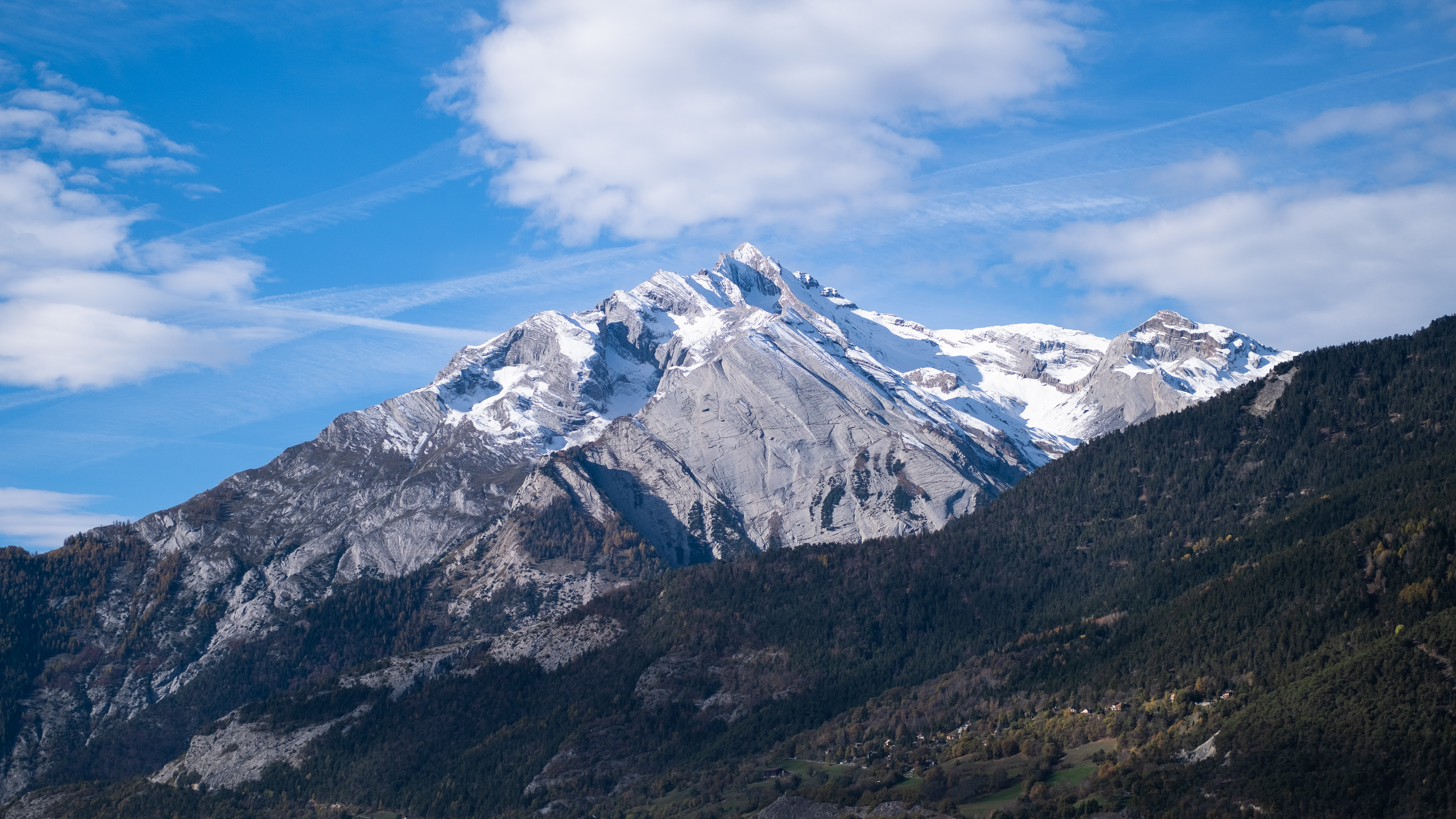
- Haut de Cry from the Soie Castle

Highest point
- Elevation: 2,969 m (9,741 ft)
- Prominence: 515 m (1,690 ft)
- Parent peak: Grand Muveran
- Coordinates: 46°14′25″N 7°11′42″E

Geography
- Location within Switzerland
- Location: Valais, Switzerland
- Parent range: Bernese Alps

The Haut de Cry is a mountain of the Bernese Alps, overlooking the Rhône Valley in the canton of Valais. It is composed of several summits, of which the highest has an elevation of 2,969 metres above sea level. The entire mountain lies within the basin of the Rhône, which flows approximately seven kilometres to the south.

The nearest localities are Derborence and Ardon, on the east side of the Haut de Cry.
