= Augstbordhorn =

Mountain in Switzerland

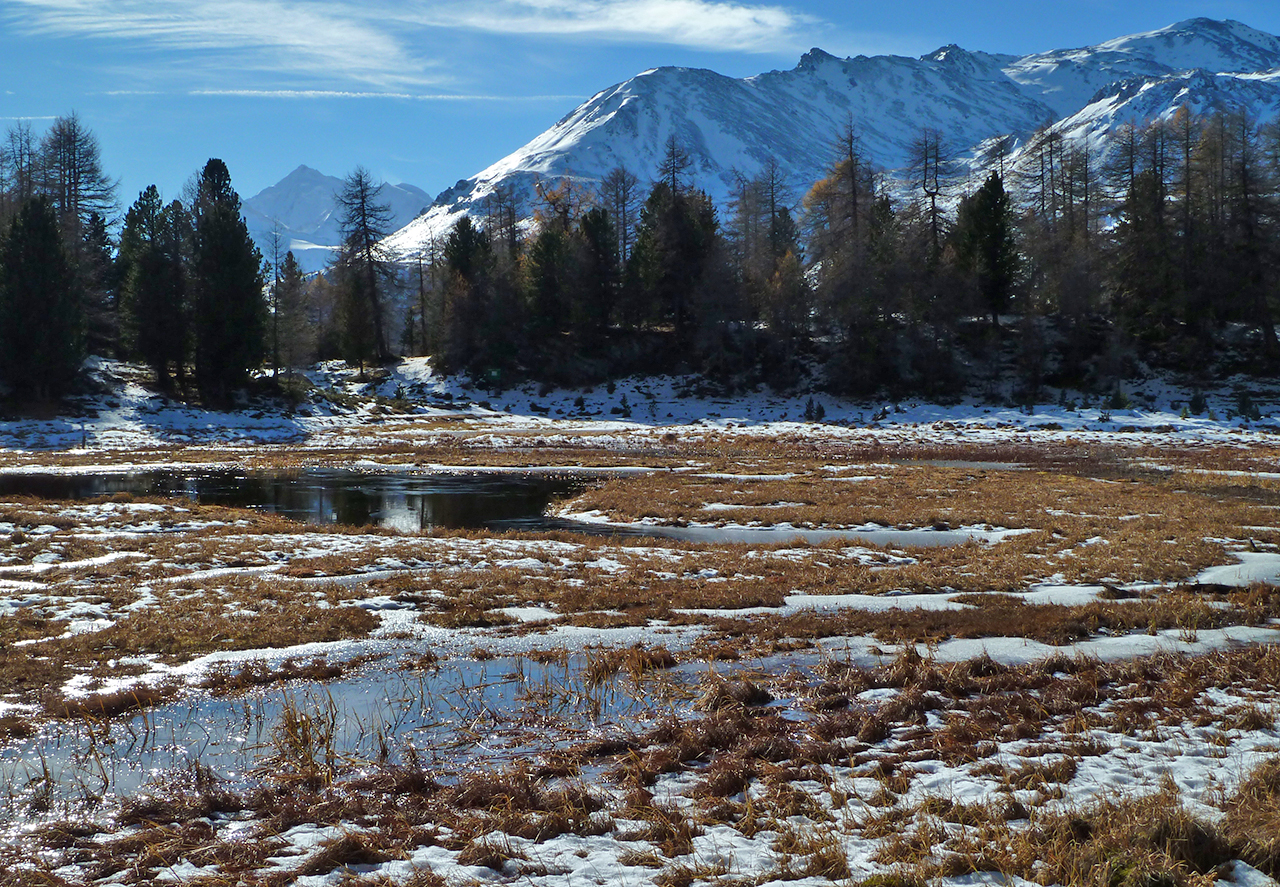

Highest point
- Elevation: 2,971 m (9,747 ft)
- Prominence: 168 m (551 ft)
- Parent peak: Monte Rosa
- Coordinates: 46°14′6.3″N 7°47′43″E

Geography
- Location within Switzerland
- Location: Valais, Switzerland
- Parent range: Pennine Alps

The Augstbordhorn is a mountain of the Pennine Alps, overlooking Törbel in the canton of Valais. Several trails lead to its summit.
