= Stockhorn (Binntal) =

Mountain in Switzerland

- Location within Switzerland

Highest point
- Elevation: 2,610 m (8,560 ft)
- Prominence: 258 m (846 ft)
- Coordinates: 46°20′45″N 08°12′51″E

Geography
- Location: Valais, Switzerland
- Parent range: Lepontine Alps

The Stockhorn (2,610 m) is a mountain of the Lepontine Alps, overlooking Binn in the canton of Valais. It lies north of the Scherbadung massif.
