= Cornettes de Bise =

Mountain in Switzerland

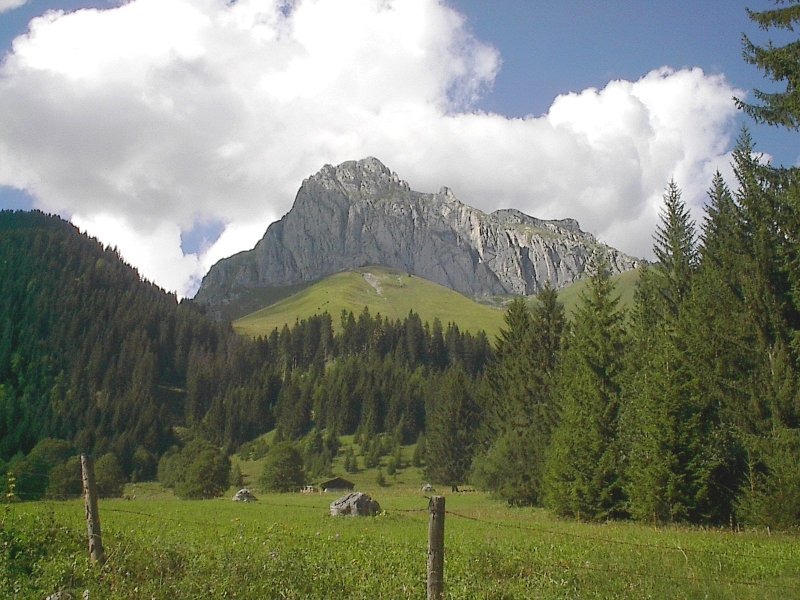
- View from Chevenne (south)

Highest point
- Elevation: 2,432 m (7,979 ft)
- Prominence: 1,063 m (3,488 ft)
- Parent peak: Mont Blanc
- Isolation: 18.2 km (11.3 mi)
- Coordinates: 46°19′57″N 6°47′04″E

Geography
- Location within Alps
- Main peaks in Chablais Alps Mouse over (or touch) gives more detail of peaks. Location of Cornettes de Bise
- Location: Valais, Switzerland; Haute-Savoie, France
- Parent range: Chablais Alps

The Cornettes de Bise (French pronunciation: [kɔʁnɛt də biz]) is a mountain in the Chablais Alps, overlooking Lake Geneva. At 2,432 metres (7,979 feet) above sea level, it is the highest summit of the subrange running from Pas de Morgins to Lake Geneva. The mountain is located on the border between France (west) and Switzerland (east).

Nearest localities are Miex (Valais) and La Chapelle-d'Abondance (Haute Savoie). Various trails lead to the summit from both sides.

== Panorama ==
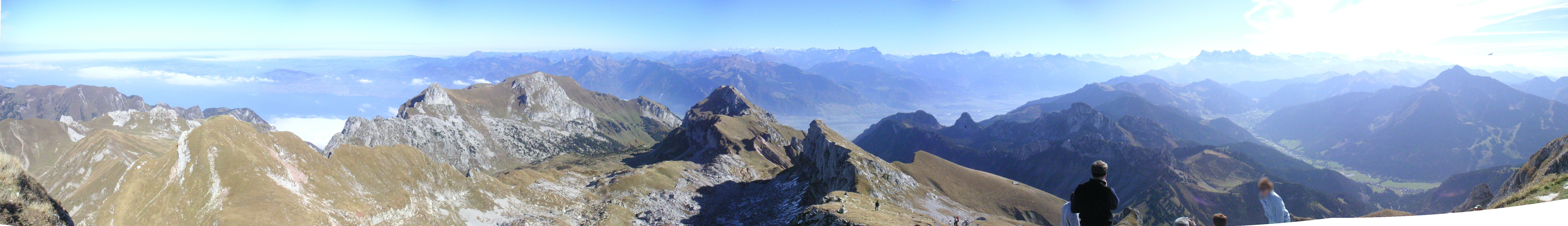
View from the summit

== See also ==
- List of mountains of Valais
- List of most isolated mountains of Switzerland
