= Le Génépi =

Mountain of the Swiss Mont Blanc massif

- Location within Switzerland

Highest point
- Elevation: 2,884 m (9,462 ft)
- Prominence: 219 m (719 ft)
- Parent peak: Mont Blanc
- Coordinates: 46°01′29″N 7°02′39″E

Geography
- Location: Valais, Switzerland
- Parent range: Mont Blanc Massif

Le Génépi (2,884 m) is a mountain of the Swiss Mont Blanc massif, located west of Champex in the canton of Valais. It is the culminating point of the group lying north of the Fenêtre d'Arpette.
