= Pointe de Chésery =

Mountain in Switzerland

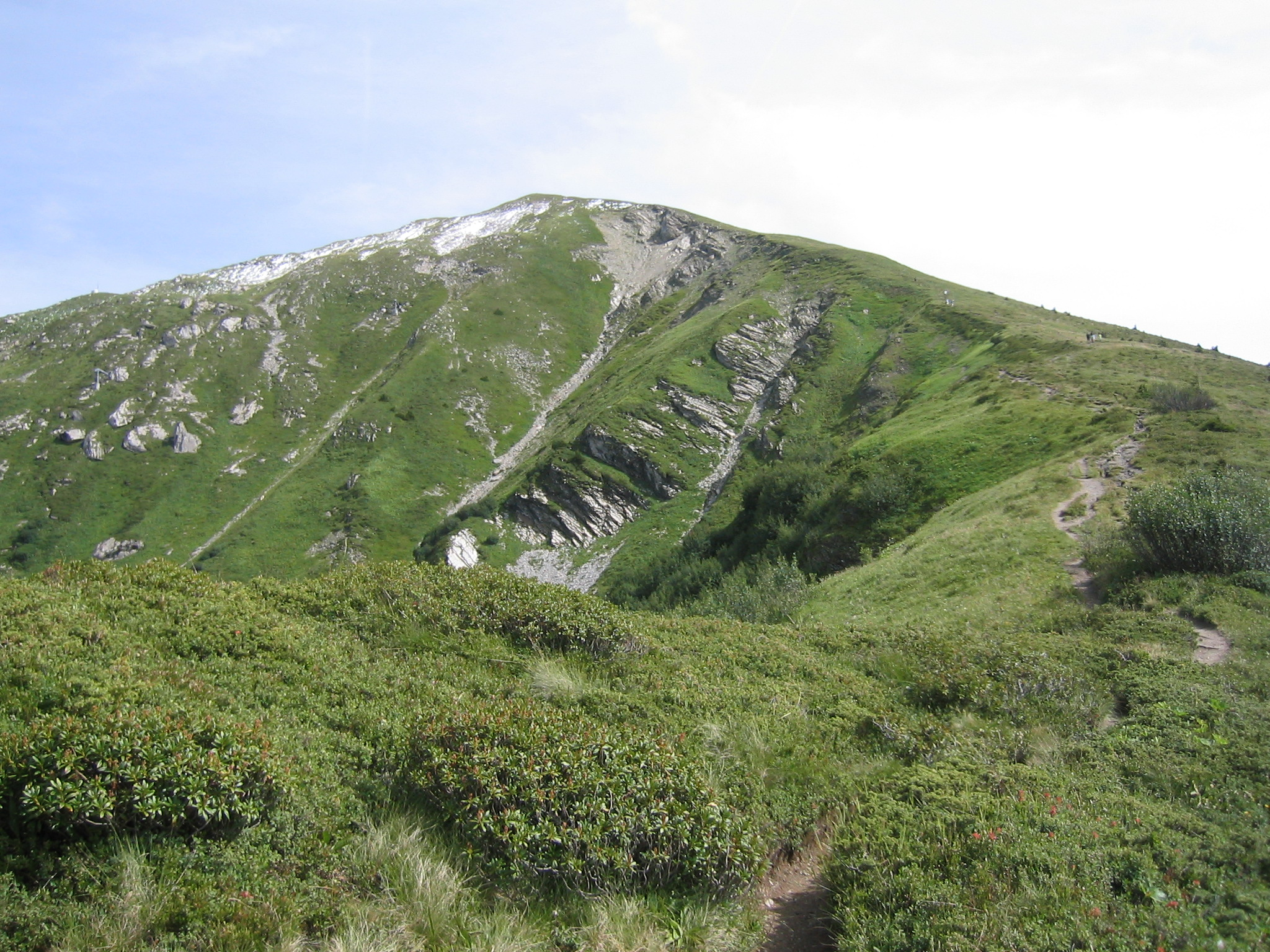

Highest point
- Elevation: 2,249 m (7,379 ft)
- Prominence: 254 m (833 ft)
- Parent peak: Hauts-Forts
- Coordinates: 46°12′13″N 6°48′12″E

Geography
- Location within Alps
- Location: Valais, Switzerland; Haute-Savoie, France
- Parent range: Chablais Alps

The Pointe de Chésery is a mountain in the Chablais Alps on the Swiss-French border.
