= Pizzo Gallina =

Mountain in Switzerland

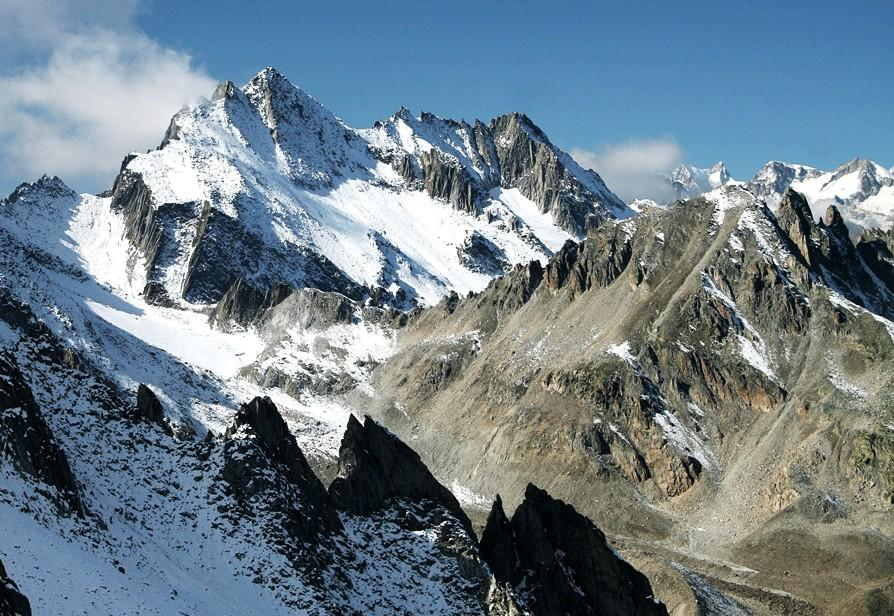
- The north-west side of Pizzo Gallina

Highest point
- Elevation: 3,061 m (10,043 ft)
- Prominence: 378 m (1,240 ft)
- Parent peak: Pizzo Rotondo
- Listing: Alpine mountains above 3000 m
- Coordinates: 46°29′41.6″N 8°23′31.7″E

Geography
- Location within Switzerland
- Location: Valais/Ticino, Switzerland
- Parent range: Lepontine Alps

Pizzo Gallina is a 3,061-metre-high (10,043 ft) mountain in the Lepontine Alps of Switzerland, overlooking the Nufenen Pass.

Administratively, the summit is located on the border between the municipality of Obergoms, to the north-west and in the canton of Valais, and the municipality of Bedretto, to the south-east and in the canton of Ticino.
