= Grande Rochère =

Mountain in Italy

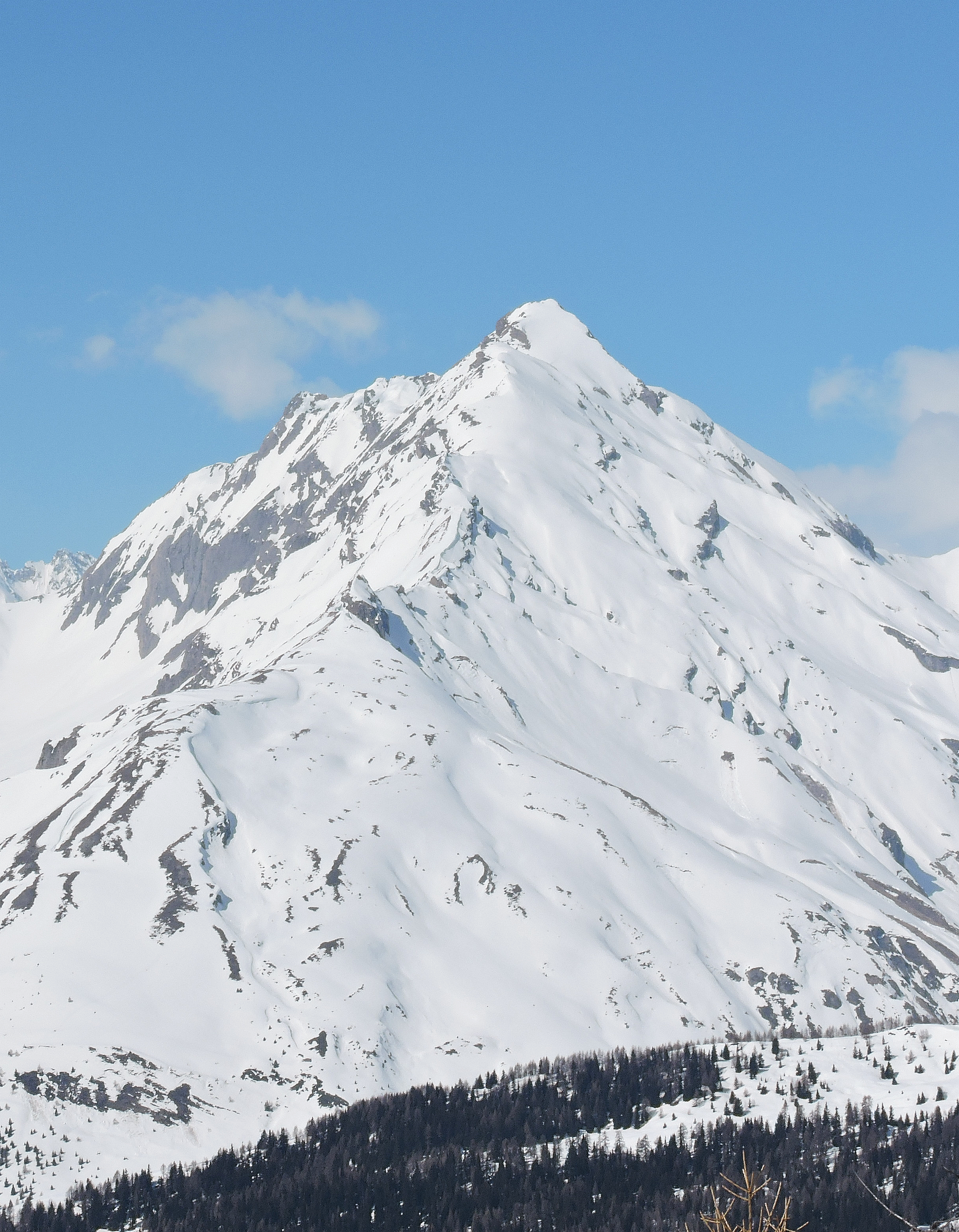
- Winter view from Court de Bard

Highest point
- Elevation: 3,328 m (10,919 ft)
- Prominence: 836 m (2,743 ft)
- Parent peak: Mont Blanc
- Listing: Alpine mountains above 3000 m
- Coordinates: 45°48′49″N 7°3′41″E

Geography
- Location within Alps
- Location: Aosta Valley, Italy
- Parent range: Pennine Alps

The Grande Rochère is a mountain of the Italian Pennine Alps, located north of Morgex in the Aosta Valley. Reaching a height of 3,326 metres above sea level, it is the culminating point of the group lying between the Col Ferret and the Great St. Bernard Pass.
