= Lac de Morgins =

Lake in Valais, Switzerland

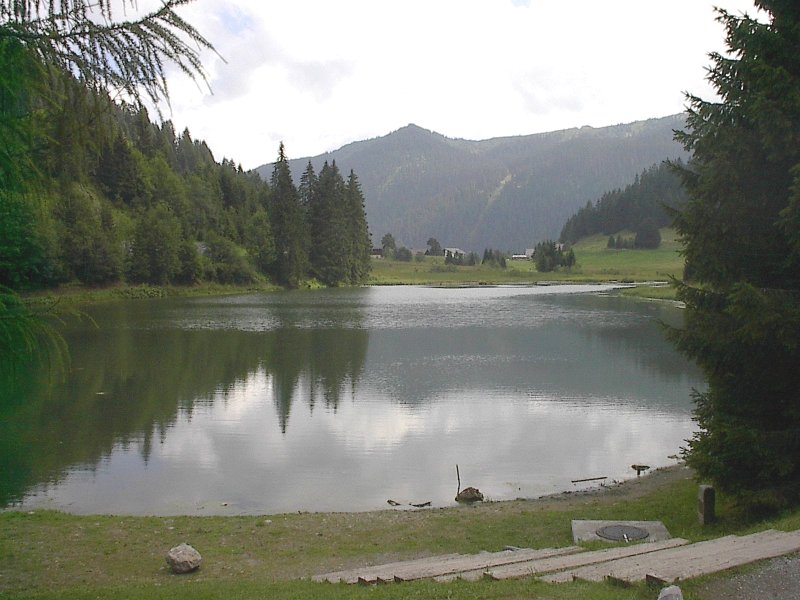

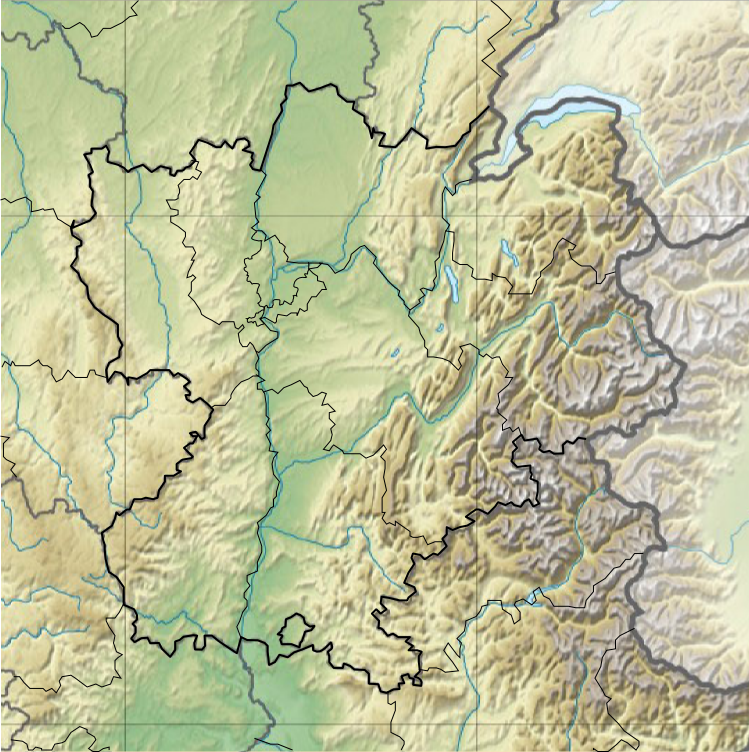
- Location within Canton of Valais Location within Rhône-Alpes Location within Switzerland Location within France Location within Alps
- Interactive map of Lac de Morgins
- Location: Valais
- Coordinates: 46°14′55″N 6°50′48″E
- Basin countries: Switzerland
- Surface elevation: 1,366 m (4,482 ft)

Lac de Morgins is a lake in Valais, Switzerland. It is located at Morgins (municipality of Troistorrents), near the Pas de Morgins, the pass into France.

It was classified as a protected site in 1978. It is one of the largest spawning grounds for amphibians in Valais. Two tunnels constructed in 2004/2005 and three tunnels constructed in 2015 leading to the lake allow amphibians to avoid crossing the Pas de Morgins and reduced amphibian roadkill numbers.
