= Morgins =

Swiss village

Coordinates: 46.2382°N 6.8519°E

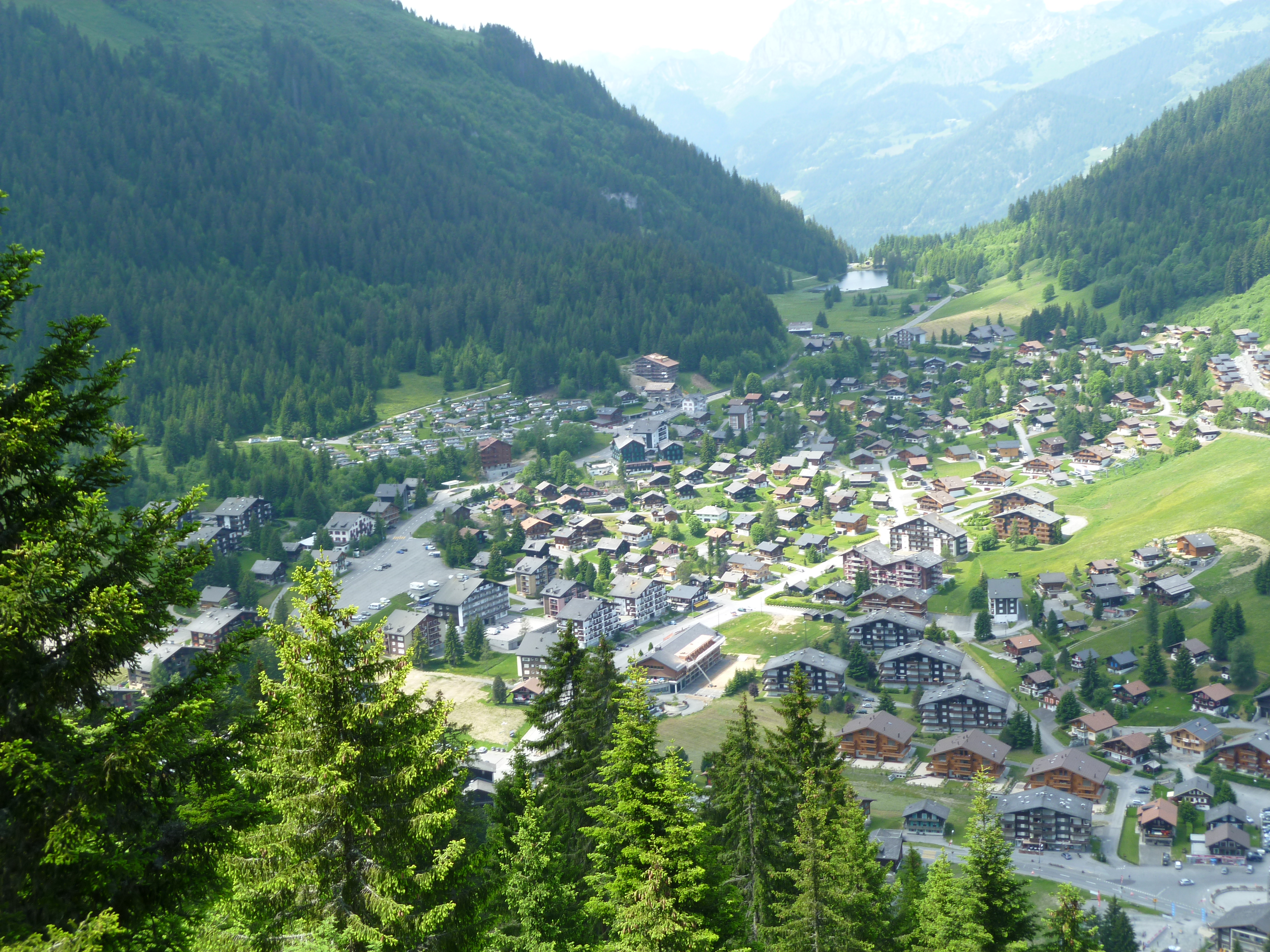
View of Morgins

Morgins is a village in the municipality of Troistorrents in the district of Monthey in the canton of Valais in southern Switzerland.

It is noted for skiing and is part of the Portes du Soleil ski resort. It is located at 1333 m in the Val de Morgins, a side valley of the Val d'Illiez in the Chablais Alps at the foot of the Dents du Midi.

The road up the Val de Morgins leads to the Pas de Morgins, the pass into France.

Aerial view (1964)
