= Luisin =

Mountain in Switzerland

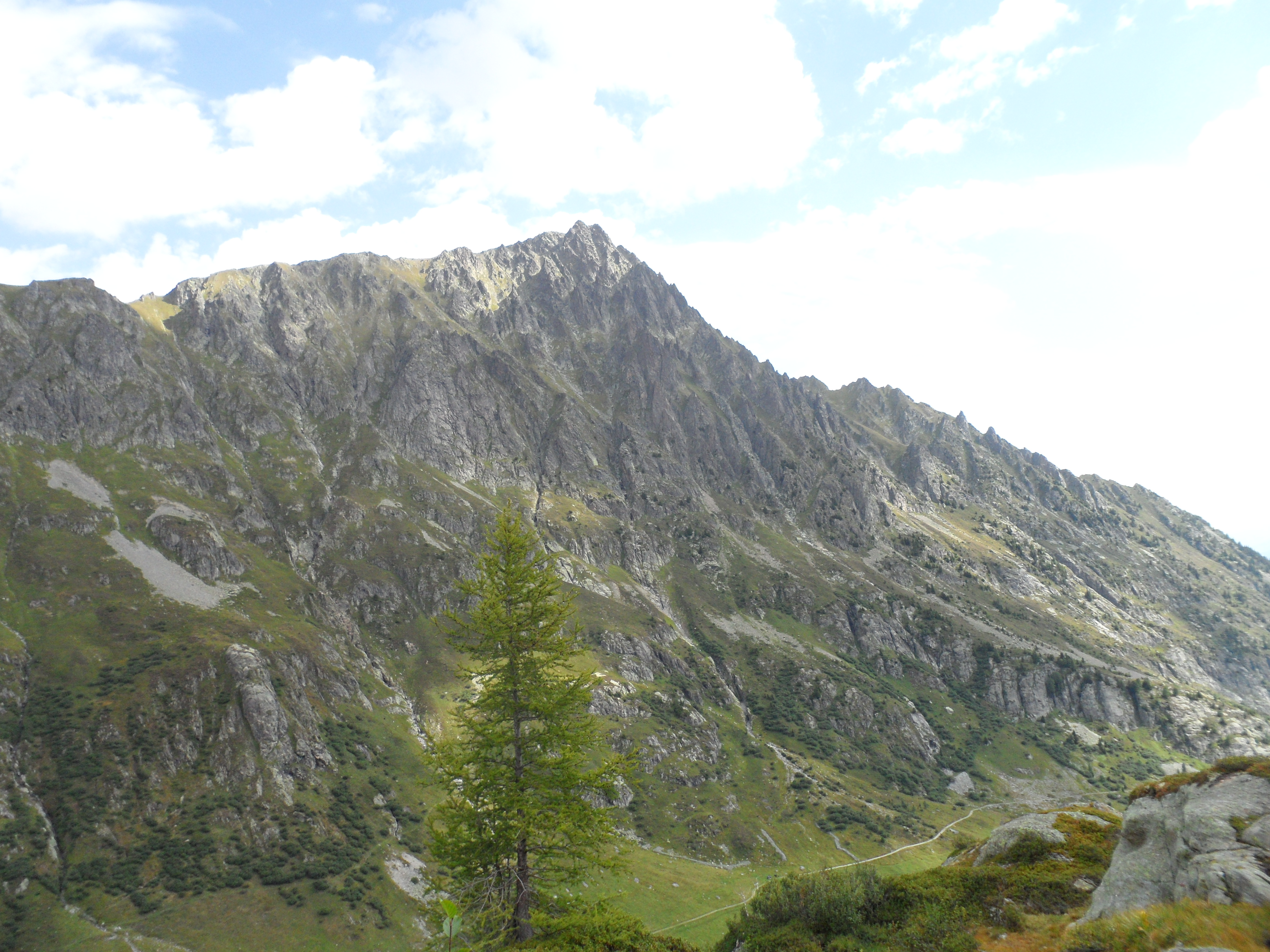
- The south face seen from the Emaney valley

Highest point
- Elevation: 2,786 m (9,140 ft)
- Prominence: 324 m (1,063 ft)
- Parent peak: Dents du Midi
- Coordinates: 46°07′15″N 6°58′12″E

Geography
- Location within Switzerland
- Main peaks in Chablais Alps Mouse over (or touch) gives more detail of peaks. Location in Switzerland
- Location: Valais, Switzerland
- Parent range: Chablais Alps

Climbing
- Easiest route: Hiking

The Luisin (French pronunciation: [lɥizɛ̃]) is a mountain of the Chablais Alps, overlooking Les Marécottes in the canton of Valais. It lies east of the Tour Sallière, on the range between the lake of Salanfe and the valley of Trient.
