= Pas de Morgins =

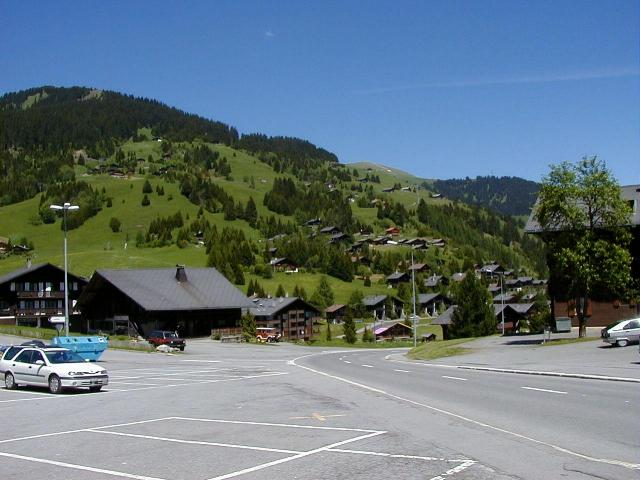
- Pas de Morgins

- Location within Alps
- Elevation: 1,369 m (4,491 ft)
- Traversed by: Road

Third Approach
- Location: Valais, Switzerland; Haute-Savoie, France
- Range: Alps
- Coordinates: 46°14′59″N 06°50′45″E

Pas de Morgins (el. 1369 m.) is a high mountain pass in the Alps between the canton of Valais in Switzerland and France. It is located at the top of the Val de Morgins, which turns off the Val d'Illiez at Troistorrents.

The road through the Val de Morgins is marked by a series of hairpin curves.

It connects Monthey and Abondance.

Two amphibian tunnels constructed in 2004/2005 and three tunnels constructed in 2015 leading to the nearby Lac de Morgins allow amphibians to avoid crossing the Pas de Morgins and reduced amphibian roadkill numbers.

== Tour de France ==
Pas de Morgins has been used a total of eight times since its debut in the 1977 Tour de France. Seven times the climb was categorized and once the climb was uncategorized.

Year	Stage	Category	Start	Finish	Leader at the summit
2022	9	1	Aigle	Châtel Les Portes du Soleil	Bob Jungels (LUX)
1997	16	3	Morzine	Fribourg	Frank Vandenbroucke (BEL)
1988	11	1	Besançon	Morzine	Ludo Peeters (BEL)
1985	11	1	Pontarlier	Morzine-Avoriaz	Luis Herrera (COL)
1984	20	3	Morzine	Crans-Montana	Theo de Rooij (NED)
1978	18	3	Morzine	Lausanne	Mariano Martínez (FRA)
1977	15a	3	Thonon-les-Bains	Morzine	Paul Wellens (BEL)

== See also ==
- List of highest paved roads in Europe
- List of mountain passes
- List of the highest Swiss passes
