= Mont Ruan =

Mountain in Switzerland

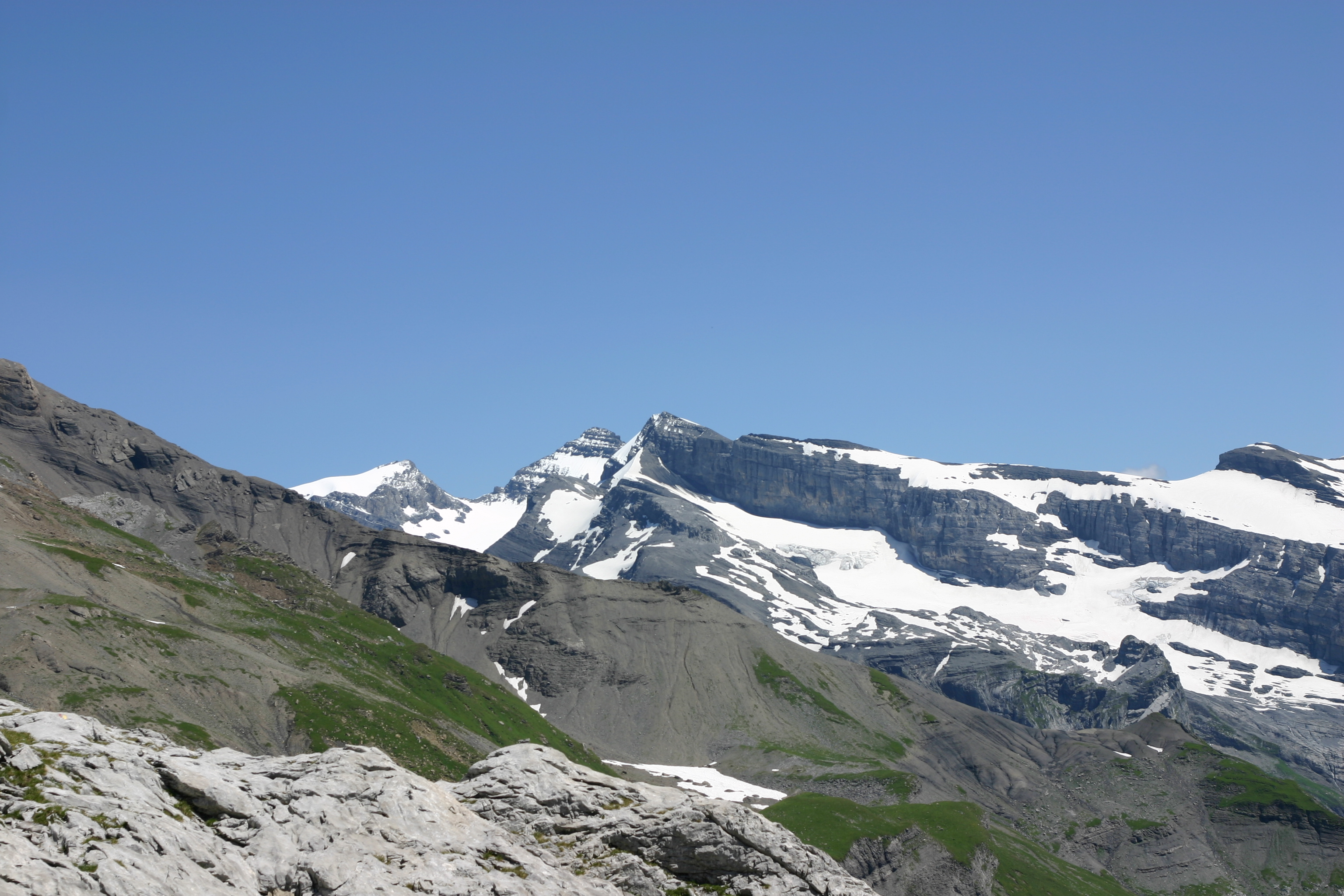

Highest point
- Elevation: 3,057 m (10,030 ft)
- Prominence: 227 m (745 ft)
- Parent peak: Tour Sallière
- Coordinates: 46°07′27″N 6°54′10″E

Geography
- Location within Switzerland
- Main peaks in Chablais Alps Mouse over (or touch) gives more detail of peaks. Location in Switzerland
- Location: Valais, Switzerland (mountain partially in France)
- Parent range: Chablais Alps

Mont Ruan (or Grand Mont Ruan) is a mountain in the Chablais Alps, overlooking the lake of Emosson in the Swiss canton of Valais. At 3,057 metres (10,030 feet) above sea level, its main summit is located 200 metres (660 feet) away from the French border, where lies a slightly lower summit at 3,044 metres (9,987 feet).

Mont Ruan is the westernmost mountain rising above 3,000 metres (9,800 feet). in Switzerland.
