= Pointe de l'Au =

Mountain in Switzerland

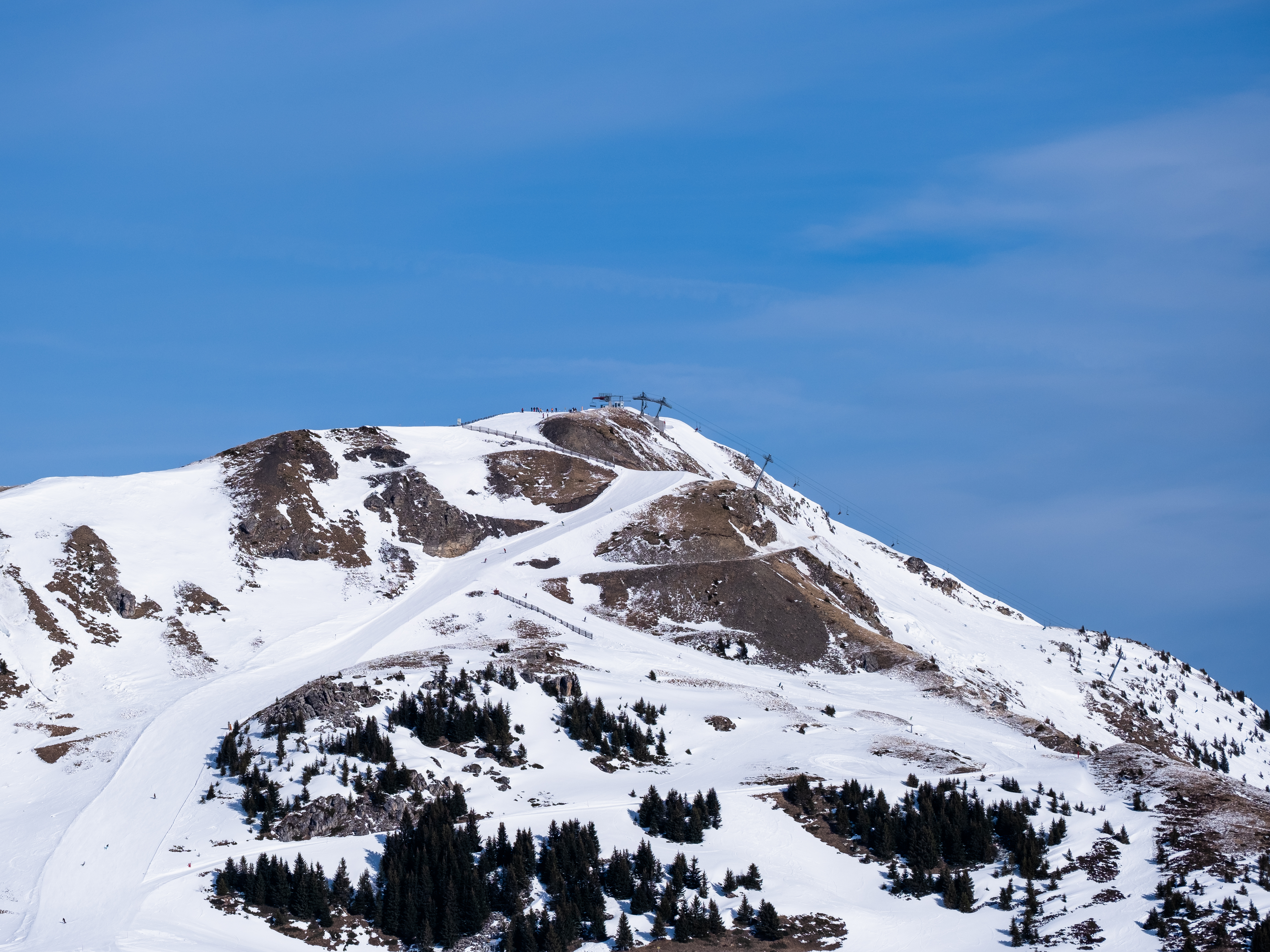
- The Pointe de l'Au as seen from Marcheusson

Highest point
- Elevation: 2,152 m (7,060 ft)
- Prominence: 202 m (663 ft)
- Parent peak: Hauts-Forts
- Coordinates: 46°12′01″N 6°50′28″E

Geography
- Location within Switzerland
- Main peaks in Chablais Alps Mouse over (or touch) gives more detail of peaks. Location in Switzerland
- Location: Valais, Switzerland
- Parent range: Chablais Alps

The Pointe de l'Au (French pronunciation: [pwɛ̃t də lo]) is a mountain in the Swiss Chablais Alps, situated to the north of Champéry in the canton of Valais.
