= Mont de Grange =

Mountain in Haute-Savoie, France

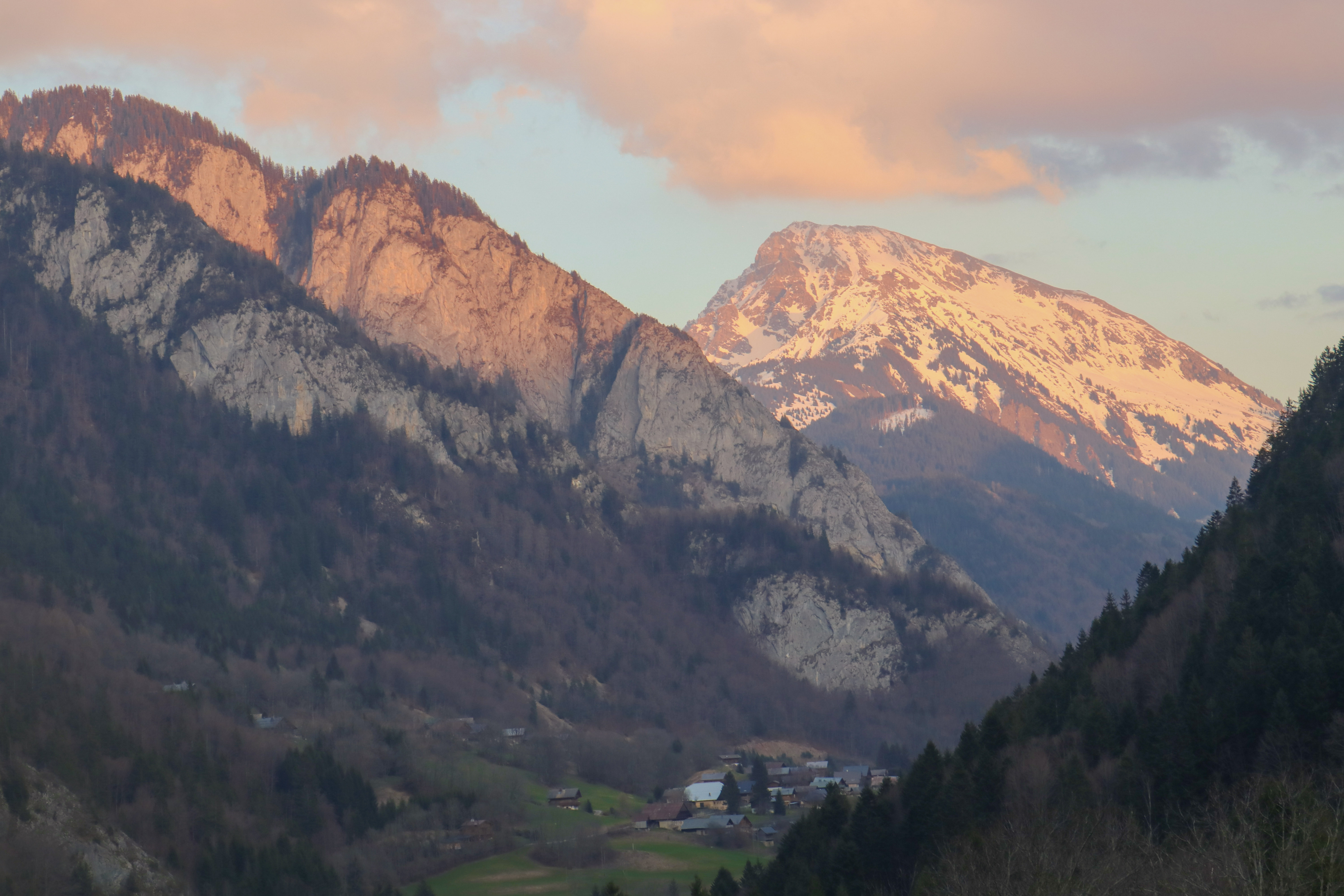

Highest point
- Elevation: 2,432 m (7,979 ft)
- Prominence: 768 m (2,520 ft)
- Coordinates: 46°15′45″N 06°46′50″E

Geography
- Location within Alps
- Location: Haute-Savoie, France
- Parent range: Chablais Alps

Mont de Grange (French pronunciation: [mɔ̃ də ɡʁɑ̃ʒ]; 2,432 m) is a mountain of the Chablais Alps in Haute-Savoie, France.
