= Mont Buet =

Mountain in Chablais Alps

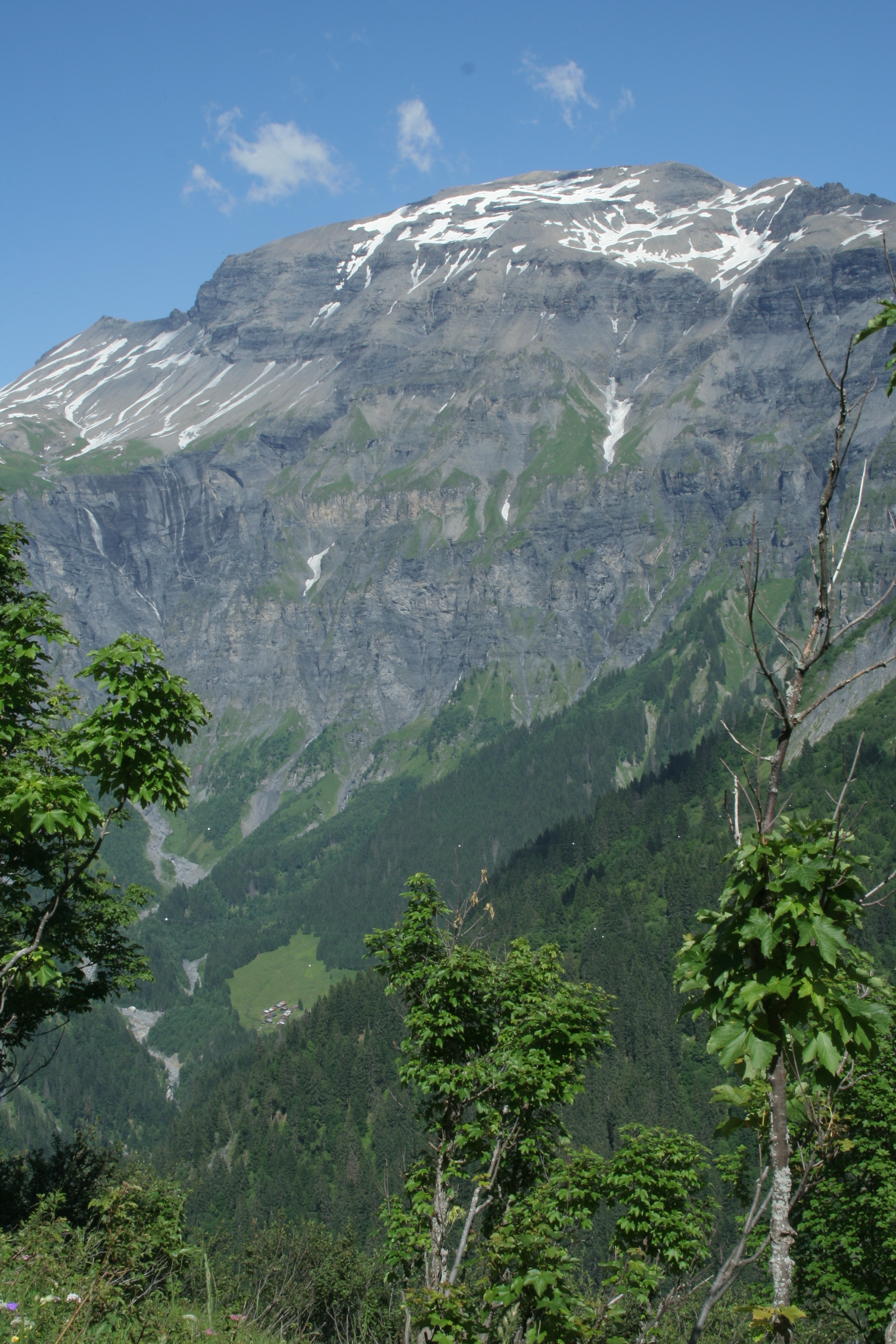

Highest point
- Elevation: 3,096 m (10,157 ft)
- Prominence: 602 m (1,975 ft)
- Parent peak: Dents du Midi
- Listing: Alpine mountains above 3000 m
- Coordinates: 46°01′30″N 06°51′09″E

Geography
- Location within France
- Location of Mont Buet France
- Location: Haute-Savoie, France
- Parent range: Chablais Alps

Climbing
- First ascent: 25 September 1770 by Jean-André Deluc
- Easiest route: The mountain is easily climbed from the Chamonix valley. There is a chalet en route, which sells refreshments during the summer months. The main obstacles are a boulder field and a short ice field. Carrying an ice axe is recommended here in case of a slip, although I found crampons unnecessary. The top is likely to be snow-covered, even in summer, but one is rewarded by a splendid view of Mt. Blanc just across the valley, and of the Alps of Haute Savoie.

The Mont Buet (French pronunciation: [mɔ̃ bɥɛ]; 3,096 m) is a mountain of the Chablais Alps in Haute-Savoie, France. Mont Buet has played an important role in the history of science at the end of the eighteenth century when a series of Genevan scientists such as Jean-André Deluc, Horace Bénédict de Saussure or Marc-Auguste Pictet climbed to the summit to carry out scientific observations. Before the first successful ascents on the Mont Blanc in 1786, Mont Buet was "the highest among those accessible in this area" of the Alps. Mont Buet remains a popular destination especially because of the exceptional view on Mont Blanc, and the panoramic view from the summit.

== History ==
The first known attempt at ascending on Mont Buet was that of the Jean-André Deluc and his brother in 1765. After a second failed attempt, Deluc and his brother managed to reach the summit on 25 September 1770. Here, they carried out a series of scientific measurements which was the initial purpose of their expedition.

Using a portable barometer designed by himself, Deluc measured the air pressure on the summit. By comparing this result to a parallel measurement taken by his father in Geneva, and after correcting for temperature, Deluc inferred that Mont Buet was at an altitude of 2674 m above Lake Geneva, and 3040 m above sea level (2% less than the modern value). Deluc took advantage of the position and visibility of Mont Blanc from the summit of Mont Buet to determine its relative height, from which he derived that Mont Blanc was 4660 m above sea level. This was 400 m higher than the earlier trigonometric measurement of Mont Blanc by Nicolas Fatio de Duillier, and made the Mont Blanc the highest peak in Europe. Deluc also boiled water to determine how its boiling temperature varied with altitude.

Deluc reached the summit of Mont Buet from the side of Sixt by climbing directly through the cirque of Fonts. Because this route was considered to be too demanding, in 1775 the Genevan artist and travel writer Marc-Théodore Bourrit sought a different path from the southern side of Chamonix and Vallorcine. This path follows along the valley of the Bérard to the refuge of the Pierre à Bérard.

In 1776, the Genevan geologist Horace Bénédict de Saussure followed the path discovered by Bourrit to reach the summit of Mont Buet. Impressed with the view, Saussure instructed Bourrit with drawing a panorama (vue circulaire) from the summit of Mont Buet. This is generally considered to be the first 360-degree panorama, a genre of representation which became popular in the late eighteenth century. Saussure embarked on a second expedition in 1778 accompanied by Marc-Auguste Pictet and Jean Trembley who carried out measurements with a barometer and magnetometer. Using a sextant Pictet also measured the altitude of Mont Blanc, and found it to be 4727 m.

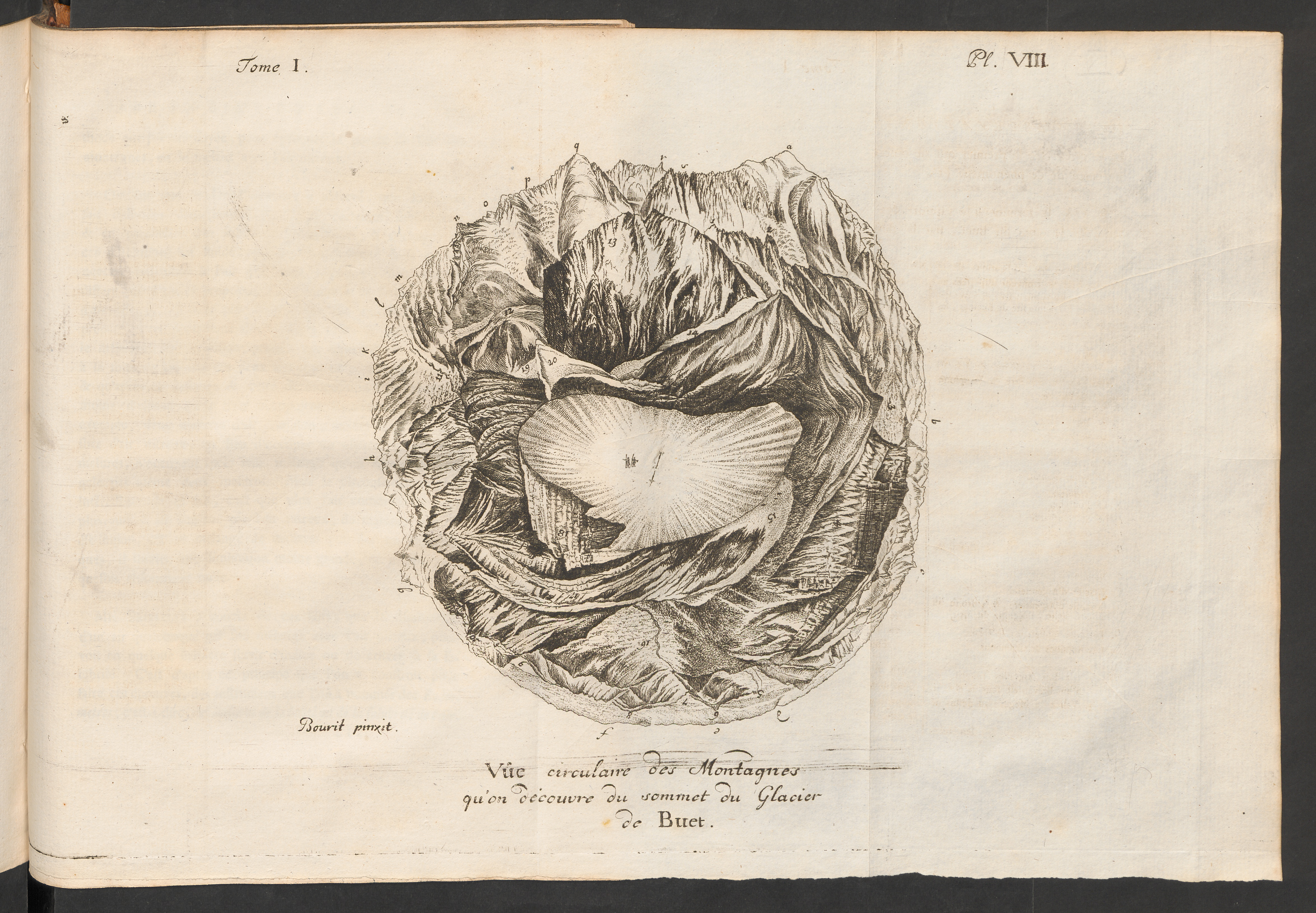
The panorama from the summit of Mont Buet drawn by Marc-Théodore Bourrit for Horace Bénédict de Saussure

== Climbing Routes ==
There are two principle routes to the summit of Mont Buet:

- From Sixt, through the Refuge du Grenairon.
- From Vallorcine, through the Refuge de la Pierre à Bérard.

== Views ==
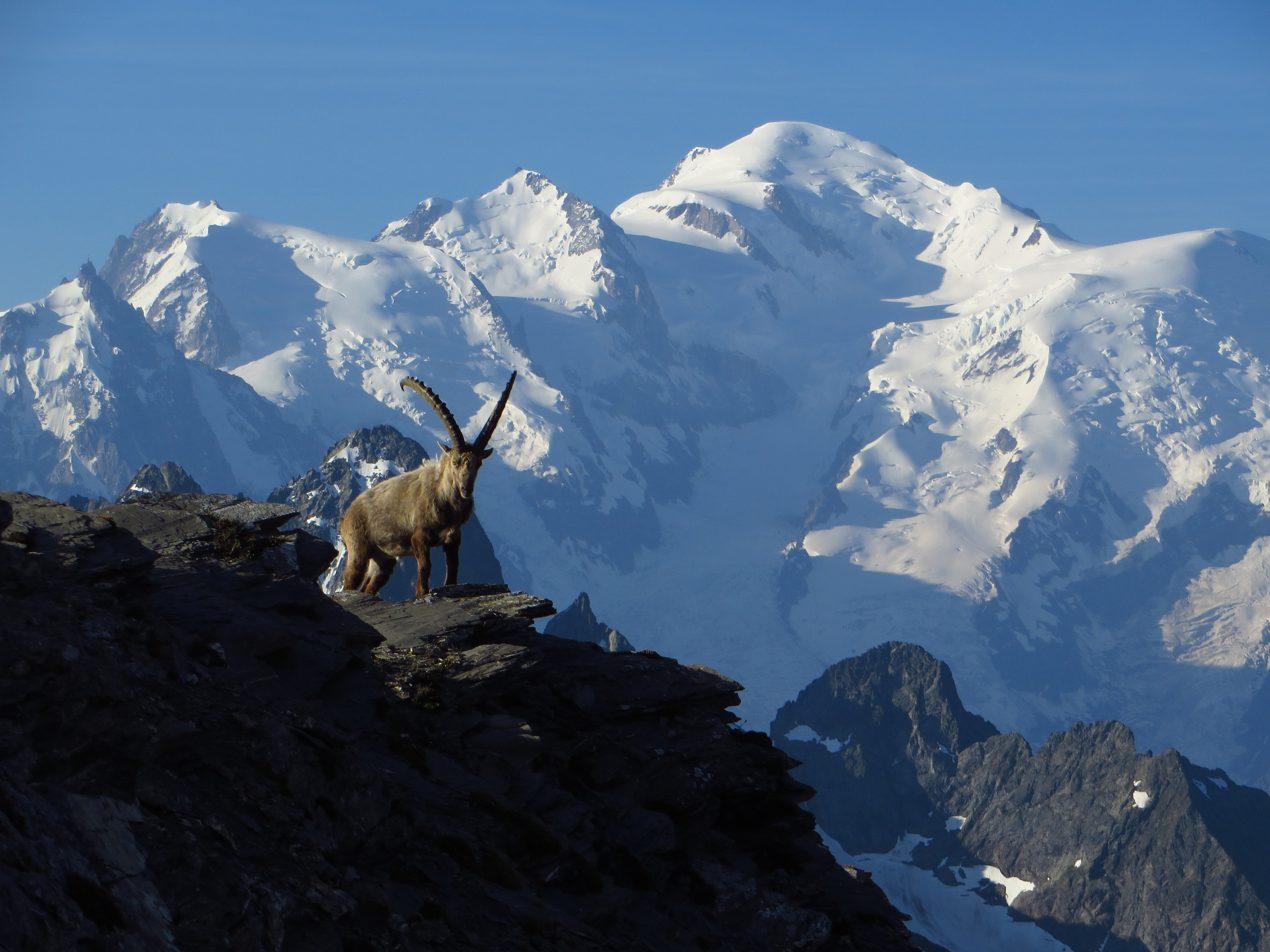
View of Mont Blanc from Mont Buet

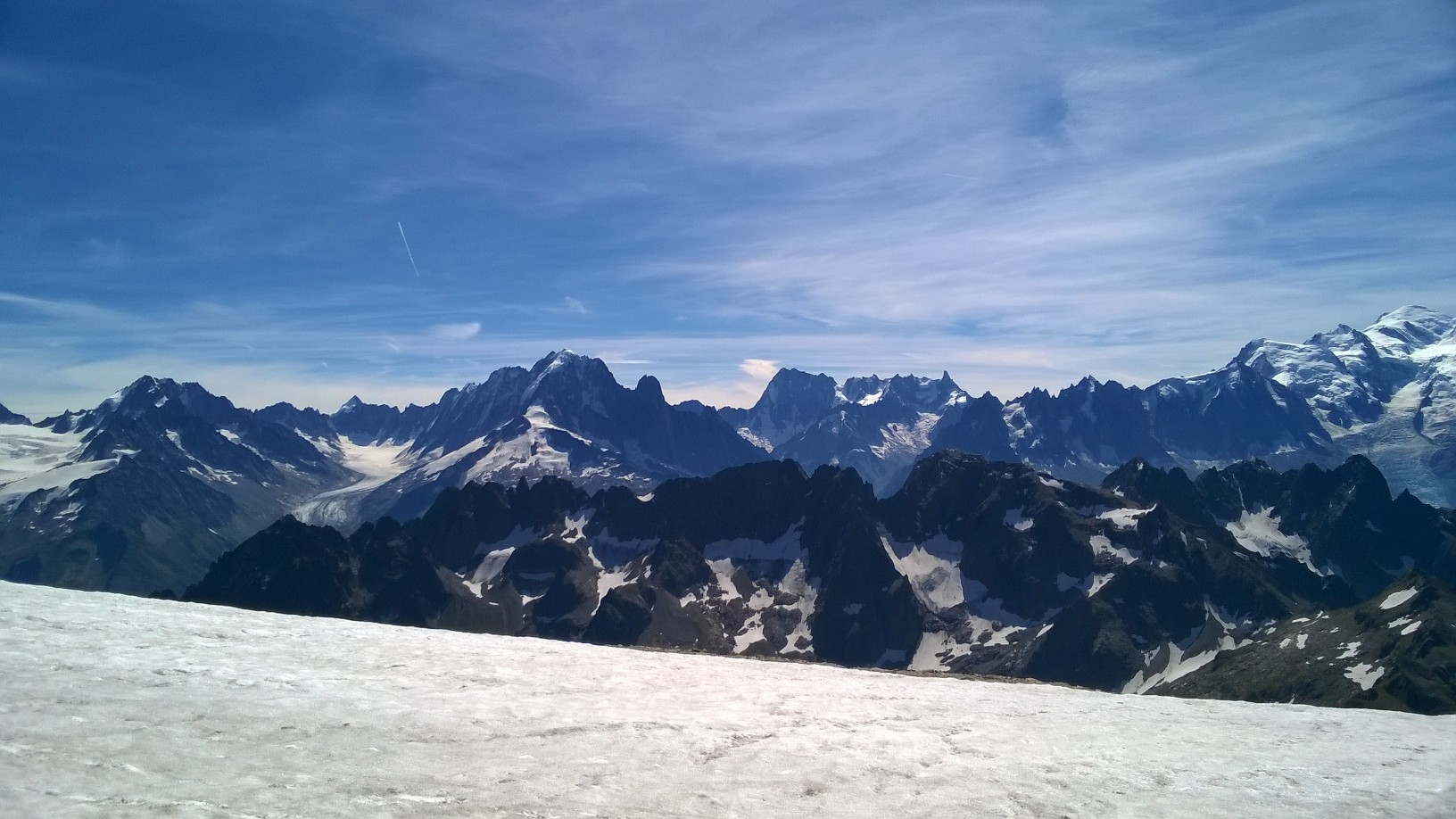
View of the Aiguilles Rouges

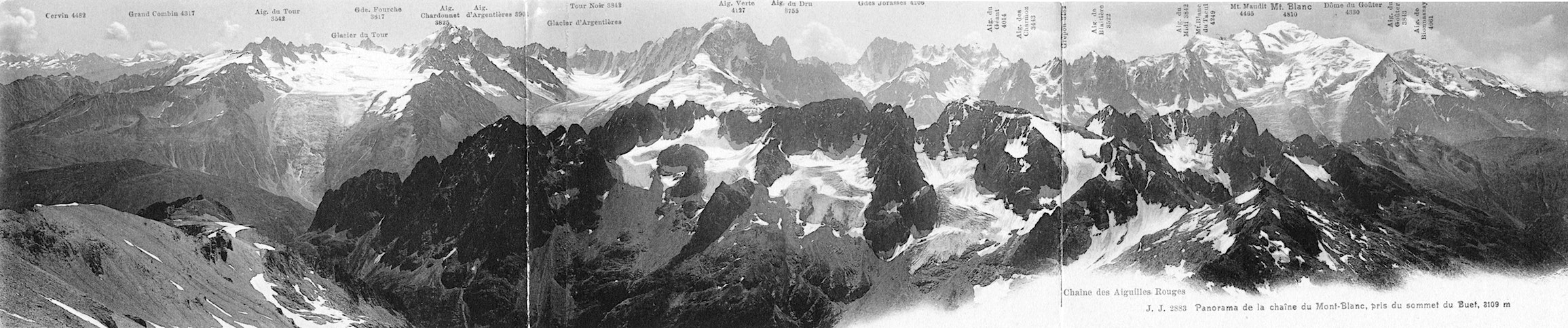
Panorama from Mont Buet, around 1900
