= Le Cheval Blanc (mountain) =

Mountain in Switzerland

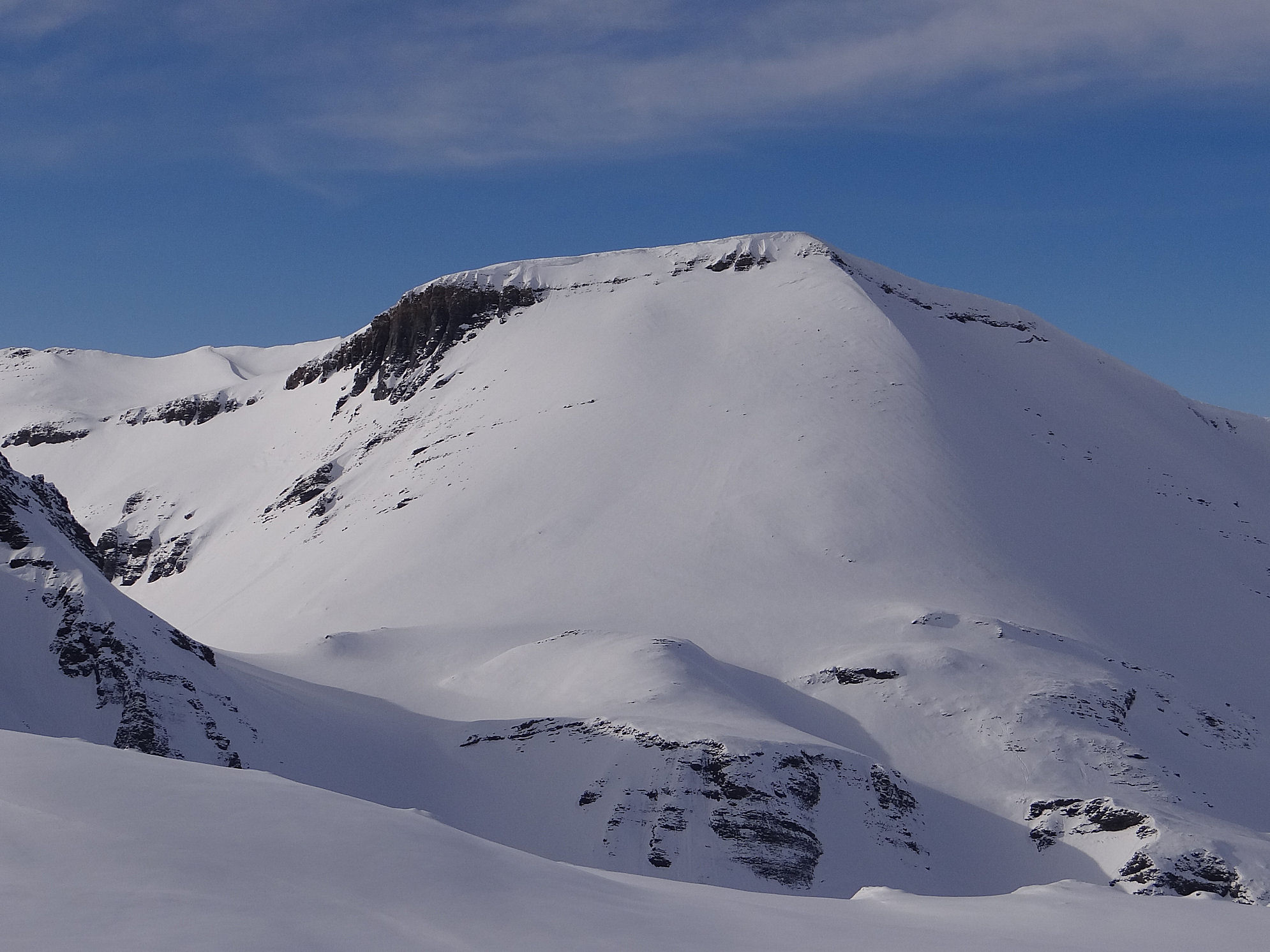
- Le Cheval Blanc

Highest point
- Elevation: 2,831 m (9,288 ft)
- Prominence: 140 m (460 ft)
- Parent peak: Mont Buet
- Coordinates: 46°03′07″N 6°52′13″E

Geography
- Location within Alps
- Location of Le Cheval Blanc Location in the Alps
- Location: Valais, Switzerland; Haute-Savoie, France
- Parent range: Chablais Alps

Le Cheval Blanc is a mountain in the Chablais Alps on the Swiss-French border. It overlooks the lake of Vieux Emosson on its eastern side.
