= Val d'Illiez =

Coordinates: 46°12′N 6°54′E

The Val d'Illiez is a valley in the Canton of Valais, Switzerland. It separates the northern foothills of the Chablais Alps from the Dents du Midi.

Starting from Monthey, the valley splits at Troistorrents into two parts:

- Val d'Illiez itself, with the villages of Val-d'Illiez and Champéry
- Val de Morgins, between Troistorrents and Morgins

== Villages ==
- Troistorrents
- Val-d'Illiez
- Champéry

== Panoramic view ==
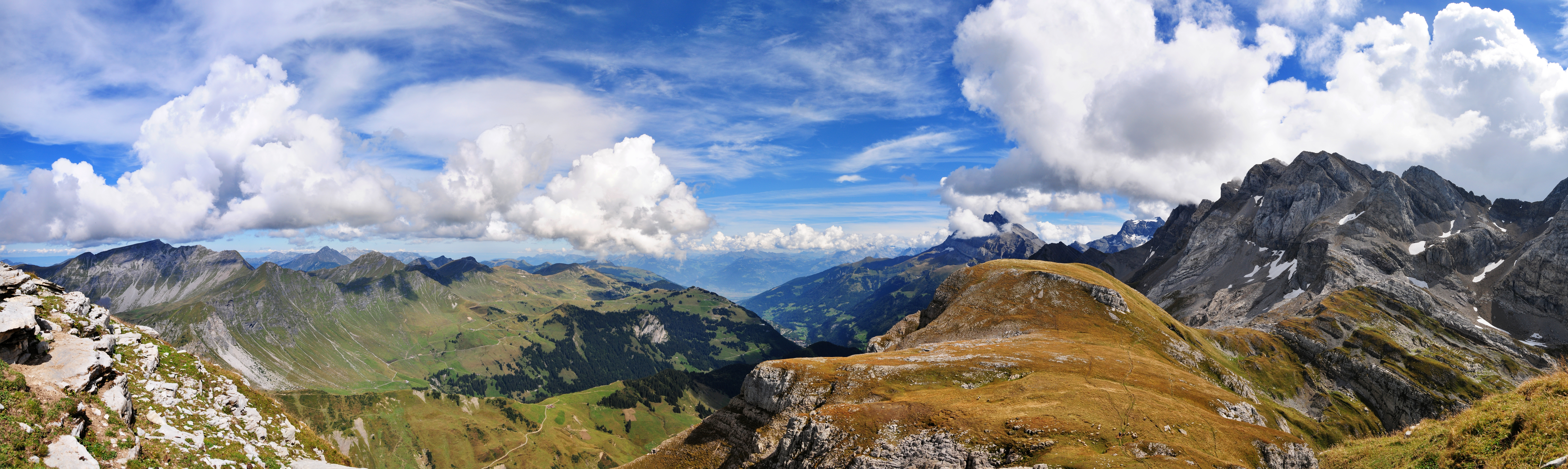
Panoramic view down Val d'Illiez towards Monthey. Hauts-Forts are at left, and Dents du Midi and Dents Blanches are at right.
