= Mont Billiat =

Mountain in France

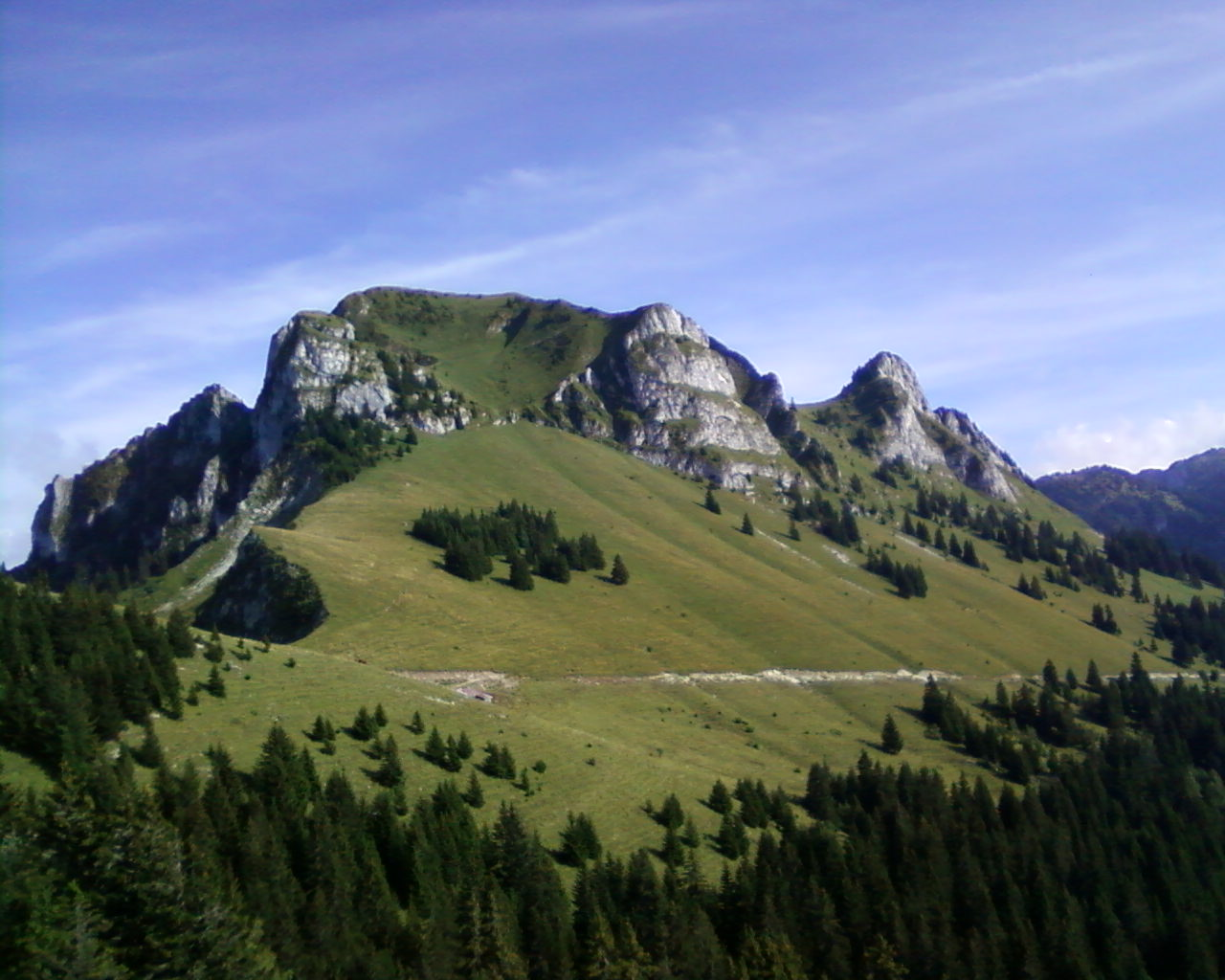

Highest point
- Elevation: 1,894 m (6,214 ft)
- Coordinates: 46°17′18″N 06°35′02″E

Geography
- Location within France
- Main peaks in Chablais Alps Mouse over (or touch) gives more detail of peaks. France
- Location: Haute-Savoie, France
- Parent range: Chablais Alps

Mont Billiat is a mountain of Haute-Savoie, France. It lies in the Chablais Alps range. It has an altitude of 1,894 metres (6,214 ft) above sea level.
