= Pointe des Brasses =

Mountain in Haute-Savoie, France

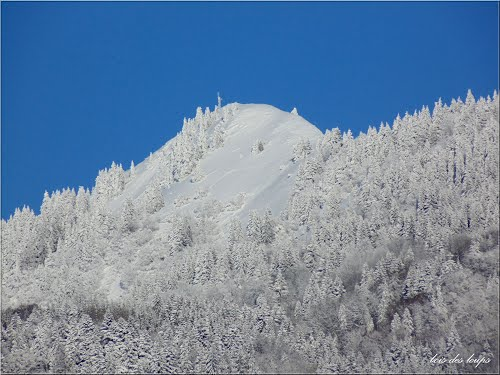

Highest point
- Elevation: 1,503 m (4,931 ft)
- Coordinates: 46°09′48″N 06°26′34″E

Geography
- Location within France
- Main peaks of the Chablais Alps Mouse over (or touch) gives more detail of peaks. Location in France
- Location: Haute-Savoie, France
- Parent range: Chablais Alps

Pointe des Brasses is a mountain of Haute-Savoie, France. It lies in the Chablais Alps range. It has an altitude of 1,503 metres (4,931 feet) above sea level. Its geology has been described with a ridgeline of limestone with echinoderm fossils.
