= Fontanabran =

Mountain in Switzerland

- Location within Switzerland
- Main peaks in Chablais Alps Mouse over (or touch) gives more detail of peaks.

Highest point
- Elevation: 2,703 m (8,868 ft)
- Prominence: 222 m (728 ft)
- Parent peak: Dents du Midi
- Coordinates: 46°05′59″N 6°56′18″E

Geography
- Location: Switzerland
- Parent range: Chablais Alps

The Fontanabran (French pronunciation: [fɔ̃tanabʁɑ̃]) is a mountain in the Chablais Alps in Switzerland.
