= Les Trables =

Mountain in France

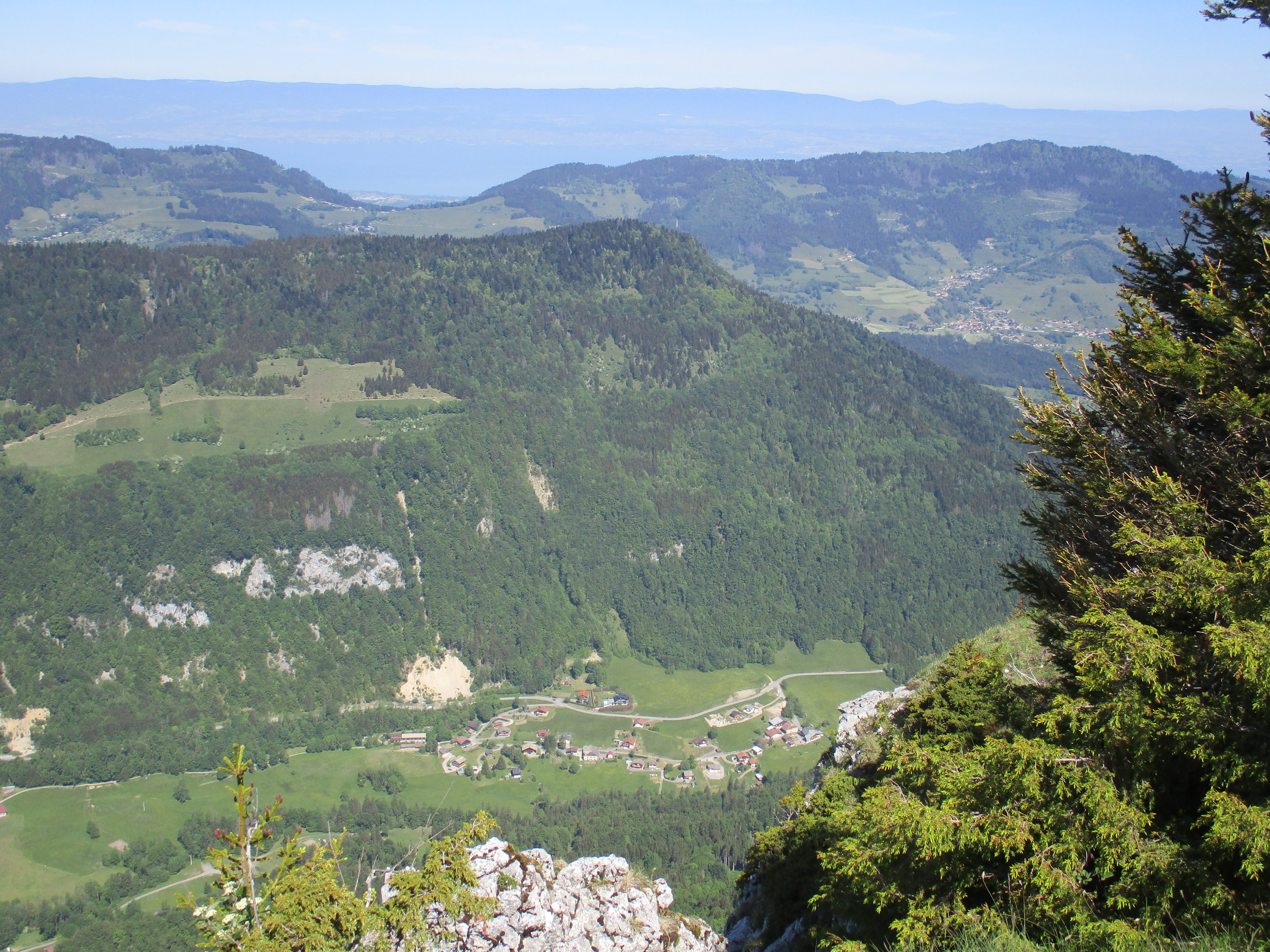
- View of Les Trables from the south. The Sur les Monts pastures are seen on its slopes to the middle left.

Highest point
- Elevation: 1,360 m (4,460 ft) (Note: OpenStreetMap has height at 1,361 m (4,465 ft))
- Coordinates: 46°16′41″N 06°32′14″E

Geography
- Location within France
- Main peaks of the Chablais Alps Mouse over (or touch) gives more detail of peaks.
- Location: Haute-Savoie, France
- Parent range: Chablais Alps

Mont Bichet, also known as Les Trables and, formerly, La Crêche, is a mostly wooded mountain in eastern France belonging to the Chablais Alps. Mont Bichet is the Haute-Savoie department and is surrounded by the three communes of the Brevon valley, Bellevaux, Lullin and Vailly. Its elevation is 1,360 m (4,460 ft). Its slopes include many former alpine pastures, now in ruins, covered by woodland and heavily populated with game animals. The alpine pastures on the mountain to its south at Sur les Monts fall from a ridge line with a height of 1,345 m (4,413 ft) which extends southwest to the peak of Narmont at 1,367 m (4,485 ft) high.

== Alpine pastures ==
- Le Moan to the east, is a former alpine pasture located in the commune of Vailly, with an elevation of 1,050 m (3,440 ft). It has been in disuse and wooded since the 1980s; its hillsides were used by the Maquis resistance fighters in World War II. A path leads from Le Moan to Sur les Monts.
- Le Plaine is another former pasture in Vailly, also used by the maquis. Disused and covered in woodland, it hosts a mill. It is accessible up to le Lavouet by taking the Sous la Joux road from the centre of the hamlet up to Granges Vulliez, passing on the left through the forest, then take the trail to le Plaine.
- Sur les Monts is a lieu-dit located in Bellevaux commune, at 1,126 m (3,694 ft) elevation.
- Les Granges de Lullin
- Le Gros Feu
