= Pointe de Miribel =

Mountain in France

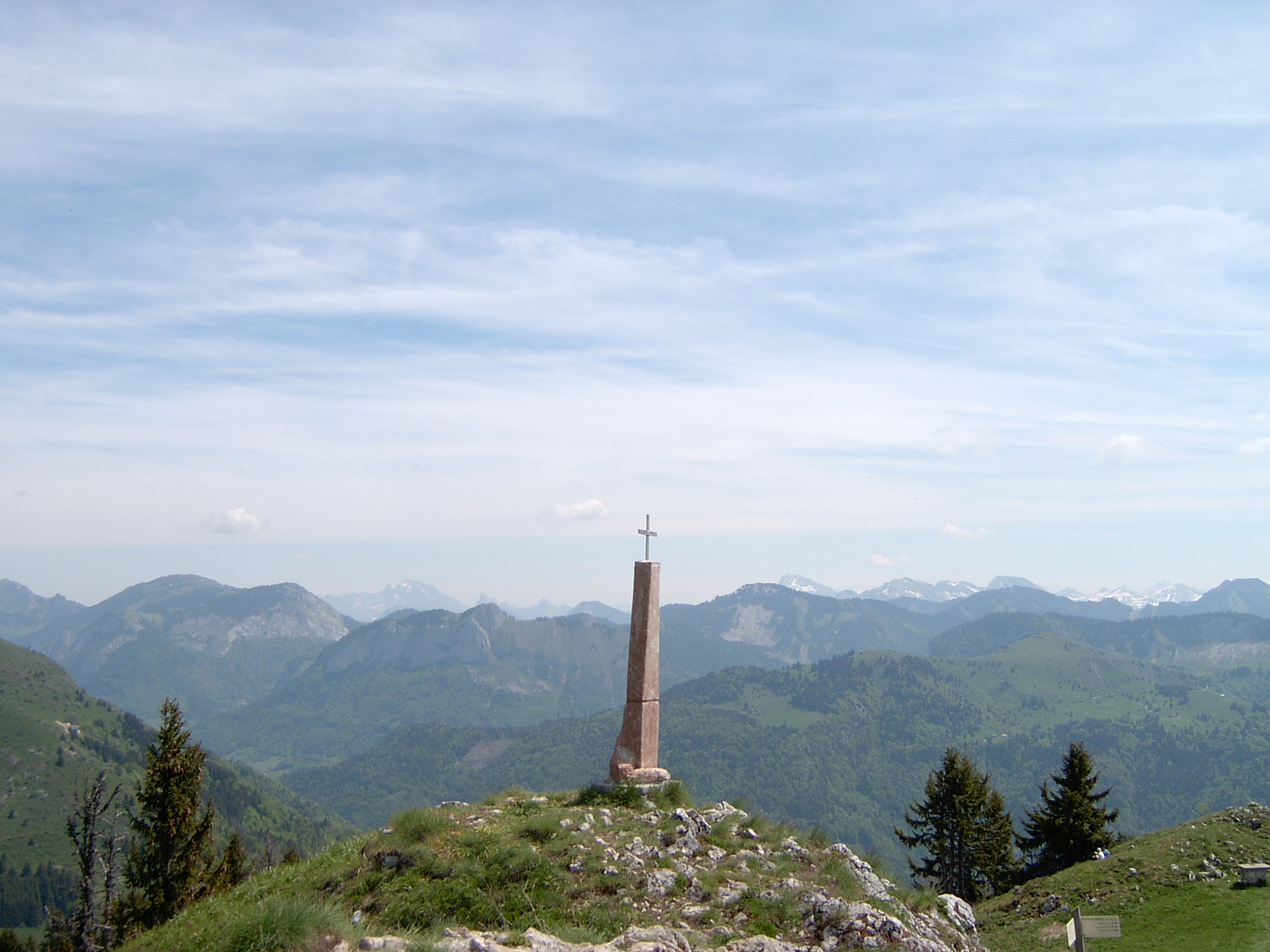

Highest point
- Elevation: 1,581 m (5,187 ft)
- Coordinates: 46°12′42″N 06°28′27″E

Geography
- Location within France
- Main peaks of the Chablais Alps Mouse over (or touch) gives more detail of peaks. France
- Location: Haute-Savoie, France
- Parent range: Chablais Alps

The Pointe de Miribel (1,581 m) is a mountain in the Chablais Alps in Haute-Savoie, France.

In toponymy, Miribel means "Beautiful view". At the top of the mountain lies a statue of the Virgin Mary.
