= Mont Orchez =

Mountain in Haute-Savoie, France

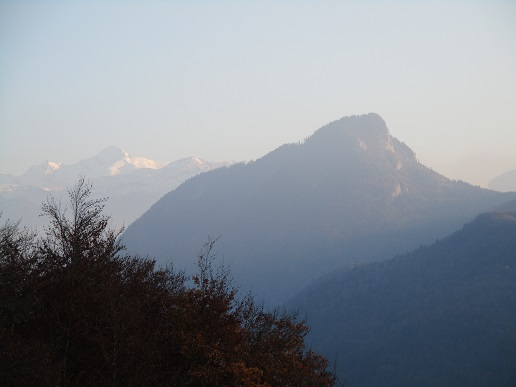

Highest point
- Elevation: 1,347 m (4,419 ft)
- Prominence: 604 m (1,982 ft)
- Coordinates: 46°05′57″N 06°33′02″E

Geography
- Location within France
- Main peaks of the Chablais Alps Mouse over (or touch) gives more detail of peaks. France
- Location: Haute-Savoie, France
- Parent range: Chablais Alps

Mont Orchez (1,347 m) is a mountain in the Chablais Alps in Haute-Savoie, France.
