= Montagne des Mémises =

Mountain in France

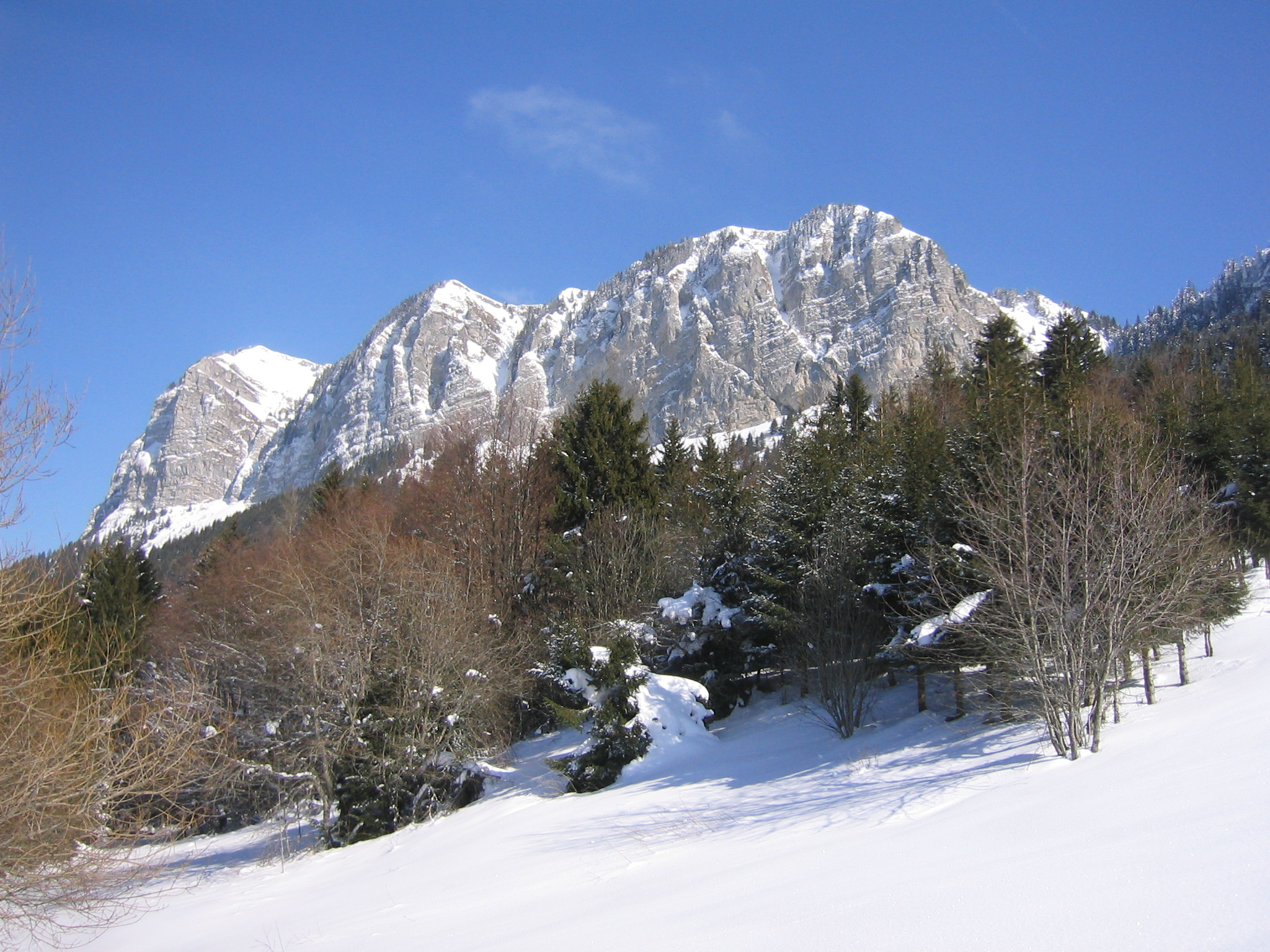

Highest point
- Elevation: 1,674 m (5,492 ft)
- Coordinates: 46°22′44″N 06°42′47″E

Geography
- Location within France
- Main peaks of Chablais Alps Mouse over (or touch) gives more detail of peaks. France
- Location: Haute-Savoie, France
- Parent range: Chablais Alps

Montagne des Mémises at 1,674 m (5,492 ft) is a mountain in the Chablais Alps in Haute-Savoie, France near the Franco-Swiss border. It lies to the south of Lake Geneva between Thonon-les-Bains in France and the Rhone Valley in Switzerland. It dominates the communes of Évian-les-Bains and Thollon-les-Mémises, and provides a panoramic view over Lac Léman of the Jura Massif and the Franco-Swiss Alps.

It is an upright syncline composed of Lias Group and Malm (Late Jurassic) layers of limestone related to the folding from the Bonnevaux-Col du Pertuis fault to the west, and the Rhone Valley fault to the east.
