= Pointe d'Ireuse =

Mountain in Haute-Savoie, France

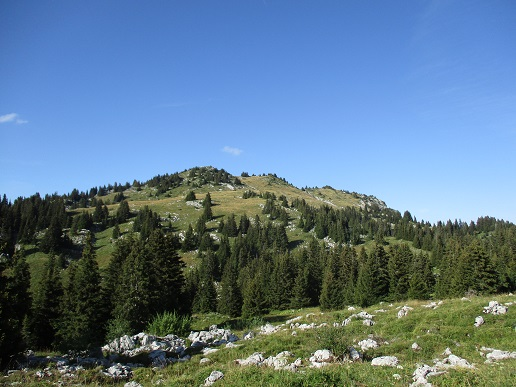

Highest point
- Elevation: 1,890 m (6,200 ft)
- Coordinates: 46°16′03″N 06°34′30″E

Geography
- Location within France
- Main peaks in Chablais Alps Mouse over (or touch) gives more detail of peaks. France
- Location: Haute-Savoie, France
- Parent range: Chablais Alps

The Pointe d'Ireuse at 1,890 m (6,200 ft) high is a mountain in the Chablais Alps in Haute-Savoie, France.
