= Pointe d'Anterne =

Mountain in Haute-Savoie, France

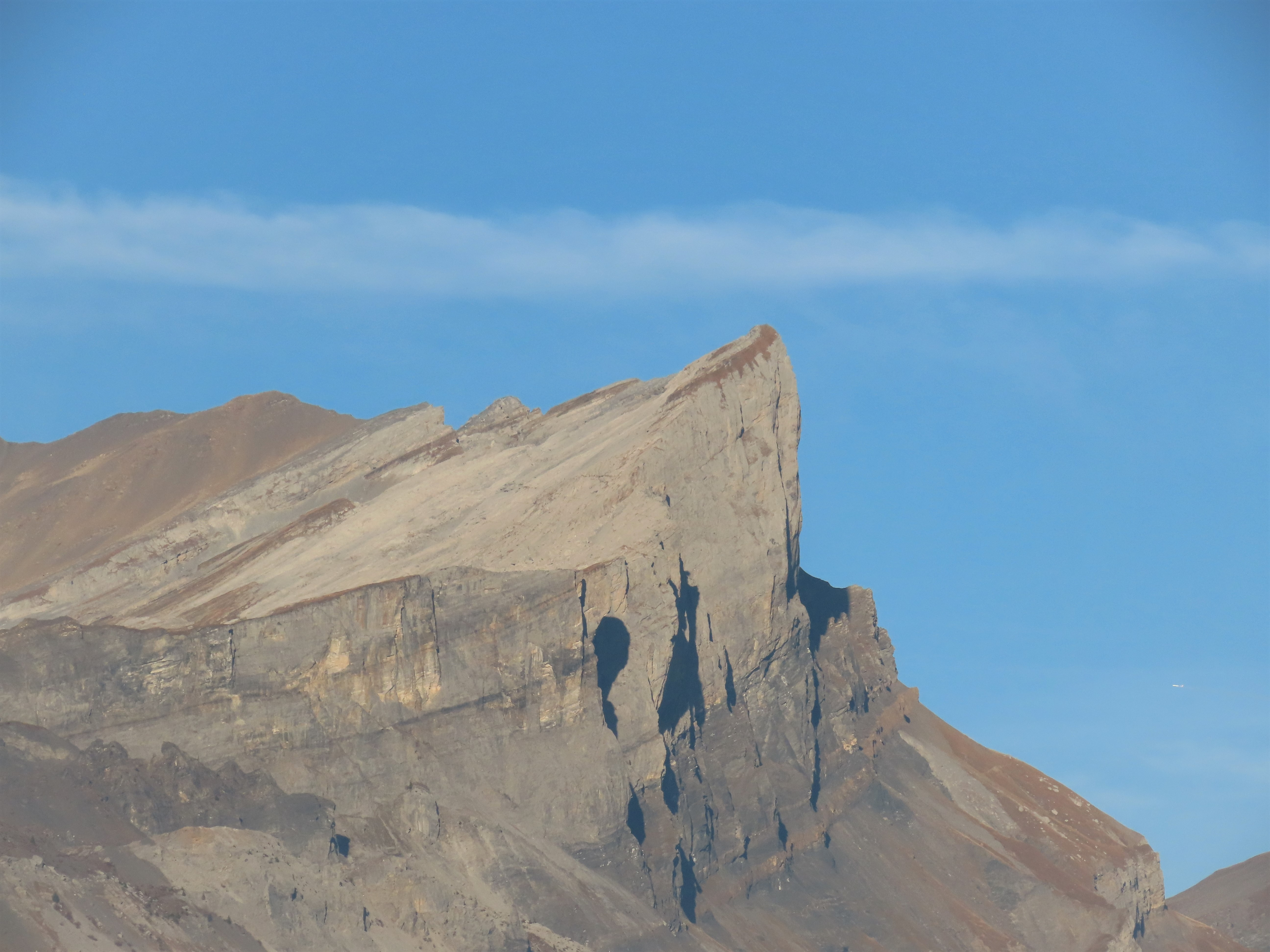

Highest point
- Elevation: 2,733 m (8,967 ft)
- Coordinates: 45°58′47″N 06°47′07″E

Geography
- Location within France
- Main peaks in Chablais Alps Mouse over (or touch) gives more detail of peaks. France
- Location: Haute-Savoie, France
- Parent range: Chablais Alps

Pointe d'Anterne is a mountain of Haute-Savoie, France. It lies in the Chablais Alps. It has an altitude of 2,733 metres (8,967 feet) above sea level.
