= Pointe de Chavasse =

Mountain in Haute-Savoie, France

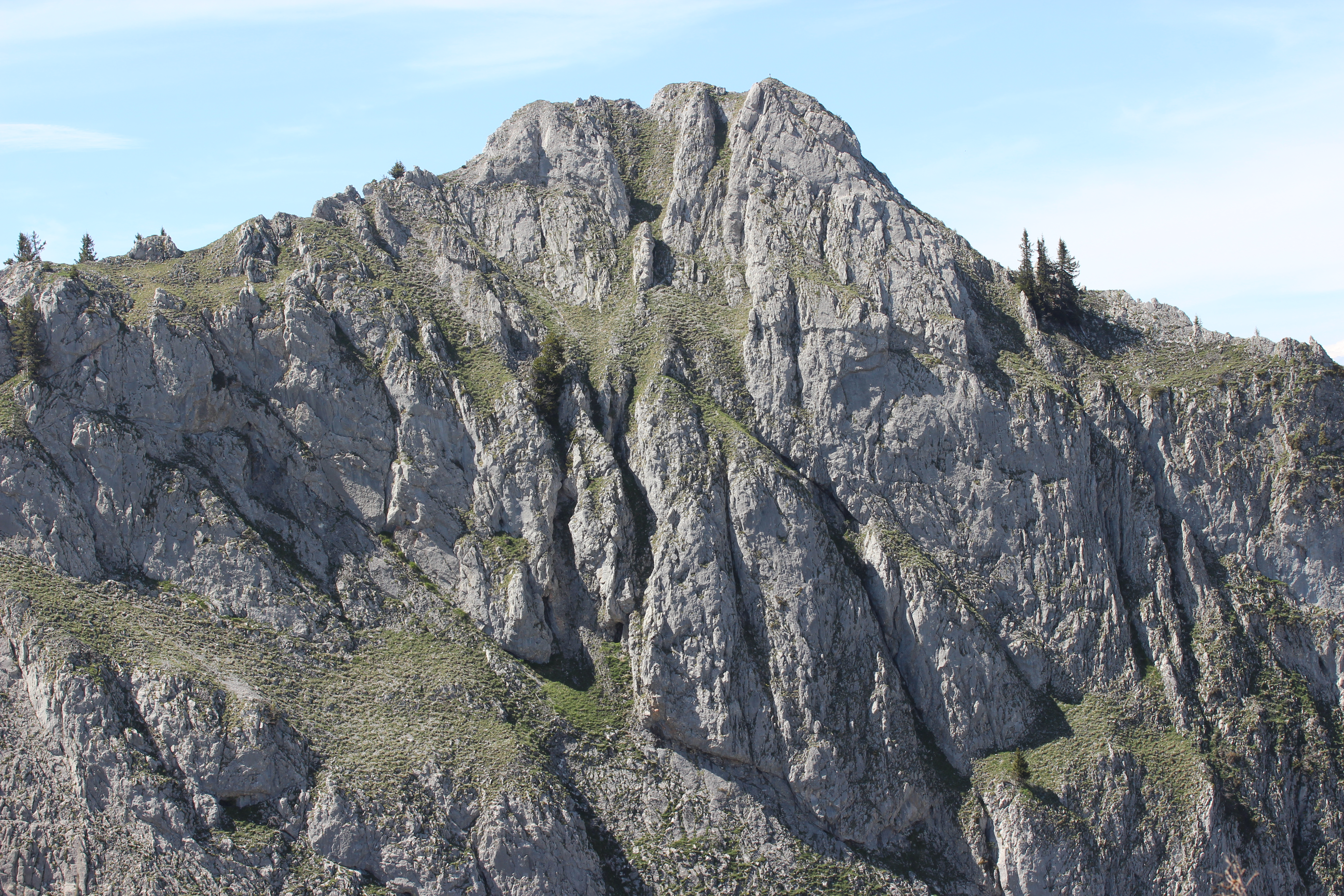

Highest point
- Elevation: 2,012 m (6,601 ft)
- Coordinates: 46°10′35″N 06°34′09″E

Geography
- Location within France
- Main peaks in Chablais Alps Mouse over (or touch) gives more detail of peaks. Location of Pointe de Chavasse
- Location: Haute-Savoie, France
- Parent range: Chablais Alps

Pointe de Chavasse at 2,012 m (6,601 ft) height is a mountain in the Chablais Alps in Haute-Savoie, France.
