= Les Marécottes =

Swiss village

Coordinates: 46°06′38″N 7°00′25″E

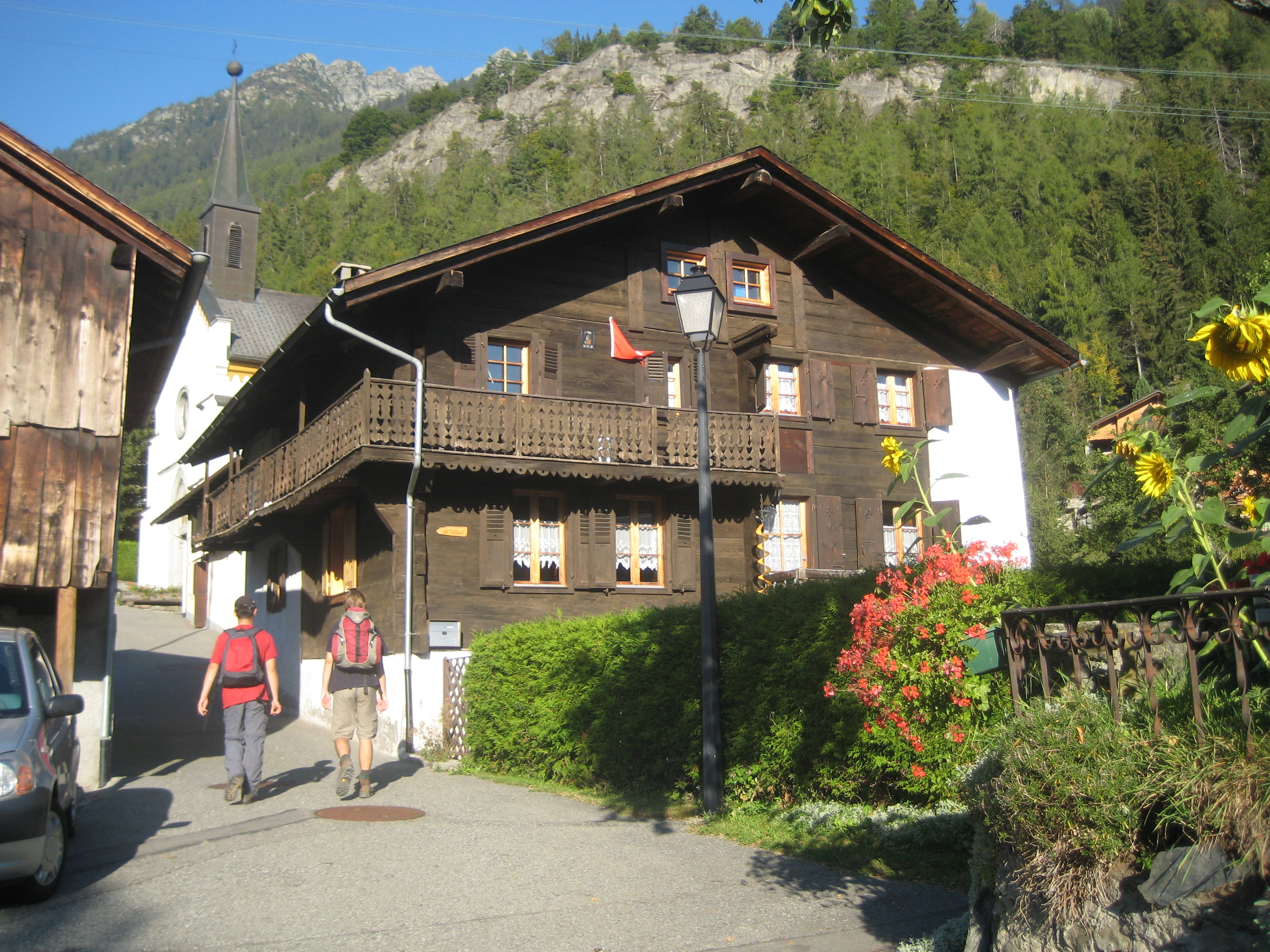
View from near the church

Les Marécottes is a village in the Swiss Alps, located in the canton of Valais. The village is situated in the western part of the canton, in the Trient Valley, near Martigny, at a height of 1,110 metres. It belongs to the municipality of Salvan.

Les Marécottes is a year-round popular tourist destination. Attractions include an Alpine zoo, a granite-carved swimming pool and a gondola climbing to La Creusaz (1,777 m), on the southern flanks of the Luisin. In winter the village also includes a ski area.

Les Marécottes is served by the Martigny–Châtelard Railway.
