= Pointe d'Uble =

Mountain in France

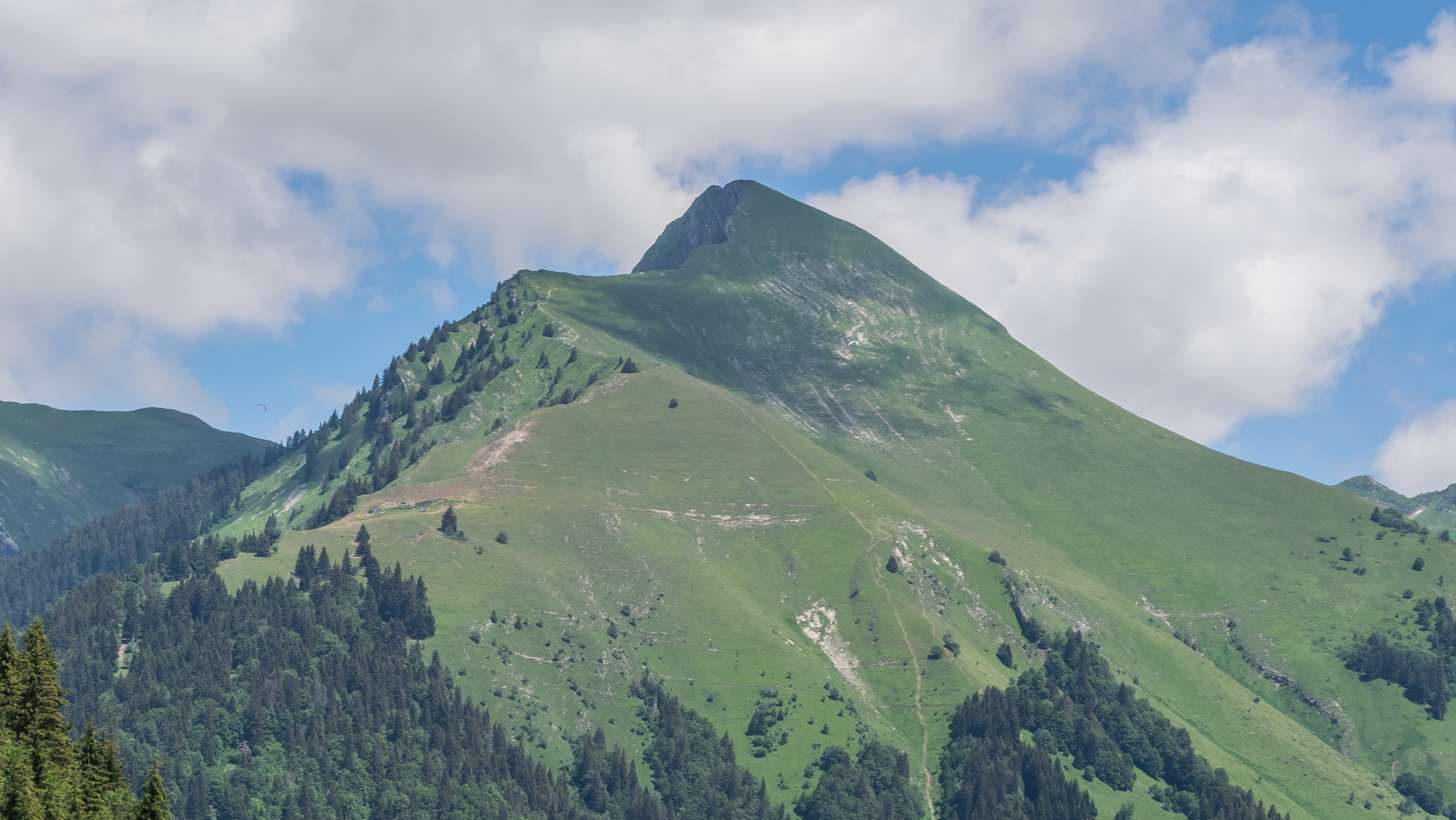

Highest point
- Elevation: 1,963 m (6,440 ft)
- Coordinates: 46°10′05″N 06°35′59″E

Geography
- Location within France
- Main peaks in Chablais Alps Mouse over (or touch) gives more detail of peaks. France
- Location: Haute-Savoie, France
- Parent range: Chablais Alps

Pointe d'Uble at 1,963 m (6,440 ft) high, is a mountain in the Chablais Alps in Haute-Savoie, France.
