= Mont Ouzon =

Mountain in France

- Location within France
- Main peaks of the Chablais Alps Mouse over (or touch) gives more detail of peaks. France

Highest point
- Elevation: 1,880 m (6,170 ft)
- Prominence: 644 m (2,113 ft)
- Coordinates: 46°17′59″N 06°38′40″E

Geography
- Location: Haute-Savoie, France
- Parent range: Chablais Alps

Mont Ouzon at 1,880 m (6,170 ft) high is a mountain in the Chablais Alps in Haute-Savoie, France.
