= Pointe de Nyon =

Mountain in Haute-Savoie, France

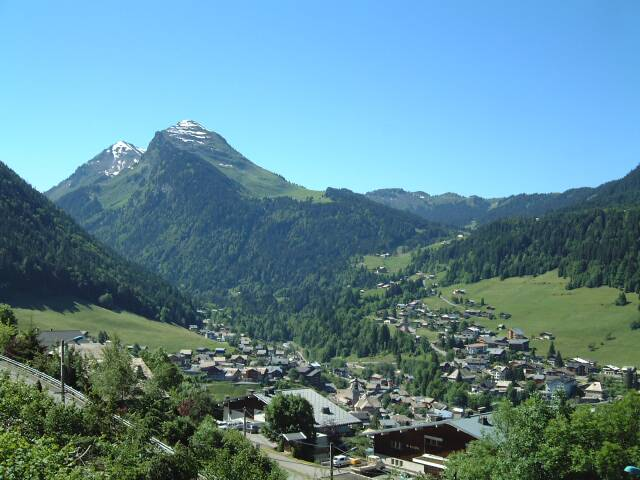
- Pointe de Nyon with Morzine in the foreground

Highest point
- Elevation: 2,019 m (6,624 ft)
- Coordinates: 46°08′48″N 06°43′19″E

Geography
- Location within France
- Main peaks in Chablais Alps Mouse over (or touch) gives more detail of peaks. France
- Location: Haute-Savoie, France
- Parent range: Chablais Alps

Pointe de Nyon at 2,019 m (6,624 ft) is a mountain in the Chablais Alps in Haute-Savoie, France.

== Geology ==
The light coloured mountain rock is folded fine grained limestone layered sometimes with more clay like formations in 2–30 cm (0.79–11.81 in) layers and orientated in a northwest to northeast fashion.
