= Grenier de Commune =

Mountain in France

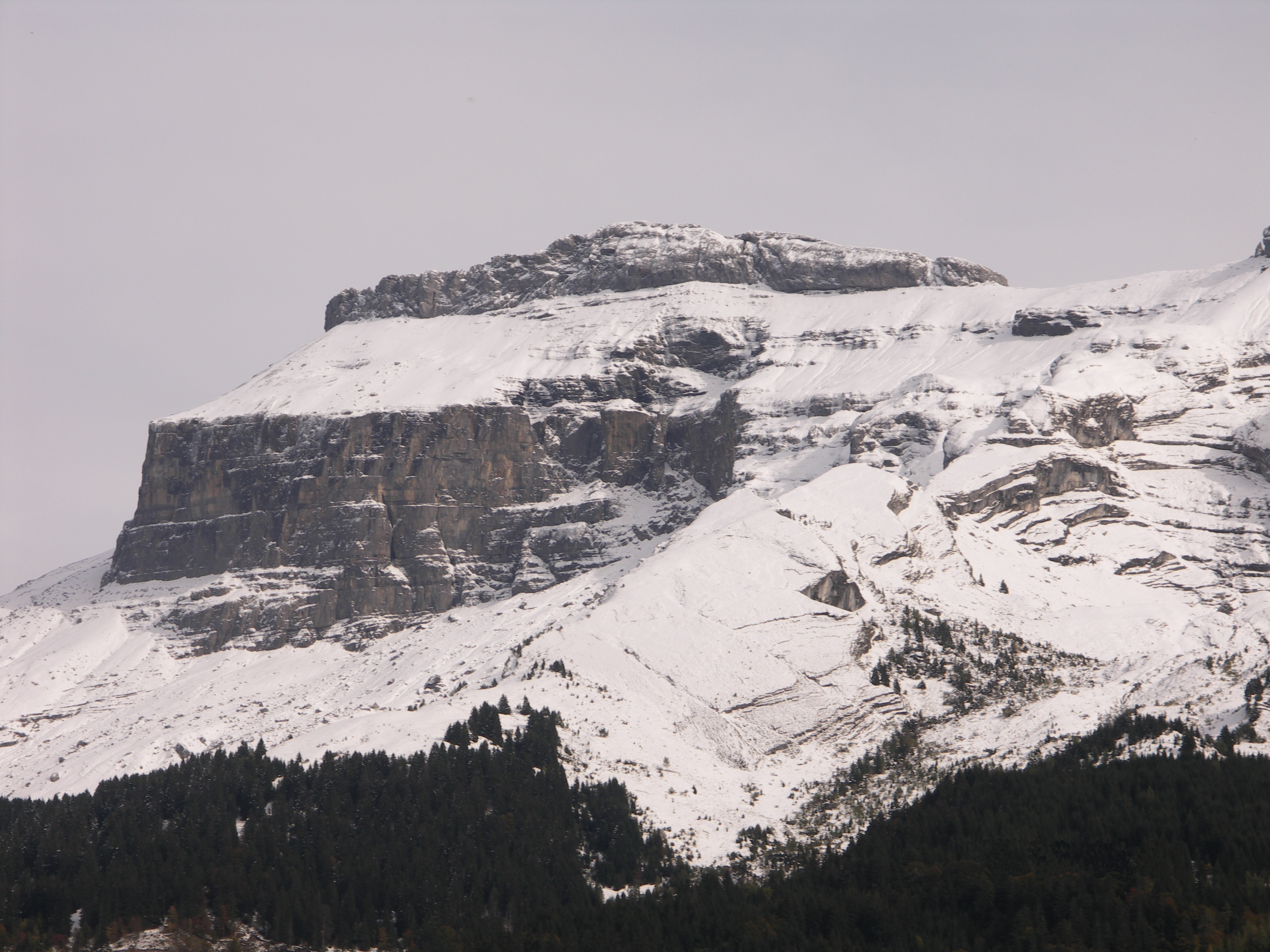

Highest point
- Elevation: 1,775 m (5,823 ft)
- Coordinates: 46°02′44″N 06°49′59″E

Geography
- Location within France
- Location of Grenier de Commune France
- Location: Haute-Savoie, France
- Parent range: Chablais Alps

The Grenier de Commune is a 2,775 m (9,104 ft) high mountain in the Chablais Alps in Haute-Savoie, France formed from Late Jurassic pale limestone.
