= Mont de Boisy =

- Location within France
- Main peaks of the Chablais Alps Mouse over (or touch) gives more detail of peaks. Location in eastern France

Highest point
- Elevation: 739 m (2,425 ft)
- Prominence: 199 m (653 ft)
- Coordinates: 46°18′28″N 06°21′28″E

Geography
- Location: Haute-Savoie, France
- Parent range: Chablais Alps

Mont de Boisy is a mountain of Haute-Savoie, France. It lies in the Chablais Alps range. It has an altitude of 739 metres above sea level, with a prominence of approximately 199m.
