= Marc-Théodore Bourrit =

Traveller and writer from the Republic of Geneva

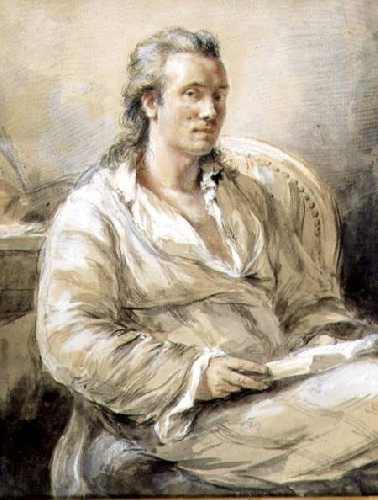
Portrait (1798) by Jean-Pierre Saint-Ours

Marc-Théodore Bourrit (1739–1819) was a traveller and writer from the Republic of Geneva.

== Biography ==
Marc-Théodore Bourrit came of a family which was of French origin but had taken refuge at Geneva for reasons connected with religion. His father was a watchmaker there, and he himself was educated in his native city. He was a good artist and etcher, and also a pastor, so that by reason of his fine voice and love of music he was made (1768) precentor of the church of St Peter (the former cathedral) at Geneva.

This post enabled him to devote himself to the exploration of the Alps, for which he had conceived a great passion ever since an ascent (1761) of the Voirons, near Geneva. In 1775 he made the first ascent of the Buet (3096 m) by the now usual route from the Pierre à Bérard, on which the great flat rock known as the Table au Chantre still preserves his memory. In 1784–1785 he was the first traveller to attempt the ascent of Mont Blanc (not conquered till 1786), but neither then nor later (1788) did he succeed in reaching its summit. On the other hand, he reopened (1787) the route over the Col du Géant (3371 m), which had fallen into oblivion, and travelled also among the mountains of the Valais and the Bernese Oberland.

He received a pension from Louis XVI, and was named the historiographe des Alpes by Emperor Joseph II, who visited him at Geneva. His last visit to Chamonix was in 1812.

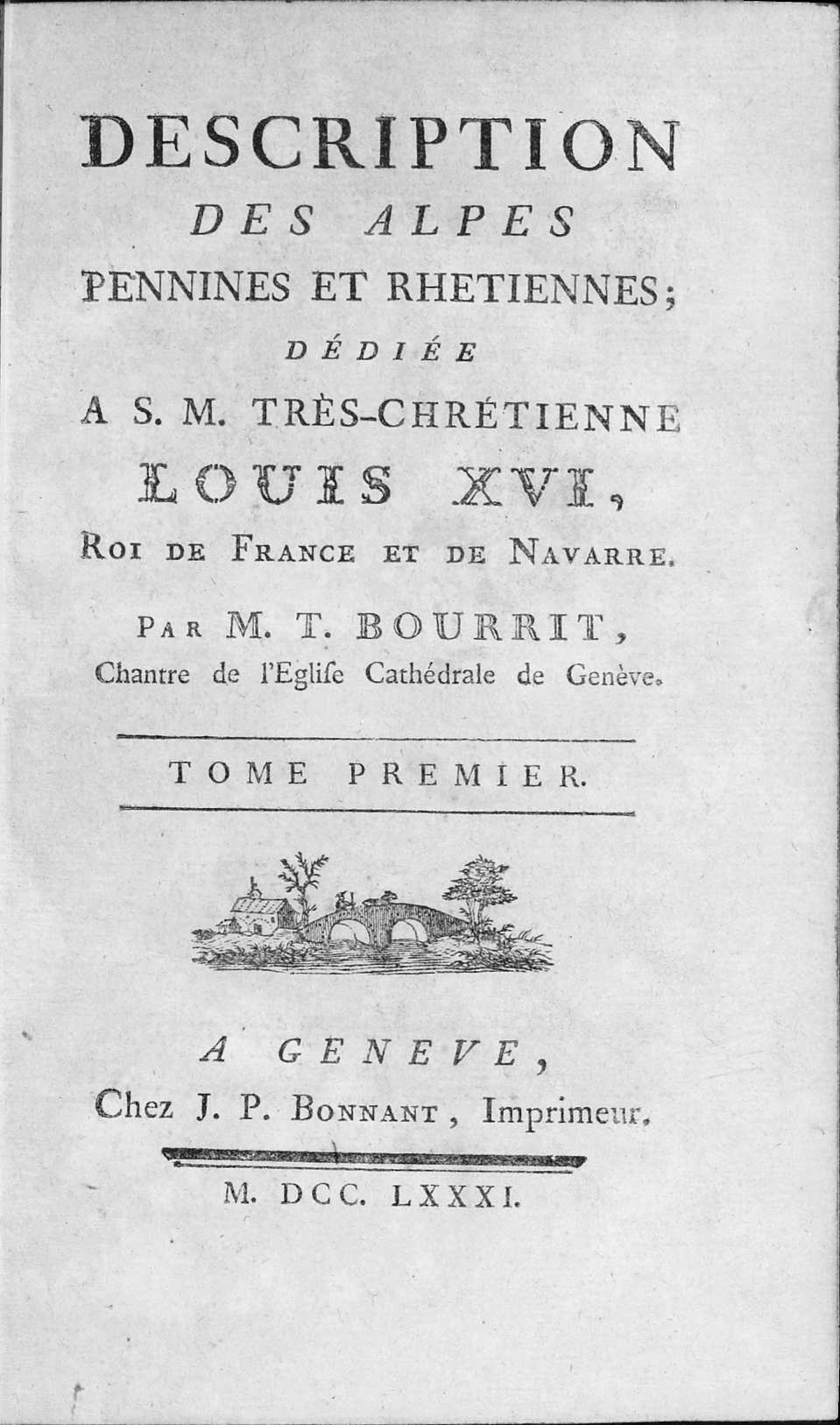
Description des Alpes Pennines et Rhetiennes, 1781

Bourrit's writings are composed in a naive, sentimental and rather pompous style, but breathe throughout a most passionate love for the Alps, as wonders of nature, and not as objects of scientific study. His chief works are the Description des glacières de Savoye, 1773 (English translation, Norwich, 1775–1776), the Description des Alpes pennines et rhétiennes (2 vols., 1781), and the Descriptions des cols ou passages des Alpes, (2 vols., 1803), while his Itinéraire de Genève, Lausanne et Chamouni, first published in 1791, went through several editions in his lifetime.

== Works ==
- Description des glacières de Savoye, 1773. English translation, Norwich, 1775–1776.
- Description des Alpes Pennines et Rhetiennes. Vol. 1. Genève. 1781 – via Jean Pierre Bonnant.
- Description des Alpes Pennines et Rhetiennes. Vol. 2. Genève. 1781 – via Jean Pierre Bonnant.
- Itinéraire de Genève. Lausanne et Chamouni, 1791; with several editions.
- Descriptions des cols ou passages des Alpes, 2 vols., 1803.
