= Hauts-Forts =

Mountain in France

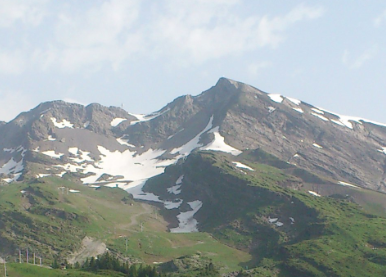
- View from Avoriaz

Highest point
- Elevation: 2,466 m (8,091 ft)
- Prominence: 545 m (1,788 ft)
- Parent peak: Dents du Midi
- Coordinates: 46°10′07″N 06°46′39″E

Geography
- Location within Alps
- Main peaks in Chablais Alps Mouse over (or touch) gives more detail of peaks. Location of Hauts-Forts
- Location: Haute-Savoie, France
- Parent range: Chablais Alps

The Hauts-Forts at 2,466 m (8,091 ft), is a mountain of the Chablais Alps, located east of Morzine in the French department of Haute-Savoie, within one kilometre of the Swiss border.

The closest locality is Avoriaz, from where a cable car leads to its summit.
