= Troistorrents =

- Municipality
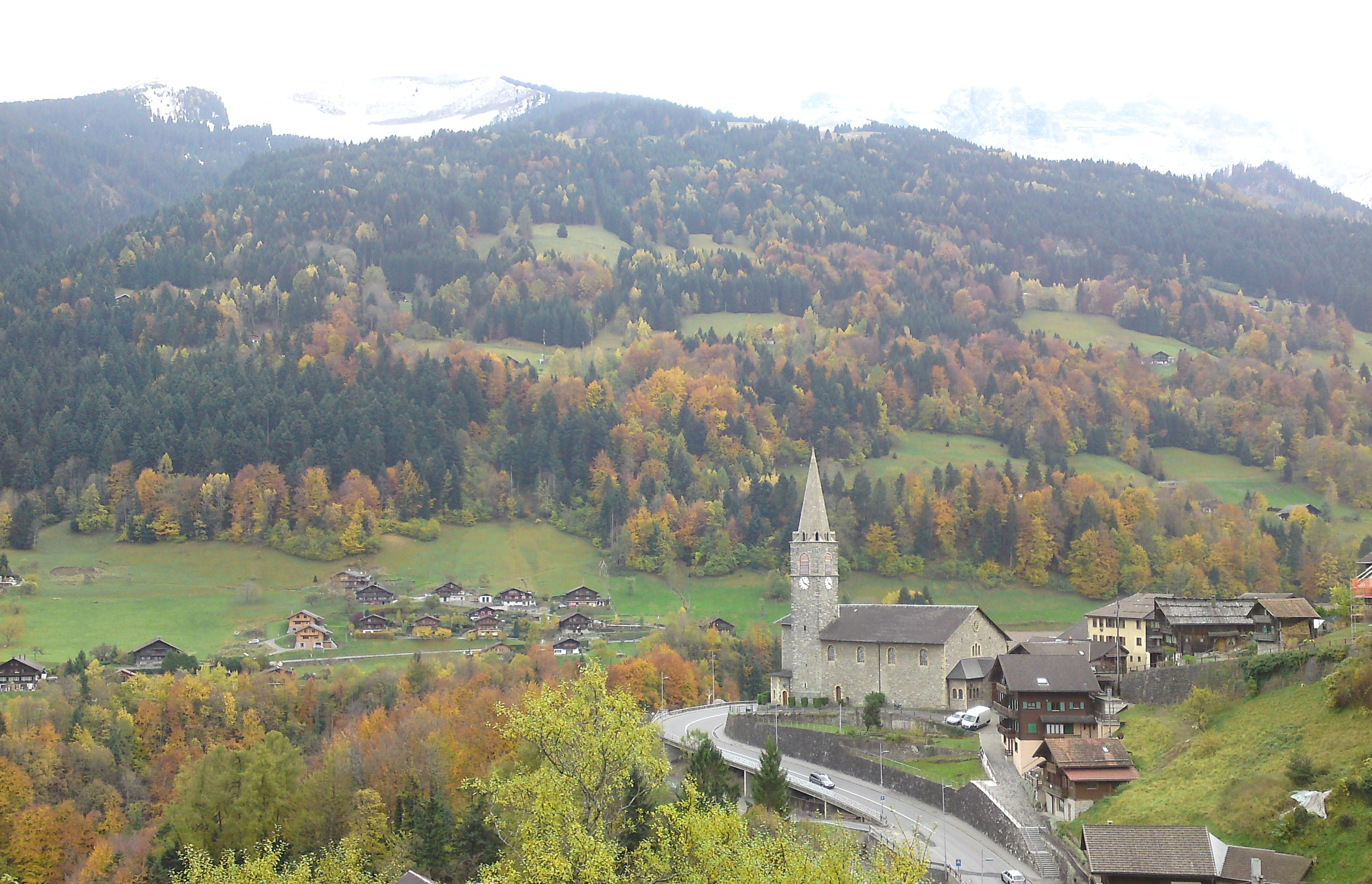

- Flag Coat of arms
- Location of Troistorrents
- Location within Switzerland Location within Canton of Valais
- Coordinates: 46°14′N 6°55′E
- Country: Switzerland
- Canton: Valais
- District: Monthey

Government
  - Mayor: Fabrice Donnet-Monay CVP/PDC

Area
  - Total: 37.0 km^{2} (14.3 sq mi)
- Elevation: 765 m (2,510 ft)

Population (December 2002)
  - Total: 3,803
  - Density: 103/km^{2} (266/sq mi)
- Time zone: UTC+01:00 (CET)
  - Summer (DST): UTC+02:00 (CEST)
- Postal code: 1872
- SFOS number: 6156
- ISO 3166 code: CH-VS
- Surrounded by: Châtel (FR-74), Collombey-Muraz, Monthey, Val-d'Illiez, Vérossaz
- Website: www.troistorrents.ch

Troistorrents (French pronunciation: [tʁwatɔʁɑ̃]; Arpitan: Trètorrent) is a municipality in the district of Monthey in the canton of Valais in Switzerland.

== Geography ==
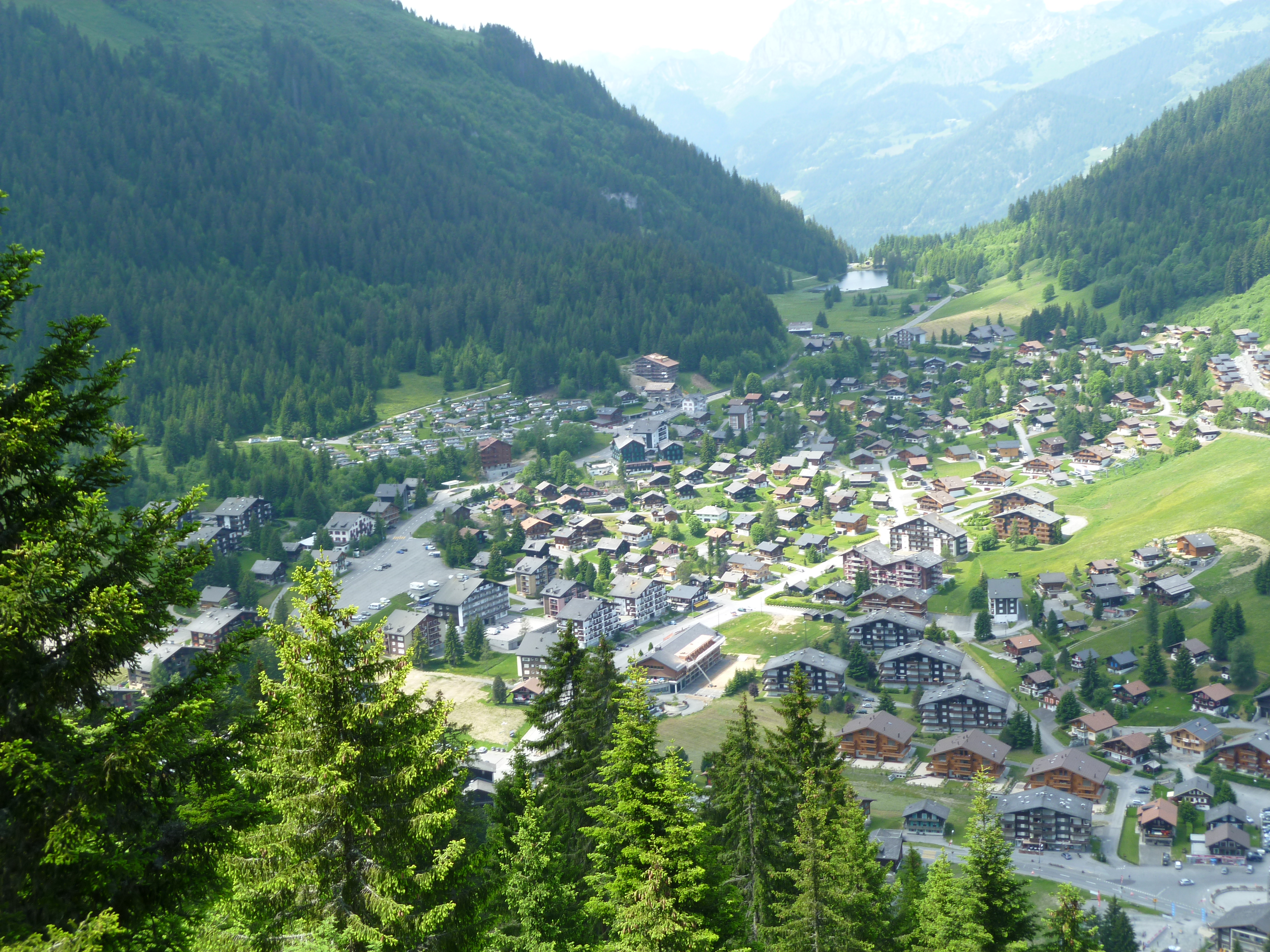
View of Morgins from the Foilleuse chair lift

Troistorrents has an area, as of 2009, of 37 square kilometers (14 mi^{2}). Of this area, 13.54 km^{2} (5.23 mi^{2}) or 36.6% is used for agricultural purposes, while 19.14 km^{2} (7.39 mi^{2}) or 51.8% is forested. Of the rest of the land, 2.72 km^{2} (1.05 mi^{2}) or 7.4% is settled (buildings or roads), 0.21 km^{2} (0.081 mi^{2}) or 0.6% is either rivers or lakes and 1.34 km^{2} (0.52 mi^{2}) or 3.6% is unproductive land.

Of the built up area, housing and buildings made up 4.6% and transportation infrastructure made up 2.3%. Out of the forested land, 47.5% of the total land area is heavily forested and 2.9% is covered with orchards or small clusters of trees. Of the agricultural land, 0.0% is used for growing crops and 8.9% is pastures and 27.1% is used for alpine pastures. All the water in the municipality is flowing water.

The municipality includes the village of Morgins.

It is located in the Val d'Illiez. It is the starting point to reach Morgins via the Val de Morgins. The name Troistorrents, contrary to most expectations, does not mean "three torrents" (there are far more than three). Rather it descends from the Latin "trans torrentium" which means "on the other side of the torrent".

== Coat of arms ==
The blazon of the municipal coat of arms is In azure with three Fir trees Vert stemmed proper, planted on three mountains of the same between which flow two mountain streams in pale Argent which fall into a third stream in fess; the mountain in the middle charged with a woman sitting, clothed Gules and holding on her knees her child dressed Argent and throwing grain Or.

== Demographics ==
Troistorrents has a population (as of December 2020) of 4,806. As of 2008, 10.4% of the population are resident foreign nationals. Over the last 10 years (2000–2010 ) the population has changed at a rate of 12.7%. It has changed at a rate of 10% due to migration and at a rate of 4.2% due to births and deaths.

Most of the population (as of 2000) speaks French (3,381 or 94.8%) as their first language, German is the second most common (90 or 2.5%) and English is the third (23 or 0.6%). There are 19 people who speak Italian and 1 person who speaks Romansh.

As of 2008, the population was 50.1% male and 49.9% female. The population was made up of 1,841 Swiss men (44.4% of the population) and 236 (5.7%) non-Swiss men. There were 1,857 Swiss women (44.8%) and 209 (5.0%) non-Swiss women. Of the population in the municipality, 1,727 or about 48.4% were born in Troistorrents and lived there in 2000. There were 690 or 19.3% who were born in the same canton, while 664 or 18.6% were born somewhere else in Switzerland, and 375 or 10.5% were born outside of Switzerland.

As of 2000, children and teenagers (0–19 years old) make up 26.5% of the population, while adults (20–64 years old) make up 60.6% and seniors (over 64 years old) make up 13%.

As of 2000, there were 1,491 people who were single and never married in the municipality. There were 1,776 married individuals, 162 widows or widowers and 138 individuals who are divorced.

As of 2000, there were 1,364 private households in the municipality, and an average of 2.5 persons per household. There were 367 households that consist of only one person and 117 households with five or more people. In 2000, a total of 1,318 apartments (43.8% of the total) were permanently occupied, while 1,515 apartments (50.3%) were seasonally occupied and 178 apartments (5.9%) were empty. As of 2009, the construction rate of new housing units was 2.4 new units per 1000 residents. The vacancy rate for the municipality, in 2010, was 0.55%.

The historical population is given in the following chart:

== Politics ==
In the 2007 federal election the most popular party was the CVP which received 36.37% of the vote. The next three most popular parties were the SVP (24.58%), the FDP (21.7%) and the SP (10.35%). In the federal election, a total of 1,479 votes were cast, and the voter turnout was 51.1%.

In the 2009 Conseil d'État/Staatsrat election a total of 1,176 votes were cast, of which 123 or about 10.5% were invalid. The voter participation was 41.5%, which is much less than the cantonal average of 54.67%. In the 2007 Swiss Council of States election a total of 1,437 votes were cast, of which 106 or about 7.4% were invalid. The voter participation was 50.2%, which is much less than the cantonal average of 59.88%.

== Economy ==
As of 2010, Troistorrents had an unemployment rate of 3.7%. As of 2008, there were 75 people employed in the primary economic sector and about 39 businesses involved in this sector. 275 people were employed in the secondary sector and there were 46 businesses in this sector. 506 people were employed in the tertiary sector, with 97 businesses in this sector. There were 1,713 residents of the municipality who were employed in some capacity, of which females made up 38.6% of the workforce.

In 2008 the total number of full-time equivalent jobs was 710. The number of jobs in the primary sector was 36, of which 31 were in agriculture and 6 were in forestry or lumber production. The number of jobs in the secondary sector was 262 of which 91 or (34.7%) were in manufacturing and 166 (63.4%) were in construction. The number of jobs in the tertiary sector was 412. In the tertiary sector; 94 or 22.8% were in wholesale or retail sales or the repair of motor vehicles, 34 or 8.3% were in the movement and storage of goods, 73 or 17.7% were in a hotel or restaurant, 1 was in the information industry, 15 or 3.6% were the insurance or financial industry, 11 or 2.7% were technical professionals or scientists, 55 or 13.3% were in education and 52 or 12.6% were in health care.

In 2000, there were 278 workers who commuted into the municipality and 1,163 workers who commuted away. The municipality is a net exporter of workers, with about 4.2 workers leaving the municipality for every one entering. About 19.1% of the workforce coming into Troistorrents are coming from outside Switzerland. Of the working population, 6.8% used public transportation to get to work, and 76.1% used a private car.

== Religion ==
From the 2000 census, 2,827 or 79.3% were Roman Catholic, while 312 or 8.7% belonged to the Swiss Reformed Church. Of the rest of the population, there were 4 members of an Orthodox church (or about 0.11% of the population), there were 4 individuals (or about 0.11% of the population) who belonged to the Christian Catholic Church, and there were 58 individuals (or about 1.63% of the population) who belonged to another Christian church. There was 1 individual who was Jewish, and 19 (or about 0.53% of the population) who were Islamic. There was 1 person who was Buddhist and 3 individuals who belonged to another church. 205 (or about 5.75% of the population) belonged to no church, are agnostic or atheist, and 158 individuals (or about 4.43% of the population) did not answer the question.

== Education ==
In Troistorrents about 1,262 or (35.4%) of the population have completed non-mandatory upper secondary education, and 300 or (8.4%) have completed additional higher education (either university or a Fachhochschule). Of the 300 who completed tertiary schooling, 54.0% were Swiss men, 28.3% were Swiss women, 9.3% were non-Swiss men and 8.3% were non-Swiss women.

As of 2000, there were 115 students in Troistorrents who came from another municipality, while 136 residents attended schools outside the municipality.

Troistorrents is home to the Bibliothèque communale et scolaire library. The library has (as of 2008) 11,263 books or other media, and loaned out 12,540 items in the same year. It was open a total of 320 days with average of 8 hours per week during that year.
