= Tour Sallière =

Mountain in Switzerland

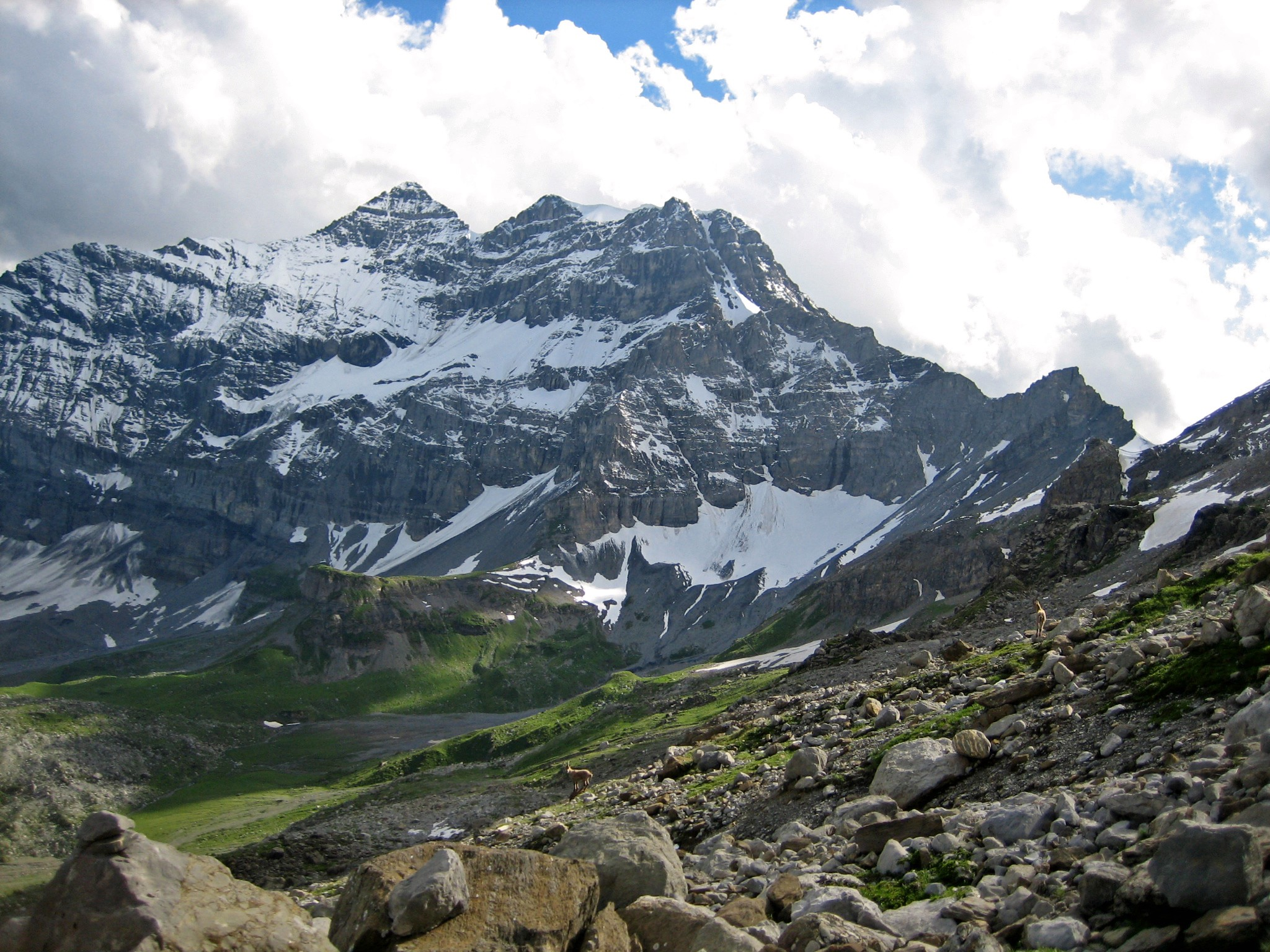

Highest point
- Elevation: 3,220 m (10,560 ft)
- Prominence: 726 m (2,382 ft)
- Parent peak: Dents du Midi (Haute Cime)
- Isolation: 3.8 km (2.4 mi)
- Listing: Alpine mountains above 3000 m
- Coordinates: 46°7′36″N 6°55′28.2″E

Geography
- Location within Switzerland
- Main peaks in Chablais Alps Mouse over (or touch) gives more detail of peaks. Location in Switzerland
- Location: Valais, Switzerland
- Parent range: Chablais Alps

The Tour Sallière (French pronunciation: [tuʁ saljɛʁ]) is a mountain of the Chablais Alps, that is overlooking the lake of Salanfe in the Swiss canton of Valais.
