= Chablais Alps =

Mountain range of the western Alps

- French: Préalpes franco-suisses
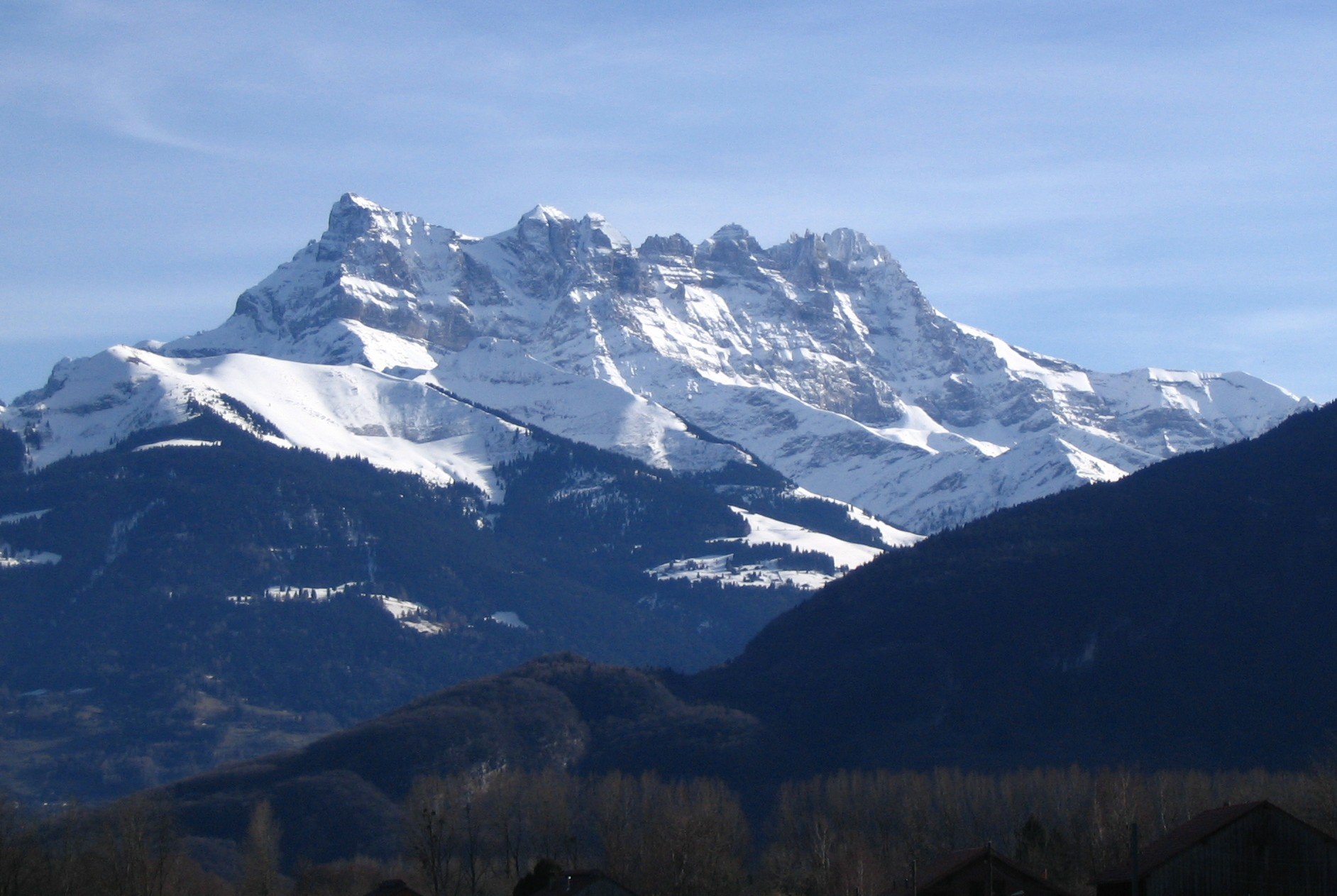
- The seven summits of the Dents du Midi

Highest point
- Peak: Dents du Midi (Haute Cime)
- Elevation: 3,257 m (10,686 ft)
- Coordinates: 46°9′45″N 6°55′25″E

Geography
- Location of the main peaks Mouse over (or touch) gives more detail of peaks.
- Countries: Switzerland and France
- Departments: Valais and Haute Savoie
- Parent range: Alps
- Borders on: Bernese Alps and Mont Blanc Massif

The Chablais Alps or Chablais Massive (French: Massif du Chablais, pronounced [masif dy ʃablɛ], [ʃable]) are a mountain range in the Western Alps. They are situated between Lake Geneva and the Mont Blanc Massif. The Col des Montets separates them from the Mont Blanc Massif in the south, and the Rhône valley separates them from the Bernese Alps in the east.

The Chablais Alps are composed of two distinct parts separated by the Val d'Illiez: the Dents du Midi massif on the south which contains the highest peaks, and the alpine foothills on the north.

== Peaks ==
The peaks of the Chablais Alps include:

Peak	Elevation (m/ft)	
Dents du Midi (Haute Cime)	3,257	10,686
Tour Sallière	3,220	10,564
Mont Ruan	3,053	10,016
Le Cheval Blanc	2,831	9,288
Le Luisin	2,786	9,140
Dents Blanches	2,759	9,052
Pointe d'Anterne	2,733	8,967
Fontanabran	2,703	8,868
Hauts-Forts	2,466	8,091
Cornettes de Bise	2,432	7,979
Dent d'Oche	2,221	7,287
Les Jumelles	2,215	7,267
Le Grammont	2,172	7,126
Pointe de l'Au	2,152	7,060
Dent du Vélan	2,059	6,755
Pointe de Bellevue	2,042	6,699
Pointe de Nyon	2,019	6,624
Pointe de Chavasse	2,012	6,601
Pointe d'Uble	1,963	6,440
Mont Billiat	1,894	6,214
Pointe d'Ireuse	1,890	6,200
Mont Ouzon	1,880	6,170
Le Môle	1,863	6,112
Grenier de Commune	1,775	5,823
Montagne des Mémises	1,674	5,492
Pointe de Miribel	1,581	5,187
Pointe des Brasses	1,502	4,928
Mont Bichet (Les Trables, previously La Crêche)	1,360	4,460
Mont Orchez	1,347	4,419
Mont de Boisy	739	2,425

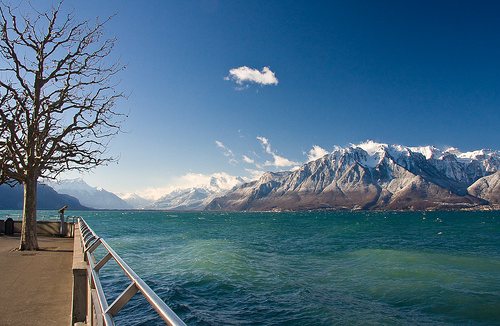
The Rhône valley on the right and the east part of the Chablais Alps on the left from across Lake Geneva

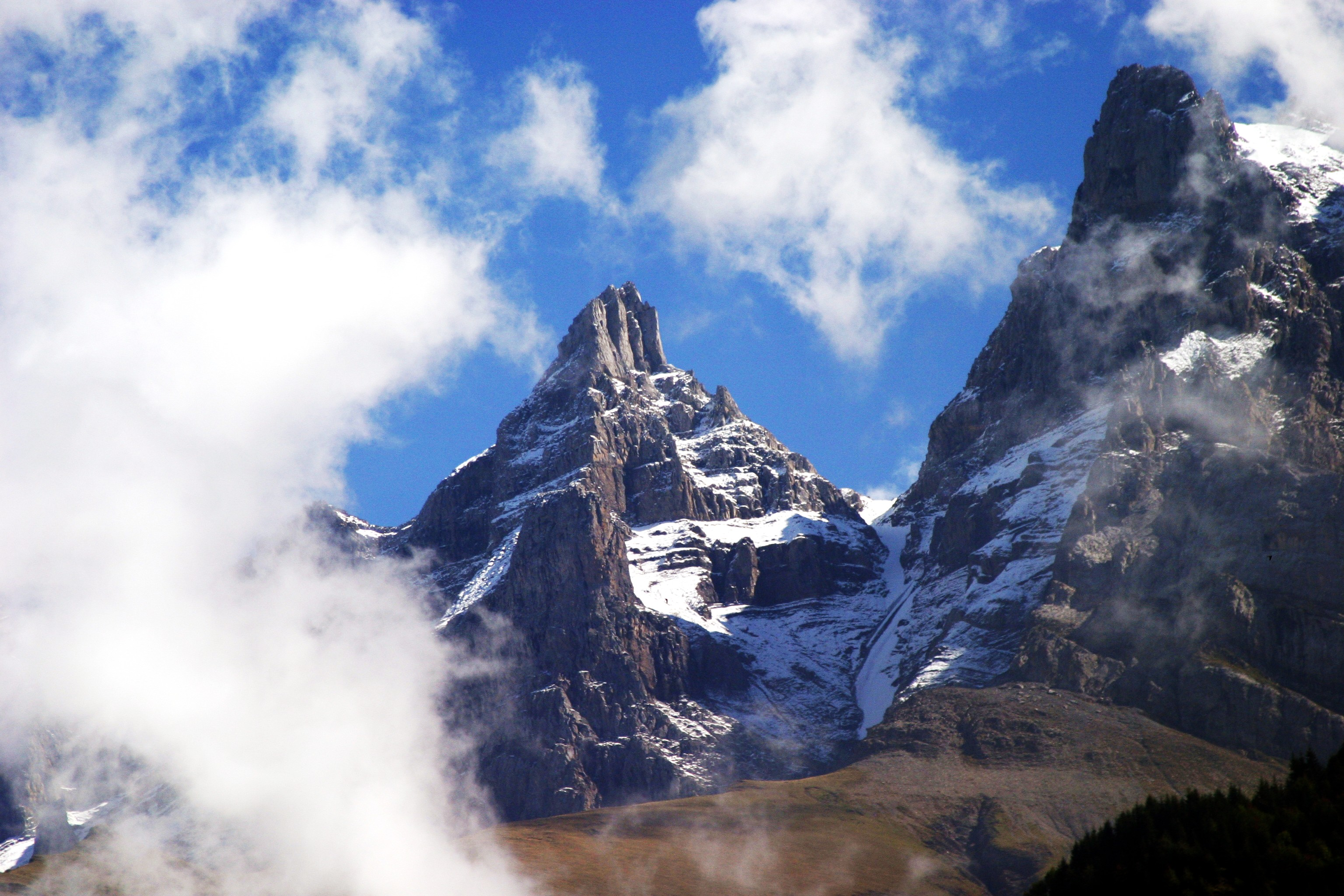
Summits of the Dents du Midi

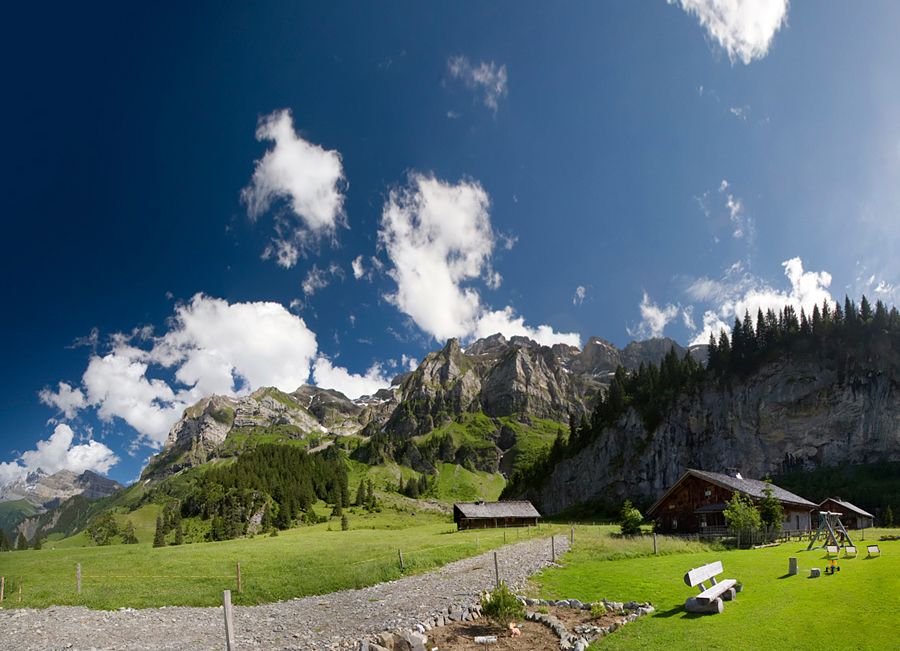
Above Champéry

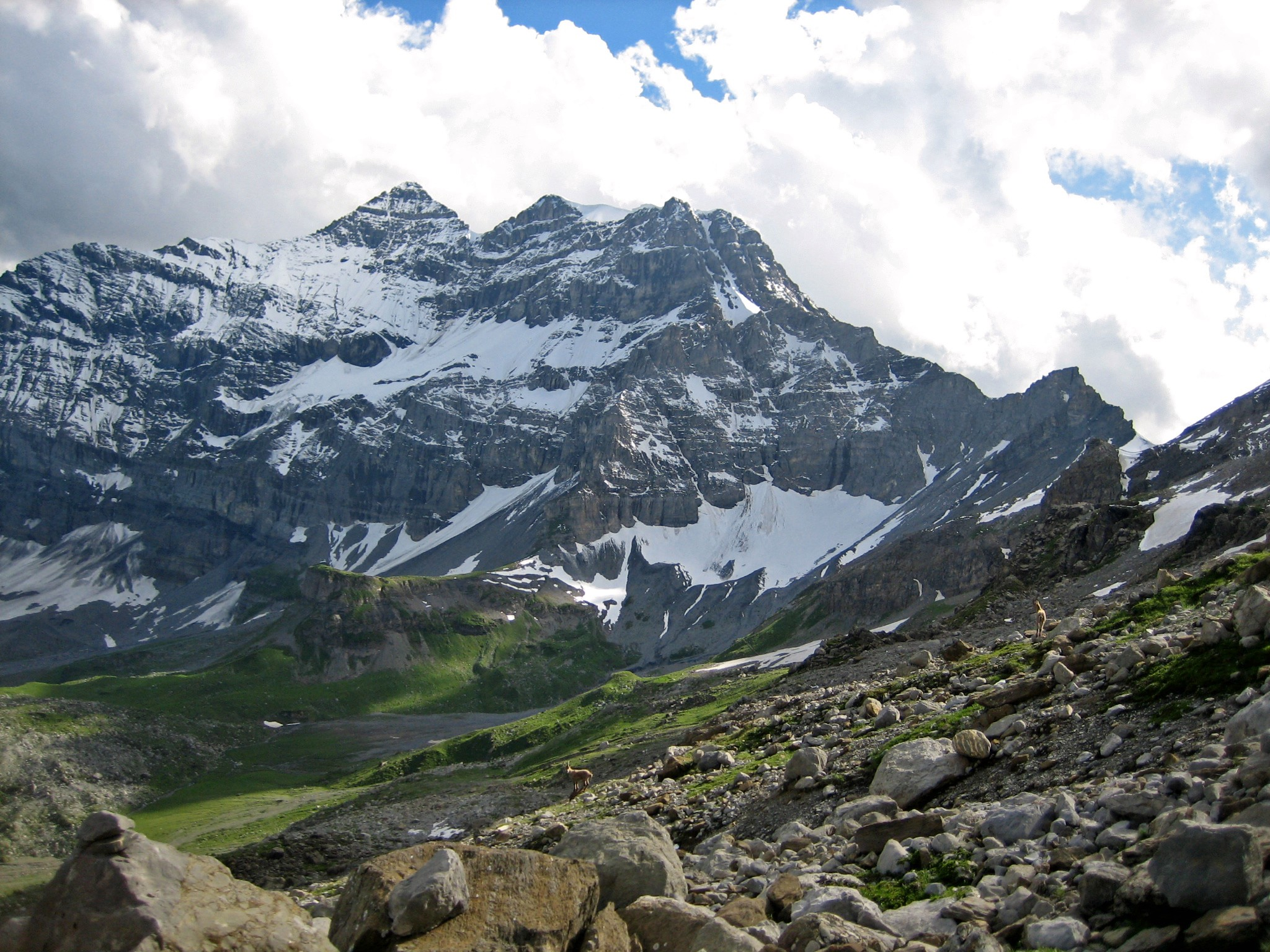
Tour Sallière

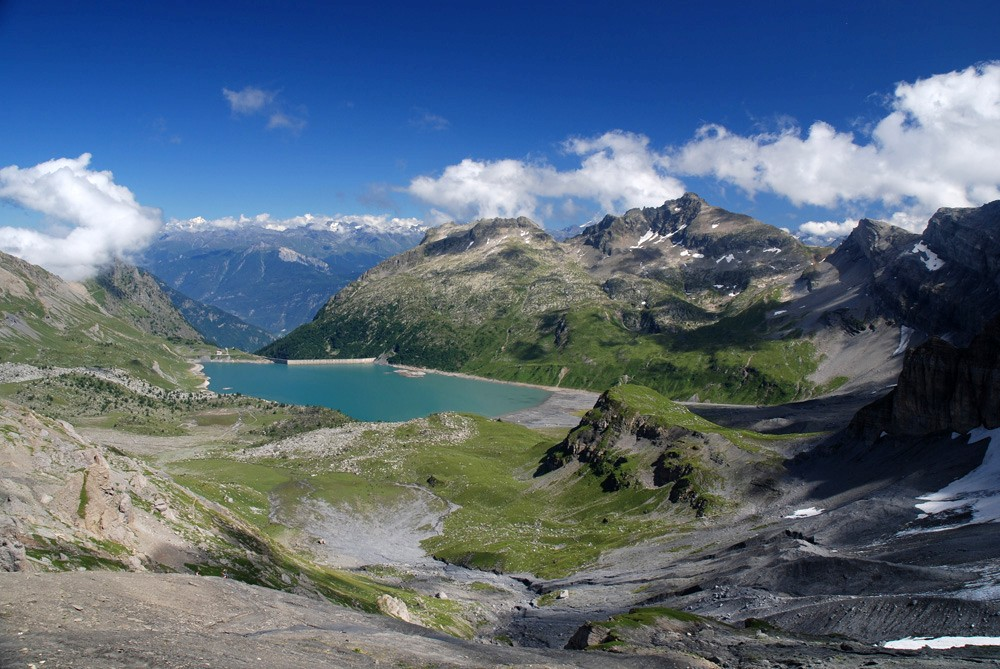
Lac de Salanfe

== See also ==
- Swiss Alps
- French Alps
