= Wolfgang Wienand =

German manager and Olympic athlete

Personal information
- Born: 22 February 1972 Cologne, Germany
- Education: HEC Paris, University of Cologne, University of Bonn
- Occupation: Chief Executive Officer of Lonza Group

Wolfgang Wienand (born 22 February 1972) is a business executive and former Olympic fencer. Since 2024, he has been chief executive officer (CEO) of Lonza Group, Swiss-based company in the contract development and manufacturing organization (CDMO) industry. He previously was chief scientific officer and then CEO at Siegfried. He competed in the individual and team foil events at the 1996 and 2000 Summer Olympics.

== Education ==
Wienand studied chemistry at the Rheinische Friedrich-Wilhelms University in Bonn and received a PhD in Organic and Bioorganic Chemistry from the University of Cologne in Germany. His studies have been supported by academic and PhD scholarships of the Studienstiftung des deutschen Volkes, Germany's national academic merit foundation, as well as the Kekulé PhD scholarship of the Fonds des VCI (Verband der Chemischen Industrie), Germany’s national chemical-industrial association. He later completed an Executive Master of Science in Finance at HEC Paris in France.

== Professional career ==
Wienand joined Lonza Group in July 2024 as CEO. He has led the strategic transformation of Lonza into a pure-play CDMO, including the divestment of the Capsules & Health Ingredients business and the introduction of the company's streamlined operating model under the One Lonza strategy.

Since 2023, he has been a Non-Executive Director on the Board of Mettler-Toledo International.

Wienand was CEO of Siegfried from 2019 to 2024. Earlier, he was Chief Scientific Officer and then Chief Strategy Officer in Siegfried's executive leadership team. Prior to joining Siegfried in 2010, he held a series of positions with increasing seniority at Evonik Industries AG.

== Sports career ==
As a foil fencer, Wienand was a long-standing member of the national fencing team of Germany and the German Olympic teams of Atlanta 1996 and Sydney 2000. He won the World Youth Championships in 1989 in Lisbon. He finished in 4th place at the 1996 Summer Olympics in Atlanta and won the bronze medal at the 1999 World Fencing Championships in Seoul. He came second in the individual competition at the 1998 European Fencing Championships in Plovdiv, where he also won the European championship with Germany's men's foil team, as well as winning the World Cup Series in 1997. Wienand was ranked number one in the world and won seven World Cups and several German National Championships.

Since 1991, his coach was Frank-Eberhard Höltje, later the German national coach for the men's foil, who had previously served as national coach of the GDR men's junior foil team and competed as a sabre fencer at the 1980 Summer Olympics in Moscow. Previously Wienand was coached by Manfred Kaspar, former German national coach for epee and sports director of the German national fencing association. His home club is the Olympic Fencing Club (OFC) Bonn.

Wienand was a leading figure in the German national team. He finished his career in sports after the 2000 Summer Olympics to complete his PhD and to start over with his professional career in the chemical-pharmaceutical industry.

== Awards ==
- Germany's fencer of the year 1996
- Germany's junior fencer of the year 1989
