= Lonza Group =

Swiss pharmaceutical and biotech company

Lonza Group AG

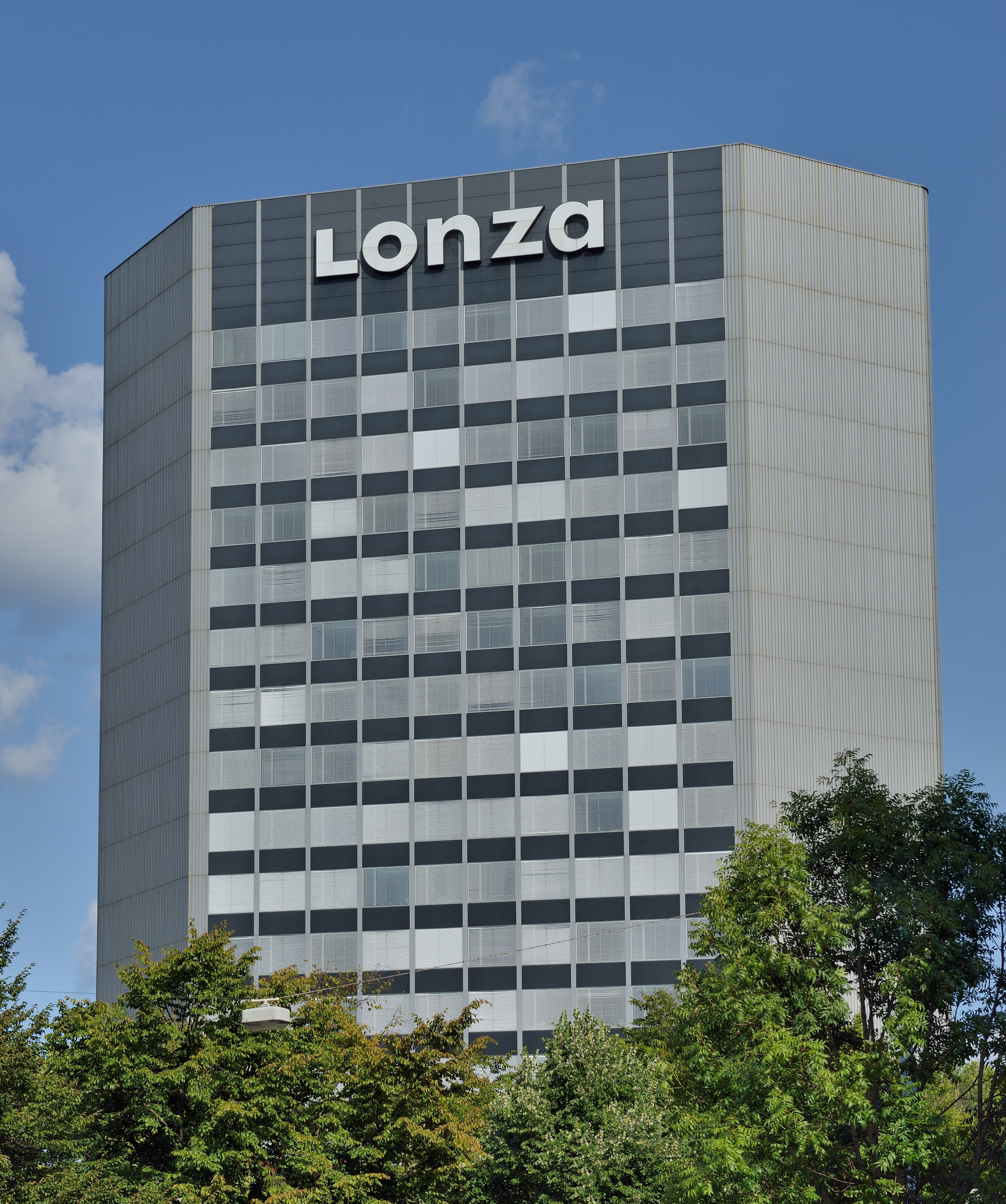
- Lonza Tower in Basel, Switzerland
- Company type: Aktiengesellschaft
- Traded as: SIX: LONN; SGX: O6Z; SMI component
- ISIN: CH0013841017
- Industry: Pharmaceuticals; biotechnology
- Founded: 1897; 129 years ago
- Headquarters: Basel, Switzerland
- Key people: Jean-Marc Huët (chairman); Wolfgang Wienand (CEO)
- Products: Biopharmaceuticals
- Revenue: ▲CHF 6.72 billion (2023)
- Operating income: ▼CHF 880 million (2023)
- Net income: ▼CHF 655 million (2023)
- Total assets: ▼CHF 16.8 billion (2023)
- Total equity: ▼CHF 9.51 billion (2023)
- Number of employees: 18,000 (2023)
- Website: lonza.com

Lonza Group AG is a Swiss multinational manufacturing company for the pharmaceutical, biotechnology and nutrition sectors, headquartered in Basel, with major facilities in Europe, North America and South Asia. Lonza was established under that name in the late 19th-century in Switzerland. The company provides product development services to the pharmaceutical and biologic industries, including custom manufacturing of biopharmaceuticals and detection systems and services for the bioscience sector.

== History ==
Lonza was founded in 1897 in the small Swiss town of Gampel, situated in the canton of Valais, taking its name from the nearby river. In the course of the 20th century Lonza evolved from hydroelectricity and C2 chemistry, through nitrogen chemistry to petrochemistry before moving into fine chemistry and biochemistry.

Initially, the company produced electricity. Lonza moved to neighbouring Visp (where it retains a production site today) in 1909. Competition from electric lighting reduced demand for calcium carbide and in 1915 Lonza started industrial production of calcium cyanamide which became popular as a cheap nitrogenous fertiliser, only to be supplanted by urea. In 1923, Lonza started to convert calcium carbide to metaldehyde (sold as a solid fuel under the brand 'Meta' and then slug repellant) via acetylene and acetaldehyde. In 1925, ammonia production was started, with a process licensed from Casale. With calcium cyanamide and calcium nitrate (made from nitric acid), Lonza commercialised formulated fertilisers starting in the 1930s. At the start of World War II, Lonza was contracted by the Swiss government to produce synthetic fuel, which it did by converting acetaldehyde to paraldehyde, used as an additive in transport fuel.

Lonza is involved in the manufacturing of biologics with several pharmaceutical companies. Lonza entered into a partnership with Teva in 2009 to develop and manufacture biosimilars. In 2010, they made a deal with GlaxoSmithKline to manufacture therapeutic monoclonal antibodies. In 2014, Lonza entered into an agreement with Bristol-Myers Squibb to manufacture two biologic drugs. Lonza also manufactures Imbruvica for Pharmacyclics and Mydicar for Celladon. In 2015, Lonza contracted with Alexion to construct a new facility dedicated to Alexion manufacturing. In 2017, Lonza and Sanofi partnered to construct a new facility for production of biologics. Lonza entered into cell and gene therapy with the acquisition of Houston-based Vivante GMP Solutions in 2010.

In November 2019, Chairman Albert Baehny became both chairman and interim CEO of Lonza after chief executive officer (CEO) Marc Funk left after 9 months. In November 2020, Pierre-Alain Ruffieux commenced his role as Chief Executive Officer which ended at the end of September 2023, totaling 2 years and 11 months in the position of CEO. Chairman Albert Baehny became again, both chairman and interim CEO, as from October 2023.

In May 2020, Moderna struck a manufacturing deal with Lonza to produce its (mRNA-1273) COVID-19 vaccine active ingredient while expanding sterile production and fill-finish activities to 500 million doses starting in 2021. Production of the mRNA bulk vaccine started in January 2021, soon after an official visit by Swiss Federal Councilor Alain Berset. Lonza Group was responsible for the global production of two-thirds of the raw materials for the Moderna vaccine at combined U.S. and Swiss facilities.

In May 2024, Jean-Marc Huët was elected Chairman following the retirement of Albert Baehny, who had held the position of Chairman and interim CEO. In July 2024, Wolfgang Wienand commenced his role as CEO of Lonza.

== Business operations ==
As of 2023, Lonza had over thirty development and manufacturing sites located in countries including Switzerland, the United States, the United Kingdom, Belgium, Spain, France, Mexico, Brazil, Japan, India, China and Singapore.

The presence in India was established in Genome Valley, where ground was broken in 2011. In 2018, Lonza opened a 300,000 square feet (28,000 m^{2}) facility focused on cell and gene therapy in the United States in Pearland, Texas (a suburb of Houston). In 2023, Lonza Group acquired Synaffix to strengthen its antibody-drug conjugate capacity. In October 2024, the company completed the acquisition of the Genentech biologics manufacturing site in Vacaville, California, from Roche.

As of 2023, the company employed approximately 18,000 people across more than 30 locations.

In 2024, Lonza announced plans to streamline its operations by exiting the capsules and health ingredients sector. The decision follows a decrease in demand for pharmaceutical supplies after the COVID-19 pandemic. While the shift is expected to result in non-cash write-downs, analysts believe it will enhance Lonza’s growth prospects and financial stability. The divestment process, targeting a segment responsible for 17% of the company’s 2023 revenue, will begin this year. Lonza intends to focus on its core business as a contract development and manufacturing organization (CDMO). Notably, the company is the global leader in producing monoclonal antibodies, a key technology behind new Alzheimer’s treatments. Bernstein analyst Justin Smith praised the move as a step toward “operational simplification,” highlighting Lonza’s new business focus on three platforms: integrated biologics, advanced synthesis, and specialized modalities.
