= Synaffix =

Dutch biotechnology company

Synaffix BV
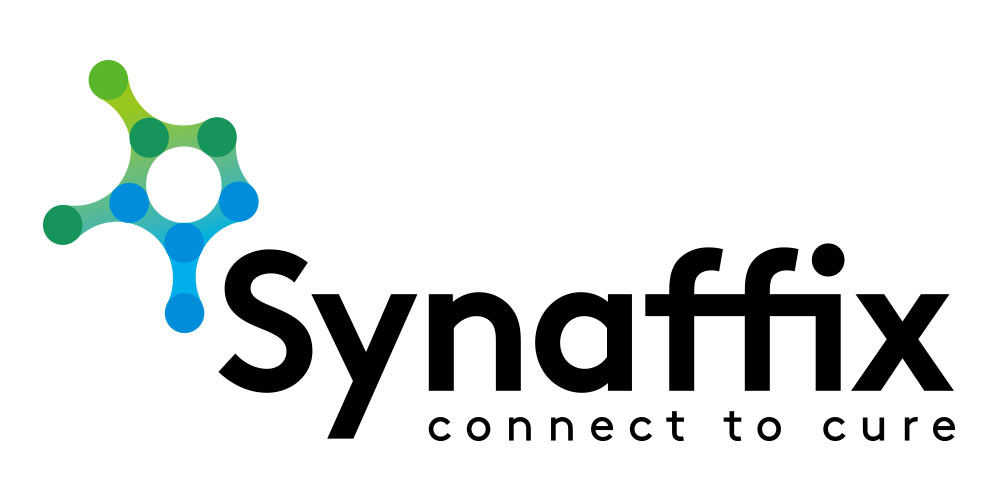

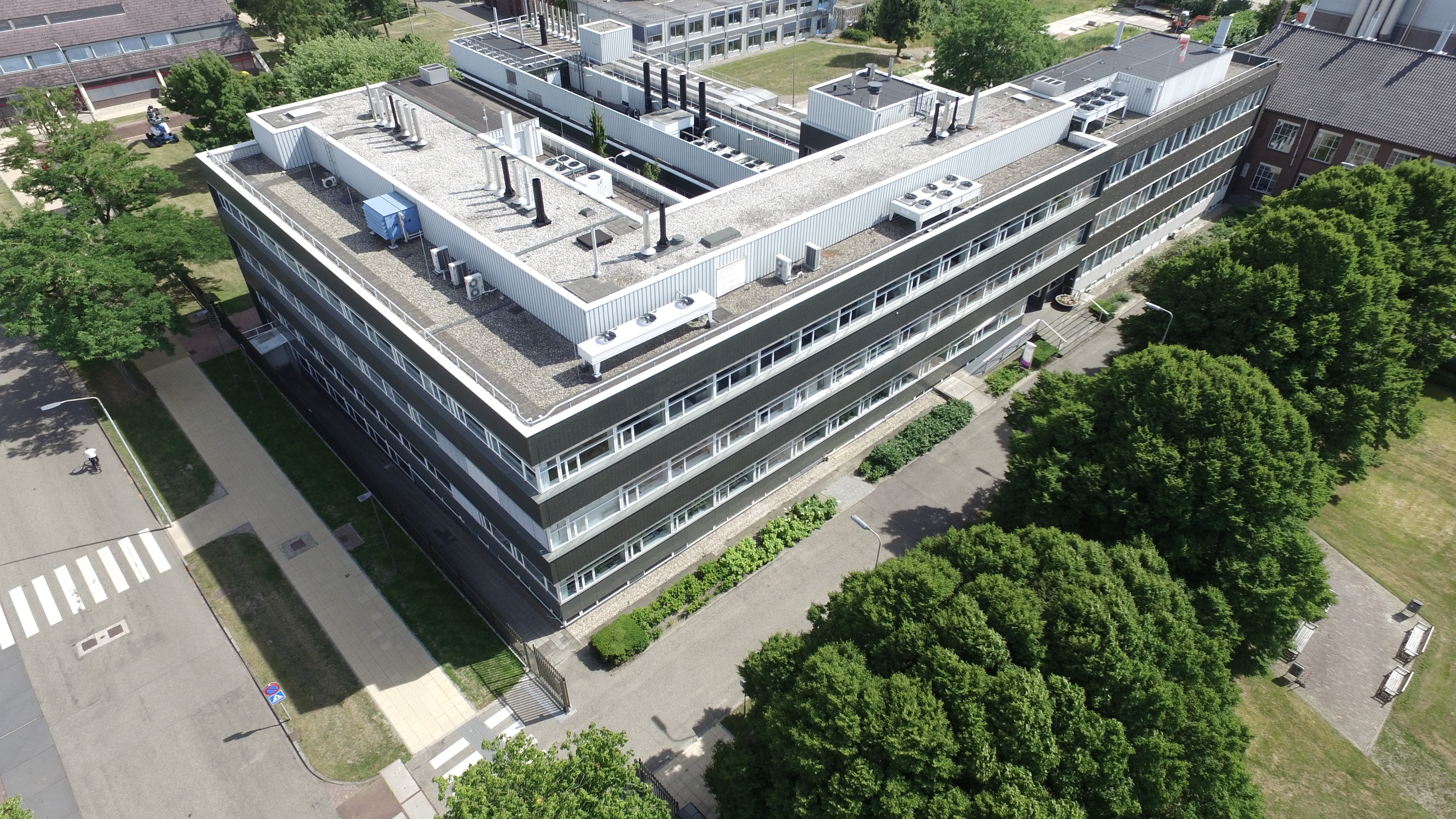
- Synaffix R&D facility
- Company type: Private
- Industry: Biotechnology
- Founded: 2010 with capital investments from Aravis, BioGeneration Ventures, BOM Capital and Merck Ventures
- Founders: Prof. Dr. Floris van Delft and Dr. Sander van Berkel
- Headquarters: Oss, Netherlands
- Website: http://www.synaffix.com

Synaffix is a Dutch biotechnology company headquartered in the Netherlands that has developed a clinical-stage platform technology for antibody-drug conjugates (ADCs), primarily used for cancer treatment. ADCs utilize potent small molecule payloads, similar to those used in chemotherapy, but are designed to target only cancer cells, sparing normal, healthy tissues.

The proprietary technology of Synaffix was developed to enable the treatment of a wide variety of cancer types and is designed to significantly enhance effectiveness while improving the safety and tolerability of these targeted cancer therapeutics.

Benchmarking studies consistently demonstrate that, with a given antibody and ADC payload, ADCs produced using Synaffix technology display significantly enhanced effectiveness, tolerability, and safety compared to all three major clinical-stage ADC technologies. The most advanced ADC employing Synaffix technology was given to the first cancer patients in 2018.

In October 2016, Synaffix made the first public disclosure of its commercial license agreement with ADC Therapeutics Sarl (ADCT). Under the terms of the agreement, ADCT may develop one or multiple products using Synaffix technology. In October 2017, Synaffix announced that ADC Therapeutics had triggered a second target-specific license under their existing deal from 2016 to develop a second ADC product candidate using Synaffix technology. Beyond this, ADC Therapeutics retains an option to obtain a limited number of additional single-target licenses for their potential future programs.

Synaffix secured granted patents covering its ADC technology that offer end-to-end protection for resulting therapeutic products through at least 2035.

Synaffix was founded in 2010, based on inventions made in the field of copper-free click chemistry at Radboud University in Nijmegen. Subsequently, this chemistry was combined with the use of enzymatic antibody modification to facilitate the generation of targeted cancer therapeutics.

In 2023, Synaffix was acquired by Lonza Group.
