= Church of St. Théodule, Sion =

Roman Catholic church in Sion, Switzerland

Church of St. Théodule
- Église Saint-Théodule (French)
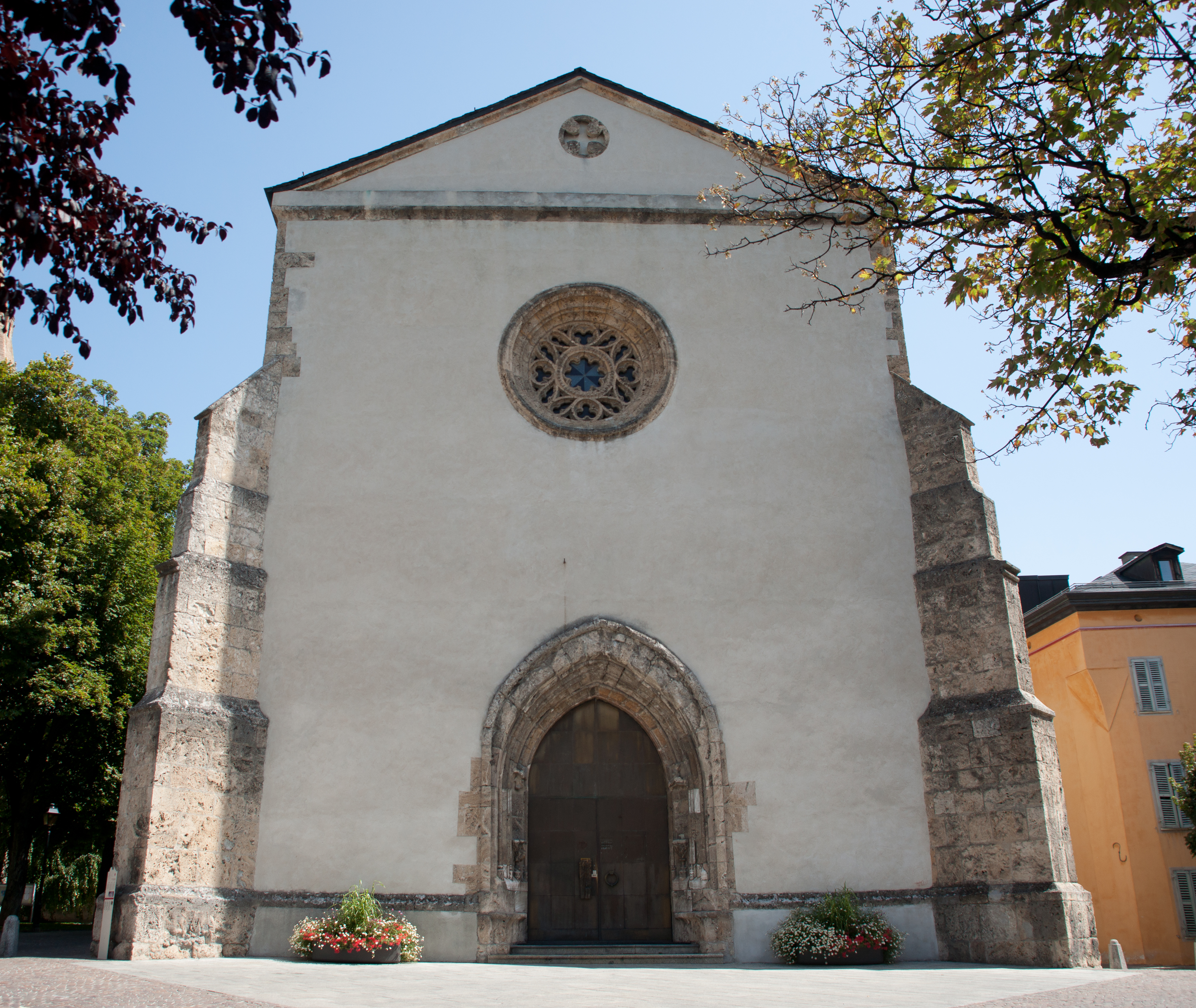

- Location within Switzerland Location within Canton of Valais
- 46°14′01″N 07°21′32″E
- Type: Roman Catholic church
- Location: Sion, Valais, Switzerland

History
- Built: 1514–1516

Site notes
- Architectural style: Flamboyant Gothic

Swiss Cultural Property of National Significance
- Official name: Église St-Théodule
- Criteria: Category A
- Reference no.: 7038

The Church of St. Théodule (French: église Saint-Théodule; German: St. Theodul) is a Roman Catholic church located in Sion in the canton of Valais, Switzerland.

== Location ==
The church is located in the historic center of Sion, south from the Cathedral of Our Lady of Sion.

== History ==
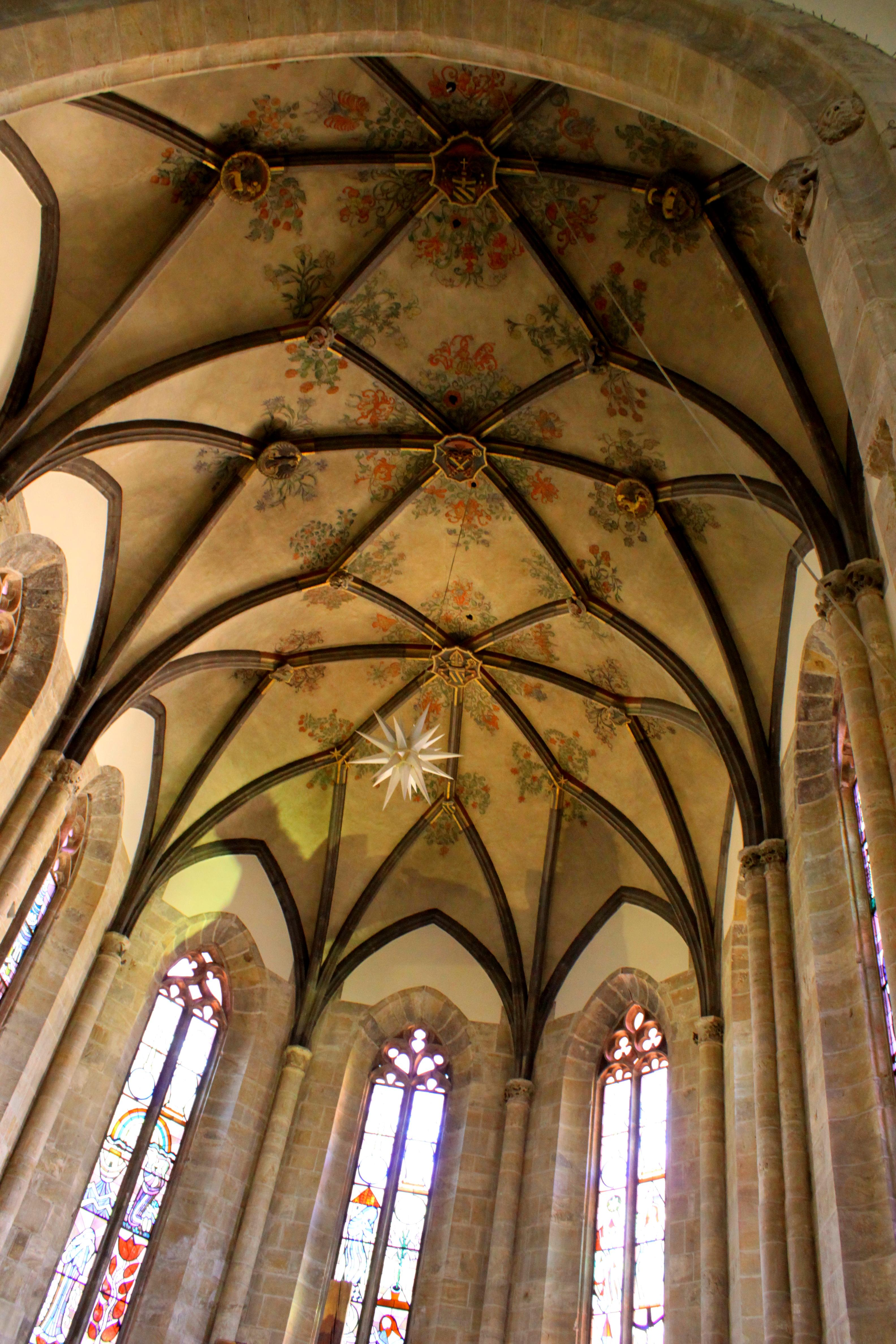
Choir vault

The first church on the site was built during the High Middle Ages on the ruins of a Roman bath. The current building was built from 1514 to 1516 on the site of a former building. The vault of the choir (before 1502 – finished in 1514), symbolic of the Flamboyant Gothic style, was made by a builder from Valsesia who was identified with Ulrich Ruffiner, perhaps erroneously. The nave was vaulted in 1644 by Adrien III of Reidmatten. The church was renovated in 1960–64.

The church was listed among the Cultural Property of National Significance.

== Description ==
The church has a single nave and a polygonal choir. The buttresses which support the nave have niches and canopies for statues, though most have been removed. A small stair tower is built into the southern wall on the western end of the church.

== See also ==
- List of cultural property of national significance in Switzerland: Valais
