= Valais =

Canton of Switzerland

Canton of Valais Canton du Valais (French) Kanton Wallis (German)
- Canton
- Flag Coat of arms Brandmark
- Anthem: Notre Valais/Wallis, unser Heimatland ("Our Valais/Wallis, our homeland")
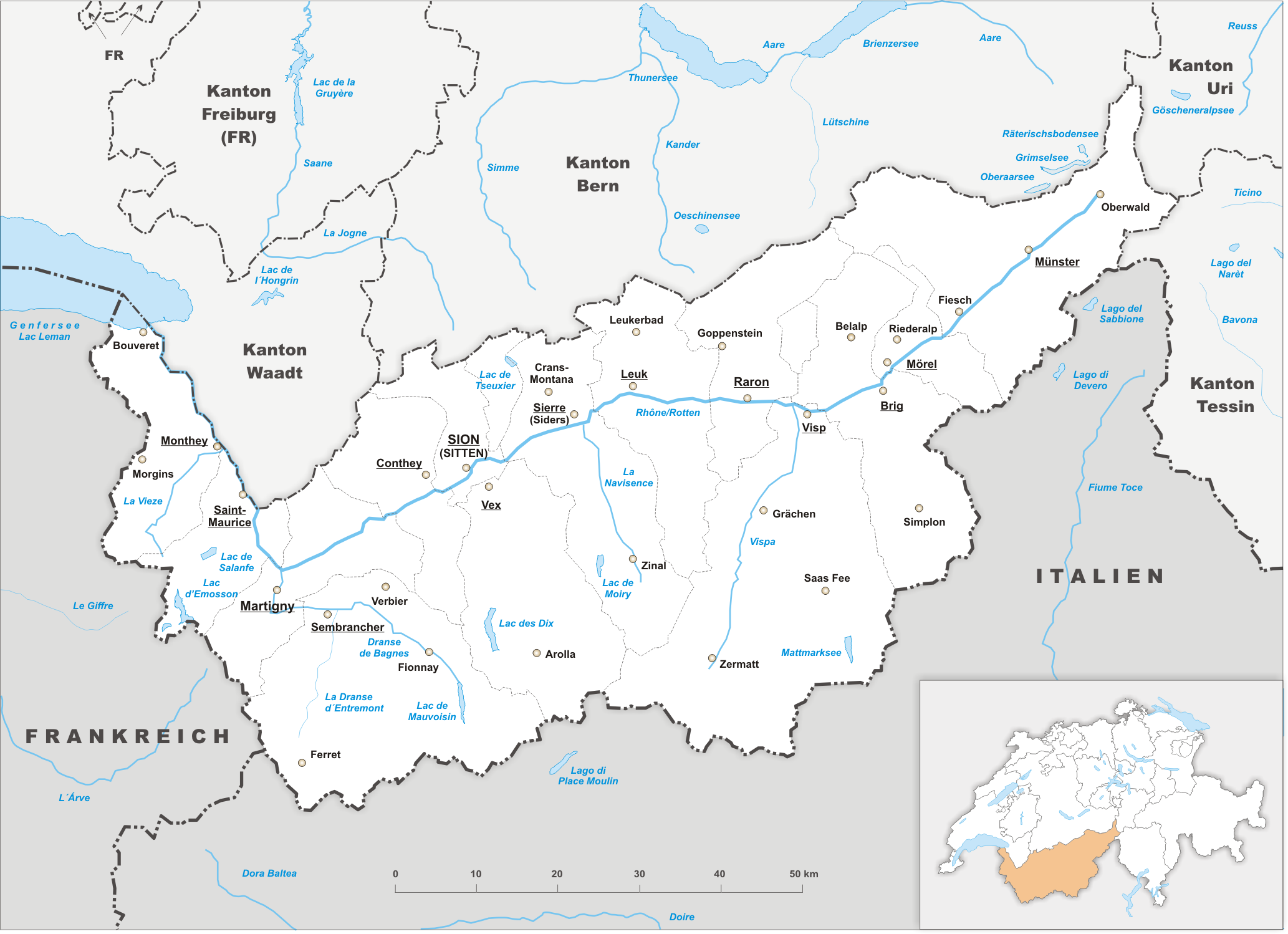
- Location in Switzerland Map of Valais
- Coordinates: 46.275°N 7.500°E
- Capital: Sion
- Subdivisions: 122 municipalities, 13 districts

Government
  - President: Mathias Reynard
  - Executive: State Council (5)
  - Legislative: Grand Council (130)

Area
  - Total: 5,224.49 km^{2} (2,017.19 sq mi)

Population (December 2020)
  - Total: 348,503
  - Density: 66.7056/km^{2} (172.767/sq mi)

GDP
  - Total: CHF 19.194 billion (2020)
  - Per capita: CHF 55,313 (2020)
- ISO 3166 code: CH-VS
- Highest point: 4,634 m (15,203 ft): Monte Rosa
- Lowest point: 372 m (1,220 ft): Lake Geneva
- Joined: 1815
- Languages: French, German
- Website: www.vs.ch

Valais (UK: /ˈvæleɪ/ VAL-ay, US: /væˈleɪ/ val-AY; French: [valɛ]), (Note: Arpitan: Valês; German: Wallis [ˈvalɪs]) more formally, the Canton of Valais or Wallis, (Note: French: Canton du Valais; German: Kanton Wallis; Arpitan: Canton du Valês; in other official Swiss languages outside Valais: Italian: (Canton) Vallese [valˈleːze, -eːse]; Romansh: (Chantun) Vallais.) is one of the 26 cantons forming the Swiss Confederation. It is composed of thirteen districts and its capital and largest city is Sion.

Valais is situated in the southwestern part of the country. It borders the cantons of Vaud and Bern to the north, the cantons of Uri and Ticino to the east, as well as Italy to the south and France to the west. It is one of the three large southern Alpine cantons, along with Ticino and Grisons. It is a bilingual canton, French and German being its two official languages. Traditionally, the canton is divided into Lower, Central, and Upper Valais, the last region constituting the German-speaking minority.

Valais is essentially coextensive with the valley of the Rhône from its headwaters to Lake Geneva, separating the Pennine Alps from the Bernese Alps, the two largest mountain ranges of the canton. A major wine region, the canton is simultaneously one of the driest regions of Switzerland in its central Rhône valley and among the wettest, having large amounts of snow and rain upon the highest peaks found in Switzerland, such as Monte Rosa and the Finsteraarhorn. Although a major hydroelectricity producer, Valais is essentially renowned for its tourism industry and its numerous Alpine resort towns, notably Crans-Montana, Saas Fee, Verbier, and Zermatt. Overlooking the latter town, the Matterhorn has become an iconic landmark of the canton.

In 1529, Valais became an associate member of the Swiss Confederation. After having resisted the Protestant Reformation and remained faithful to the Roman Catholic Church, it became a republic under the guidance of the prince-bishop of Sion in 1628. In 1815, Valais finally entered the Swiss Confederation as a canton. In 1878, the Simplon Railway connected most of Valais with the cities of the Swiss Plateau. The canton was further opened up by the Lötschberg Railway in 1913.

== Name ==
The canton is also officially referred to by its long name République et canton du Valais (French) or Republik und Kanton Wallis (German). This translates into Republic and Canton of Valais. The canton is often referred to with the definitive article ("the Valais") in French and German (le Valais, das Wallis).

== History ==
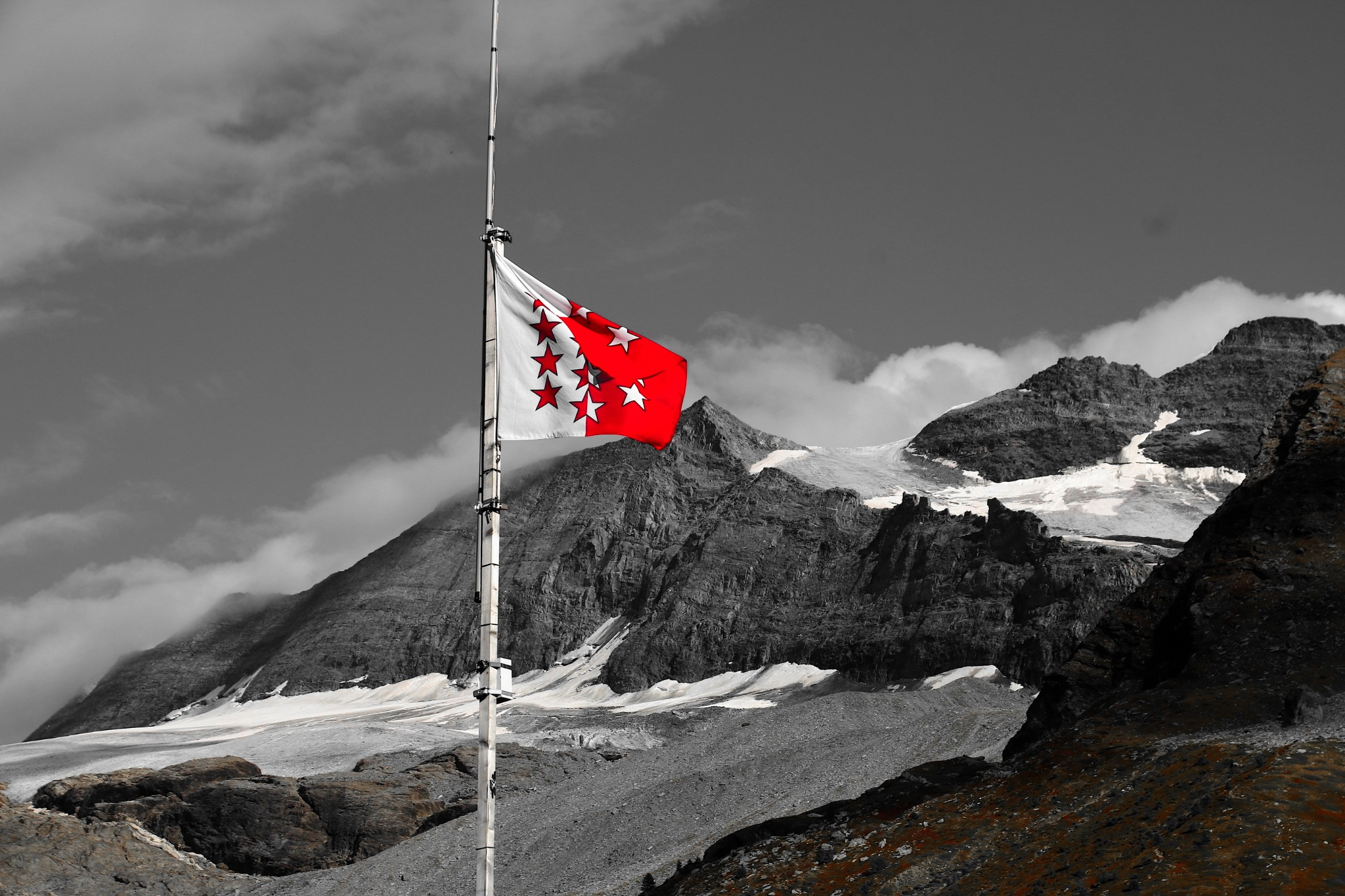
Flag of Canton Valais

The Romans called the upper Rhône valley Vallis Poenina. The Vallis Poenina was conquered by the Romans after the Battle of Octodurus (now known as Martigny) in 57 BC and became part of the Gallo-Roman cultural sphere. According to a tradition that can be traced back to the middle of the 8th century, the Theban legion was martyred at Agaunum (now Saint Maurice) about 285 or 302. From 888 onwards the lands were part of the kingdom of Jurane Burgundy.

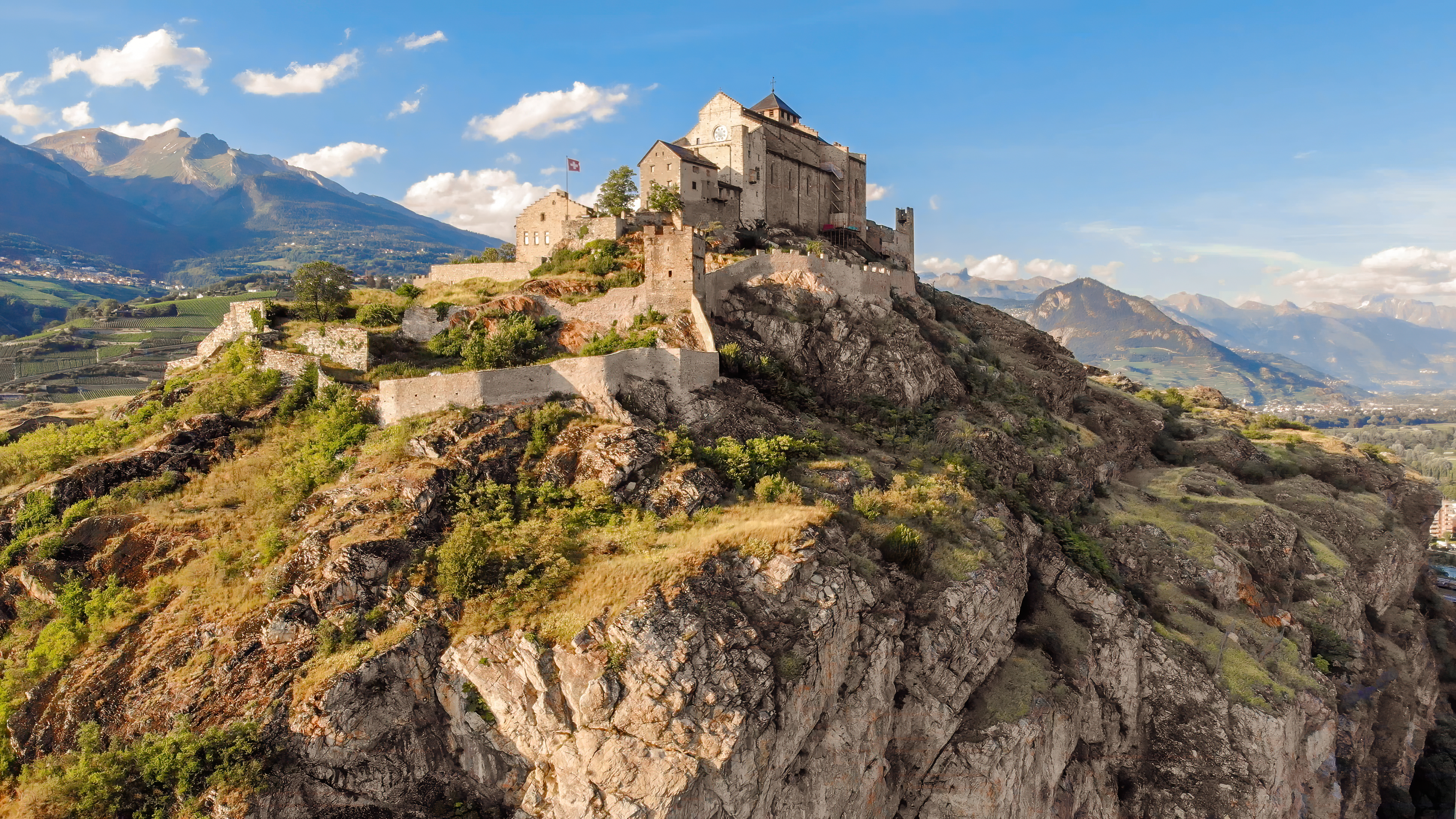
Valère Basilica dominating the Rhône Valley. By the 12th century, the bishops of Sion began building churches and castles in Sion to represent their power and administer their estates.

Valais formed part of the kingdom of Transjurane Burgundy, which fell to the Holy Roman Empire in 1032. It became part of the duchy of Burgundia Minor, which was held by the emperors by the house of Zähringen (which became extinct in 1218). In 999, King Rudolph III of Burgundy gave all temporal rights and privileges to the Bishop of Sion, who was later styled praefect and count of Valais and is still a prince of the Holy Roman Empire. The count-bishops then struggled to defend their area against the Zähringer and then the dukes of Savoy, so that the medieval history of Valais is inextricably linked with that of the diocese of Sion. The Dukes of Savoy, however, succeeded in winning most of the land west of Sion (Lower Valais), while in the upper part of the valley (Upper Valais) there were many feudal lords, such as the lords of Raron, those of La Tour-Châtillon, and the counts of Visp.

About the middle of the 13th century, the large communities (Zenden or tithings) began to develop independence and grow in power. The name Zenden or tithings probably came from a very ancient division of the bishop's manors for administrative and judicial purposes. In the same century the upper part of the valley was colonized by Germans from Hasli (de) in the Canton of Bern. The locals became German-speaking, though many Romance local names remain. In 1354 the liberties of several of the seven Zenden (Sion, Sierre, Leuk, Raron, Visp, Brig and Conches) were confirmed by the Emperor Charles IV.

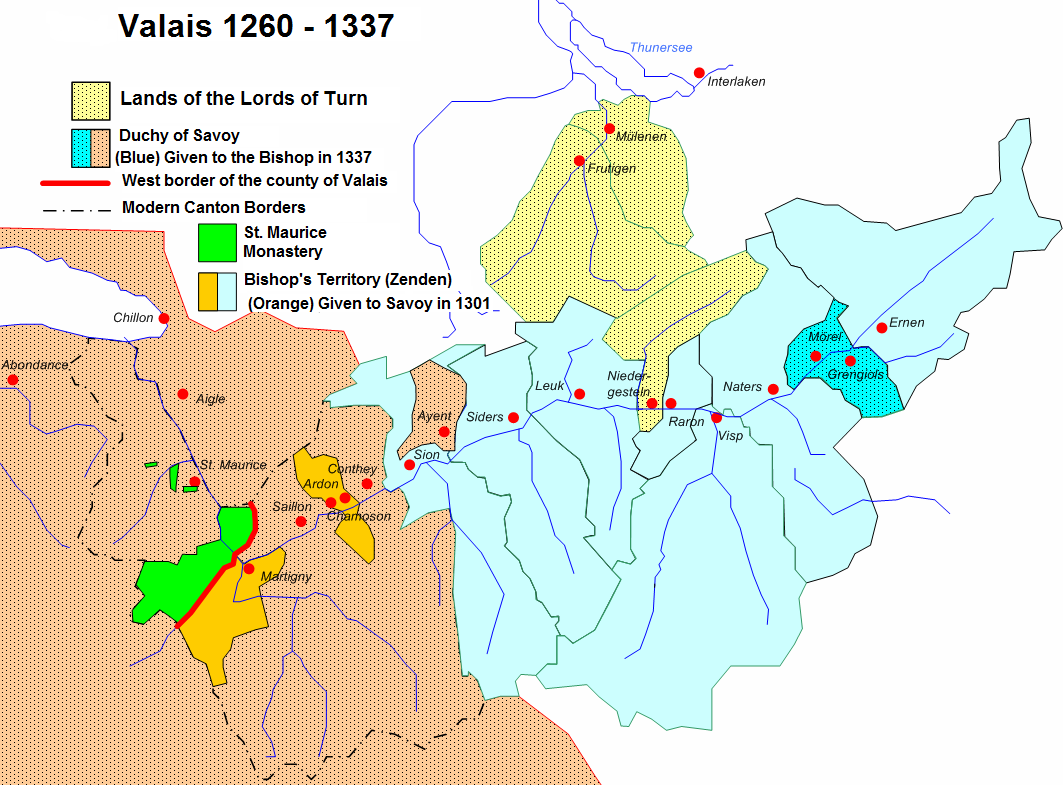
Valais in 1300

By the late 14th century, the counts of Savoy acquired the bishopric of Sion. The Zenden resisted his attempts to gather both spiritual and secular power in the valley. In 1375–76, Zenden forces defeated the army of the house of La Tour-Chatillon, and in 1388 routed the forces of the bishop, the count, and his nobles at Visp. The German-speaking Zenden spread further into the valley. Starting in 1384 the Morge stream (a little below Sion) was recognized as the boundary between Savoyard, French-speaking Lower Valais and German-speaking episcopal Upper Valais.

During the Raron affair rebellion from 1414 to 1420, some cantons of the Swiss Confederation took sides in the conflict. Lucerne, Uri and Unterwalden supported the Upper Valais rebels, while Bern supported the noble Raron family. The uprising was successful in driving out the Rarons and almost brought the Confederation to civil war.

Following the Raron affair, the canton was the location of the Valais witch trials between 1428 and 1447 in which at least 367 men and women were put to death. This event marks one of the earliest witch scares in late medieval Europe. The phenomenon later spread to other parts of the continent.

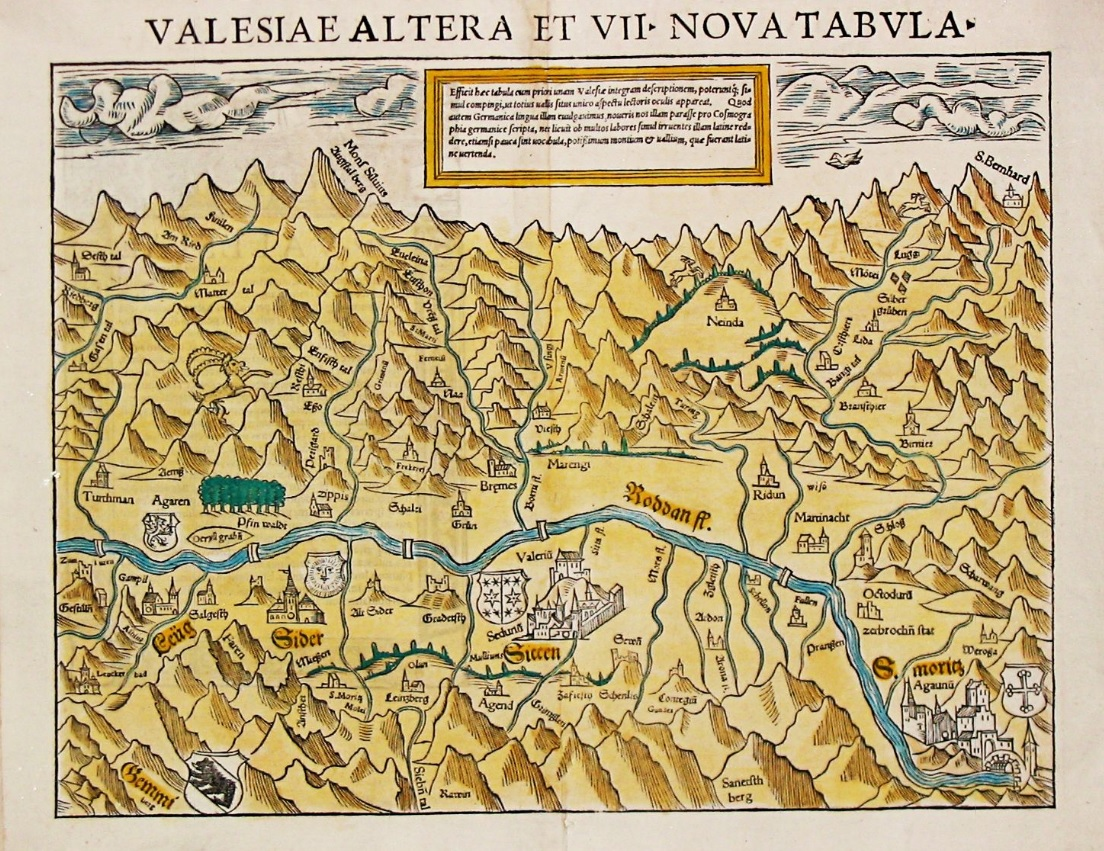
Earliest known map of Valais, drawn by Johannes Schalbetter in 1545. Looking south, only the lower portion of the valley from Leuk to Saint-Maurice is depicted.

With the election of Walther II. Supersaxo von der Fluhe (from Conches) as bishop in 1457, the German-speaking part of the valley finally attained supremacy. At the outbreak of the Burgundian Wars in 1475, the bishop of Sion and the Zenden made a treaty with Bern. In November of the same year, they seized all Lower or Savoyard Valais up to Martigny. In March 1476, after the victory of Grandson, they advanced and captured St Maurice, Évian, Thonon and Monthey. They had to give up the last three districts in 1477 but won them again in 1536. In the treaty of Thonon in 1569, Monthey, Val-d'llliez, and Le Bouveret were permanently annexed to Valais. These conquered districts in the Lower Valais were ruled as subject lands by the bishop and the Tithings of the Upper Valais until 1798. On 12 March 1529, Valais became an associate member (Zugewandter Ort) of the Swiss Confederation.

In the early 17th century, the aristocratic governors of the districts in the Upper Valais pressured the prince-bishop of Sion to abdicate secular power, which was achieved temporarily in 1613 and then permanently in 1634, when the country became the federal Republic of the Seven Tithings under the rule of a Landeshauptmann. The republic in its original form existed until 1798, when the districts of the Lower Valais, until then ruled as subjects, successfully revolted against the Seven Tithings and achieved equal status within the republic. During the French invasion of the Swiss Confederacy in the same year, Valais was incorporated into the Helvetic Republic until 1802 when it became the separate Rhodanic Republic.

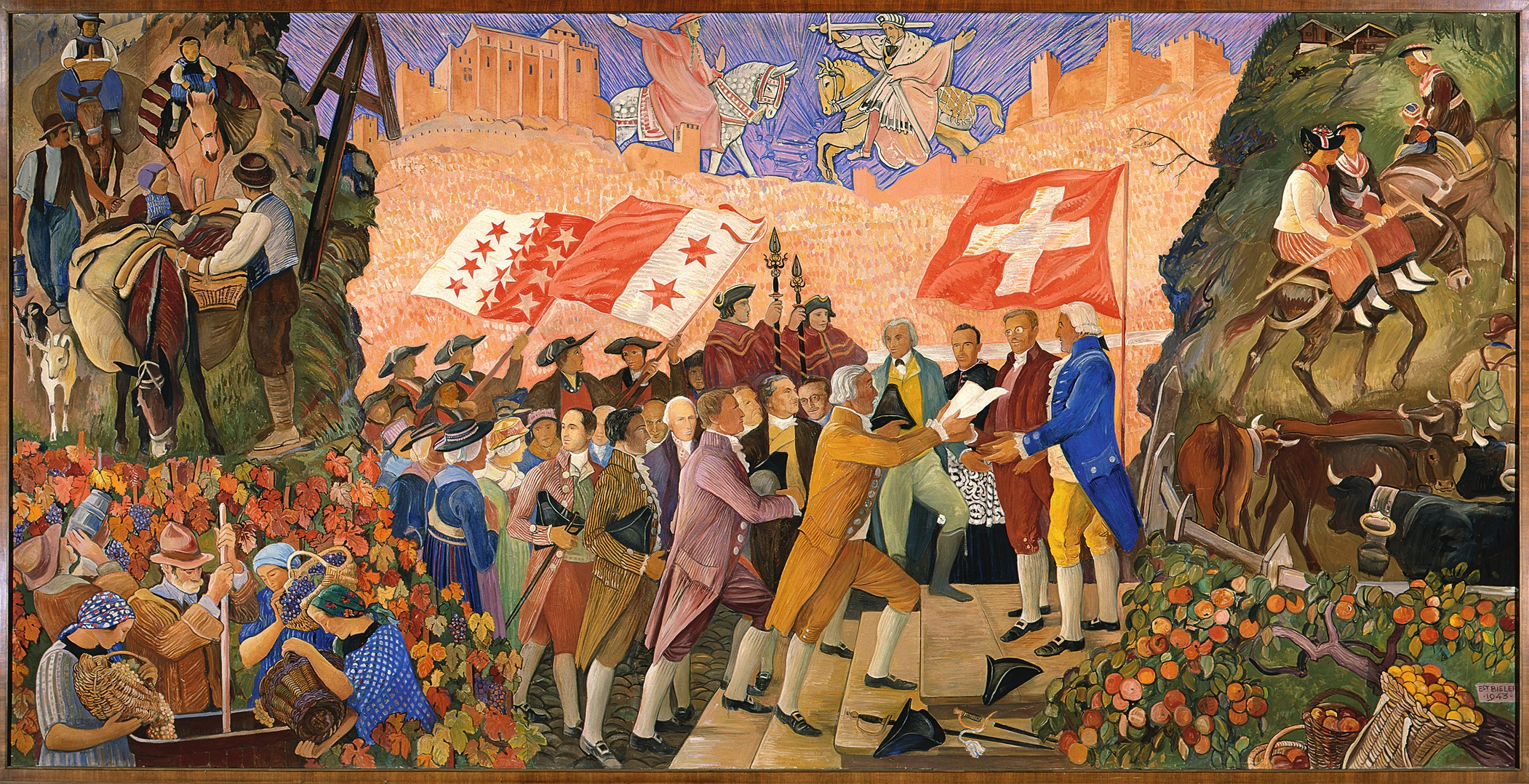
Valais Joins the Confederation by Ernest Biéler (1944)

In 1810, the Rhodanic Republic was annexed by the First French Empire as the departement of Simplon. The department was occupied by Austrian troops in late 1813; on 4 August 1815, Valais finally entered the Swiss Confederation as a canton. In 1845, Valais joined the Catholic separatist league (Sonderbund) which led to what is called the Sonderbund War. Under General Henri Dufour, 99,000 Swiss Federal troops were faced by 79,000 Separatists, but in the end, Valais chose not to fight.

The beginning of the modern history of Valais essentially coincides with the exploration of the High Alps, the first ascent of the Matterhorn in 1865 marking the end of the golden age of alpinism. The boom of tourism followed in the late 19th century. In 1878, the Simplon Railway connected Brig, the last town before the Simplon Pass, from Lausanne and Geneva and other major cities of the Swiss Plateau.

== Geography ==
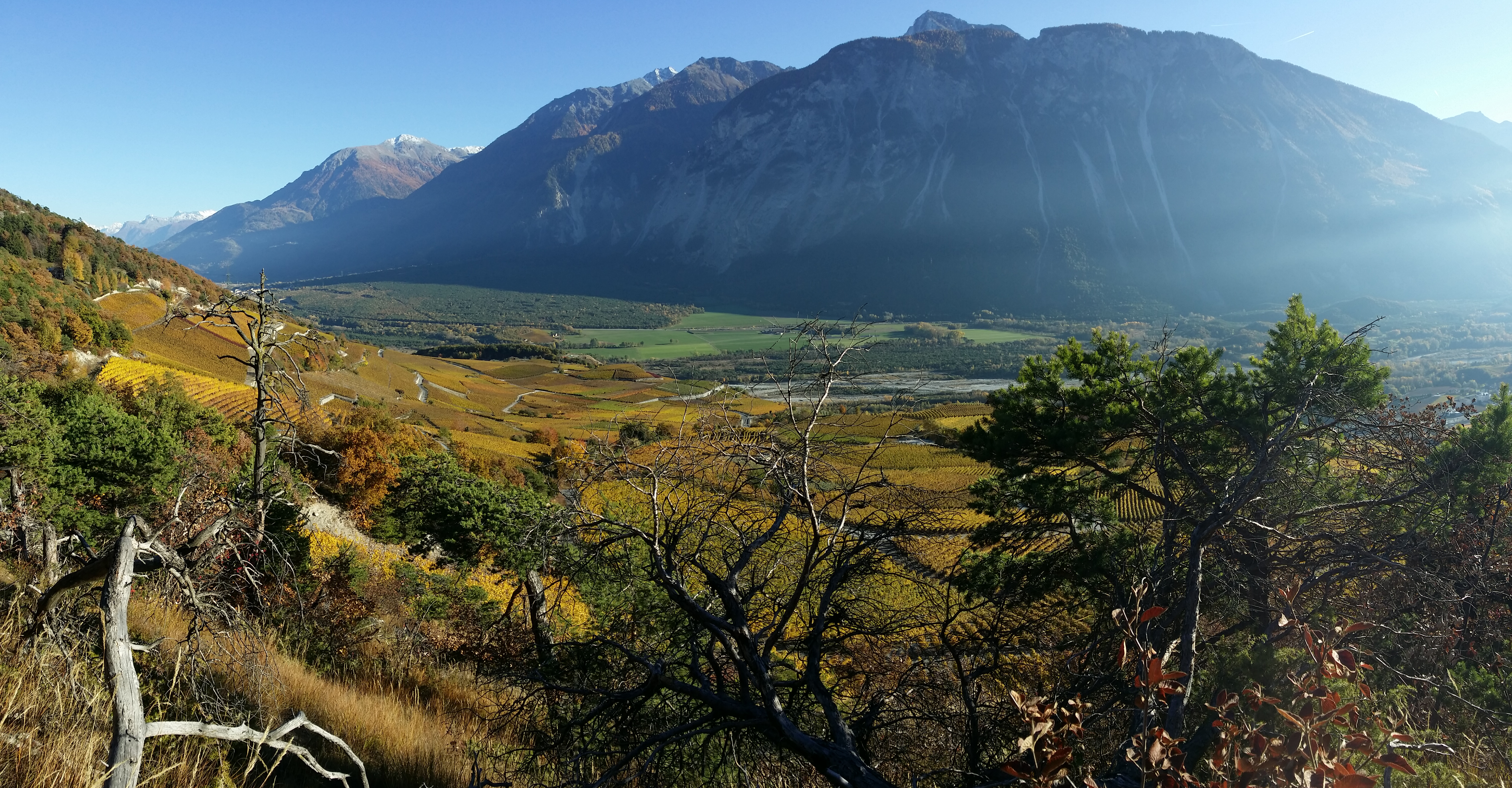
The Rhône Valley near Pfynwald. Note the vineyards, pines, and steppic vegetation that are typical of dry Central Valais

Valais is the third largest canton of Switzerland by area. It is also one of its westernmost and southernmost cantons while being adjacent to central Switzerland. With a few exceptions, it lies almost entirely in the Rhône basin, more precisely in the wide Alpine Rhône Valley, above Lake Geneva. The main settlements are all along the Rhône or in its proximity, the largest city being Sion, followed by Martigny, Monthey, Sierre, and Brig-Glis. The canton is traditionally divided into three regions: Lower Valais (French: Bas-Valais), Central Valais (French: Valais central), and Upper Valais (German: Oberwallis), with the linguistic border of the canton being at Pfynwald, between the two latter regions. While the more populous Lower and Central Valais are French-speaking, Upper Valais is German-speaking.

The Rhône Valley is a central Alpine valley, i.e. it lies well within the Alps and is shut off from both northern and southern plains. Valais is separated from the Swiss Plateau to the north by the Bernese Alps and from the Po plains to the south by the Valais Alps, respectively north and south of the Rhône. Valais is also one of the three large southern cantons lying partially in the Po basin, therefore south of the Alps, along with Ticino and the Grisons. However, contrary to those two cantons, very few settlements are on the south side of the Alps, and they are all well above the plains. The largest regions not drained by the Rhône are the Simplon Valley (Po basin) and two uninhabited areas north of the Sanetsch and the Gemmi Pass (Rhine basin).

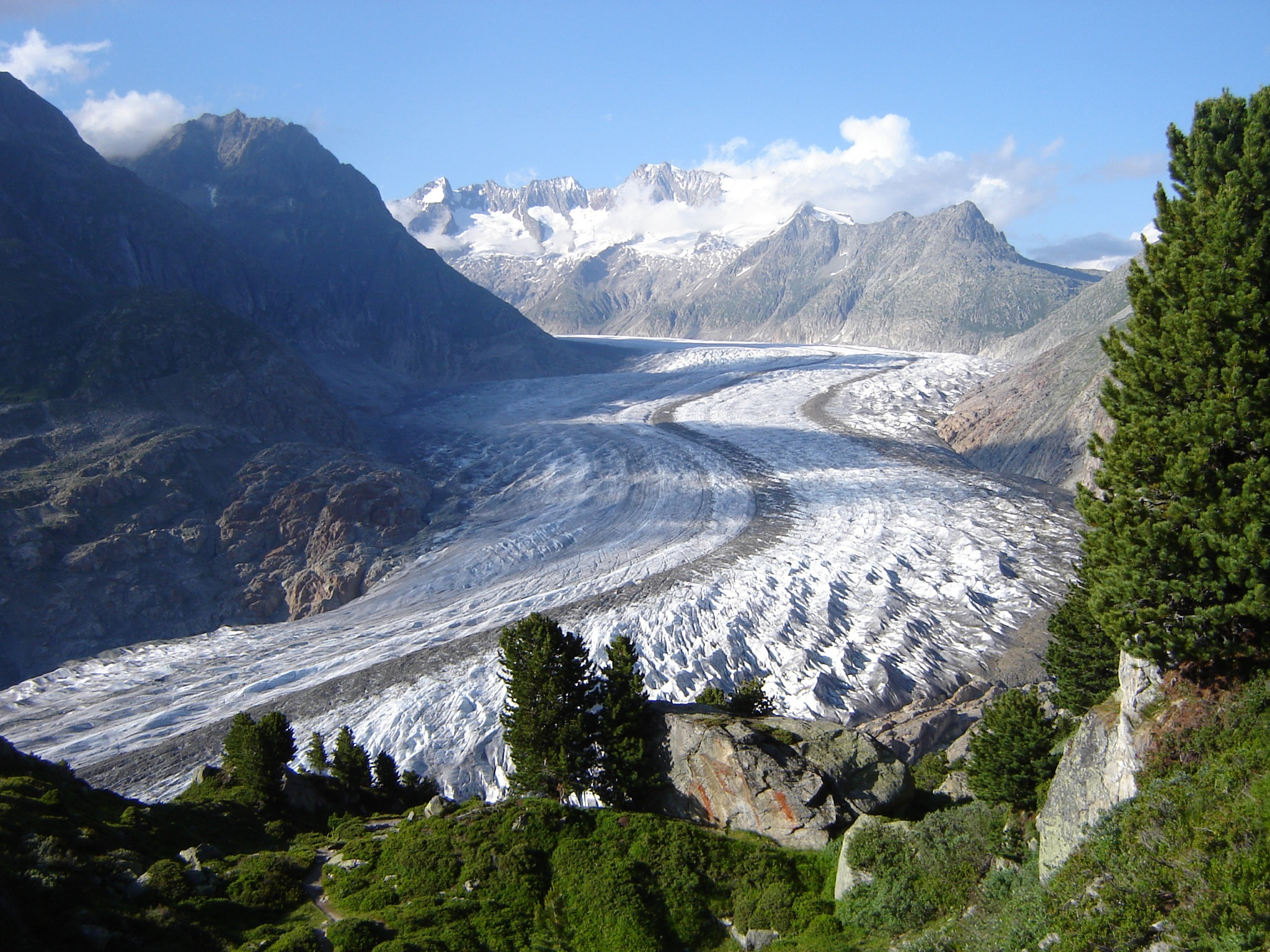
The Aletsch Glacier, largest in the Alps

Valais is the highest canton in terms of absolute, relative, and mean elevation. Therefore, its topography is extremely rugged, with the notable exception of the wide, glacial, Rhône valley. The latter valley dominates the geography of the canton. Many side valleys are branching off the main valley, often perpendicularly. These vary from narrow and remote to reasonably populous. On the south side of the Rhône, in the Valais Alps, some of the largest side valleys are (from east to west): the Mattertal (including the Saastal), the Val d'Anniviers, the Val d'Hérens, the Val de Bagnes and the Val d'Entremont. On the north of the Rhône, in the Bernese Alps, the Lötschental is the only large valley. East of Brig is the valley of Goms, the highest section of the Rhône Valley. The Rhône itself flows in the main valley from east to west from the Rhône Glacier down to Martigny, then at a right angle north to its mouth in Lake Geneva. After the town of Saint-Maurice, the eastern banks of the river belong to the canton of Vaud, although the western banks remain in Valais, down to Le Bouveret, on the shores of Lake Geneva. The main valley is bounded by the Bernese Alps in the north and the Valais Alps in the south, both ranges including numerous over 4,000 metre-high mountains, which are the highest in the country. Notables mountains include Monte Rosa (highest), reaching 4,634 metres (15,203 ft), and the Finsteraarhorn (most prominent), reaching 4,274 metres (14,022 ft). Other iconic mountains are the Matterhorn and the Jungfrau, for a complete list, see list of mountains of Valais. Located there are numerous glaciers including several of the largest in the Alps, such as the Aletsch Glacier and the Gorner Glacier. Other ranges situated partially in Valais are the Chablais Alps, the Mont Blanc Massif, the Uri Alps, the Gotthard Massif, and the Lepontine Alps.

Lake Geneva is the only truly large lake in the canton, although only a small fraction of it (about 10 km^{2} (3.9 sq mi)) is in Valais, the plain of the Rhône comprehending only small lakes. There are however numerous sizable lakes in the high Alps, mostly artificial. The largest is Lac des Dix, closely followed by the Lac d'Emosson. Other large high-elevation lakes are Lac de Mauvoisin, Mattmarksee, lac de Salanfe, Lac de Moiry and Lac de Tseuzier (see list of mountain lakes of Switzerland for a more complete list). All these lakes are used for hydroelectricity production, but they are also popular for their scenic views over the Alps.

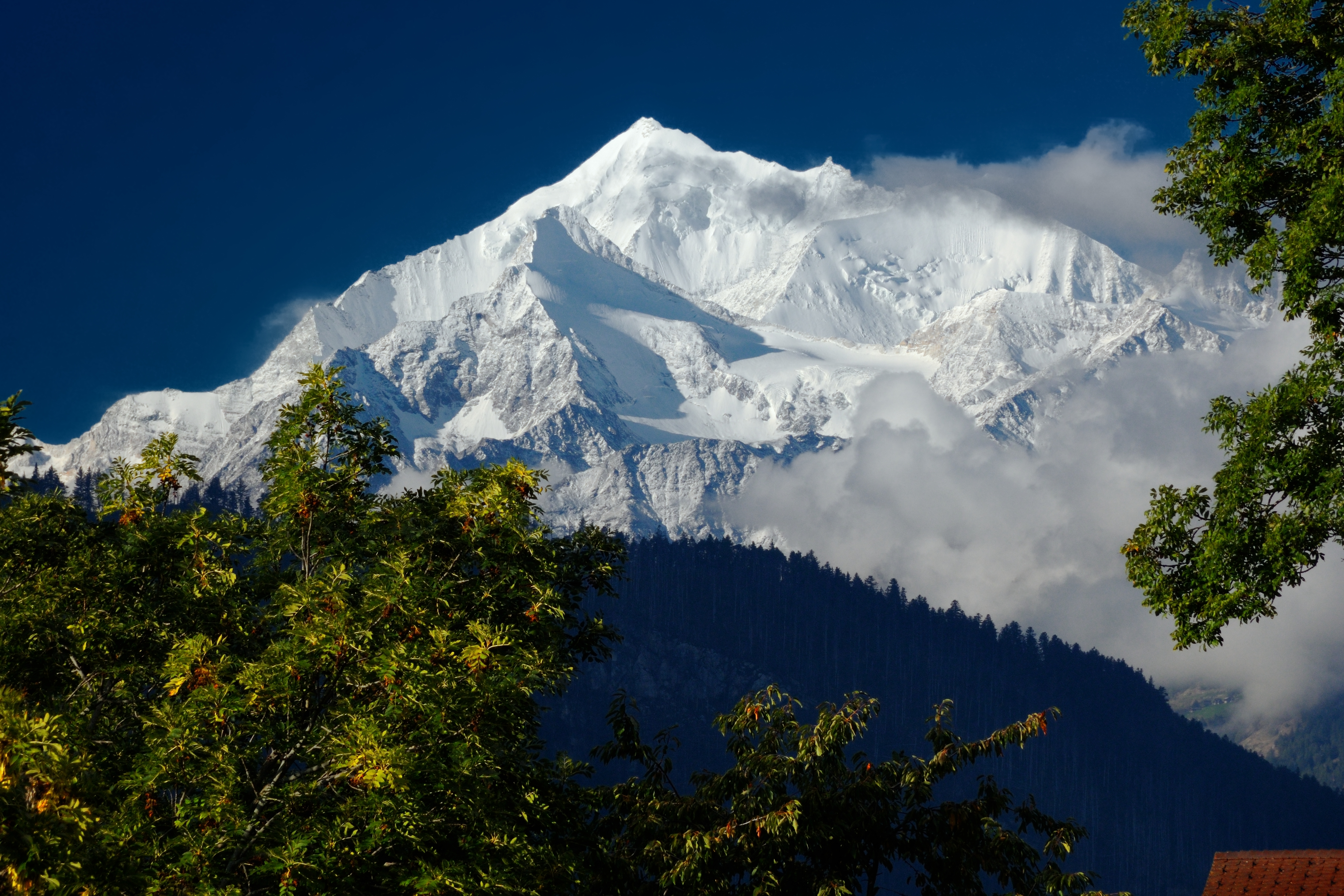
The Weisshorn, one of the highest peaks of Valais

Due to the high mountains surrounding the plains of the Rhône, the climate of central Valais is particularly dry, much drier than in the rest of Switzerland. While locations at high elevations are highly exposed to rainfall and snowfall, average rainfall per year is only about 600 mm in Sion, corresponding to 50% of that of Lucerne (north of the Alps) and 30% of that of Locarno (south of the Alps). Officially, the driest location in Valais and Switzerland is Stalden, with 545 mm of rainfall per year. Valais is often described as "semi-arid", although it is not in the climatic sense of the term. Therefore, in some areas, such as Les Follatères, are found plants that are uncommon or absent in the rest of Switzerland, such as cactuses. On the lower south-facing slopes of the Bernese Alps, numerous vineyards are cultivated, between Fully and Leuk. Unlike in the rest of the country, irrigated agriculture is common in Valais.

The canton is renowned for its numerous towns and villages in the high Alps. In the Mattertal and adjoining Saastal are Zermatt and Saas Fee. Other popular resorts are Verbier, Les Marécottes, Champéry, Grimentz, Zinal, Anzère, Crans-Montana, Evolène, Leukerbad and Fiesch. All of them are tourist destination in both summer and winter seasons.

The area of the canton is 5,224 square kilometres (2,017 sq mi) and only about half of the total area is considered productive. Valais shares borders with four other cantons: to the north are the cantons of Vaud and Bern and to the east are the cantons of Uri and Ticino. The canton shares international borders as well: to the south are the Italian regions of Aosta Valley and Piedmont and to the west is the French region of Auvergne-Rhône-Alpes.

=== Political subdivisions ===
==== Districts ====
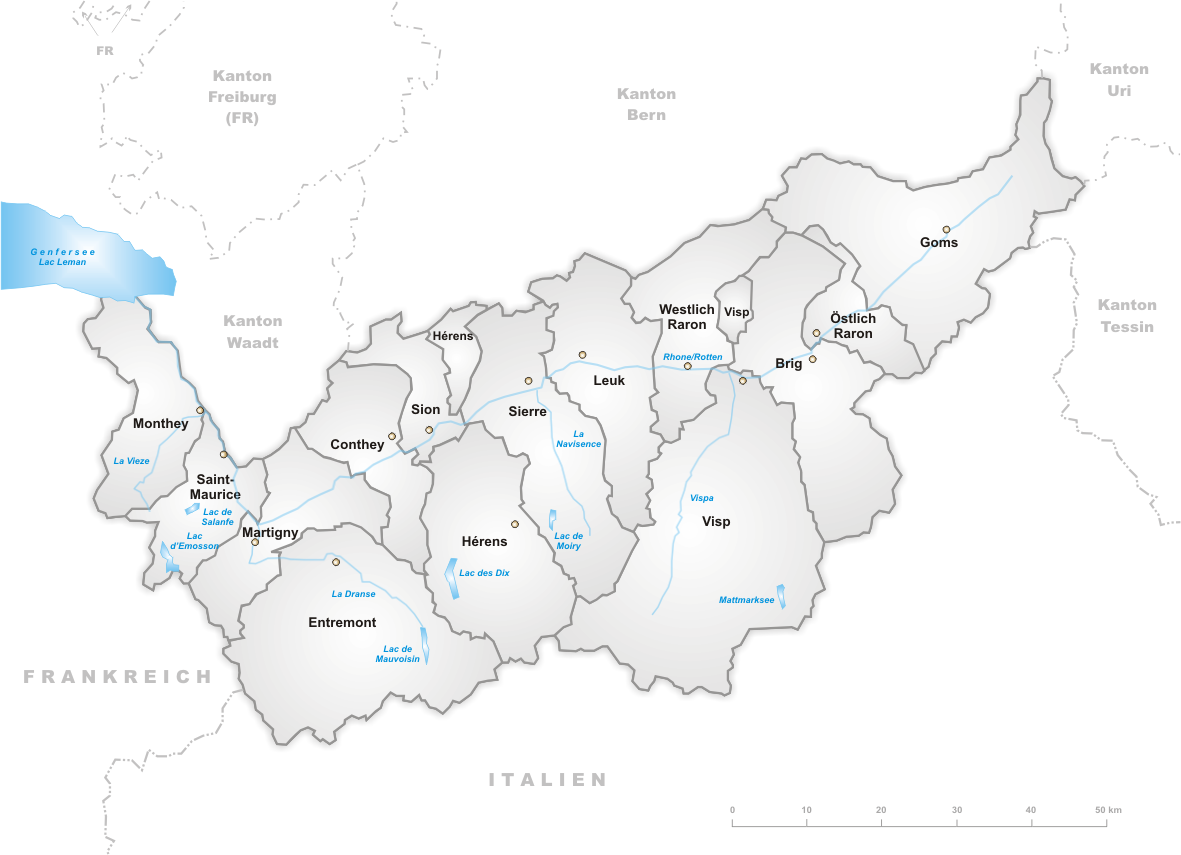
Districts in Valais

Valais is divided into 13 districts, with the district of Raron being further divided into two half-districts. The districts are listed here in geographical order:

Upper Valais:

- Goms with capital Münster-Geschinen
- Östlich Raron (half-district) with capital Mörel-Filet
- Brig with capital Brig-Glis
- Visp with capital Visp
- Westlich Raron (half-district) with capital Raron
- Leuk with capital Leuk

Central Valais:

- Sierre with capital Sierre
- Hérens with capital Vex
- Sion with capital Sion
- Conthey with capital Conthey

Lower Valais:

- Entremont with capital Sembrancher
- Martigny with capital Martigny
- Saint-Maurice with capital Saint-Maurice
- Monthey with capital Monthey

==== Municipalities ====
There are 122 municipalities in the canton (as of January 2021).

== Demographics ==
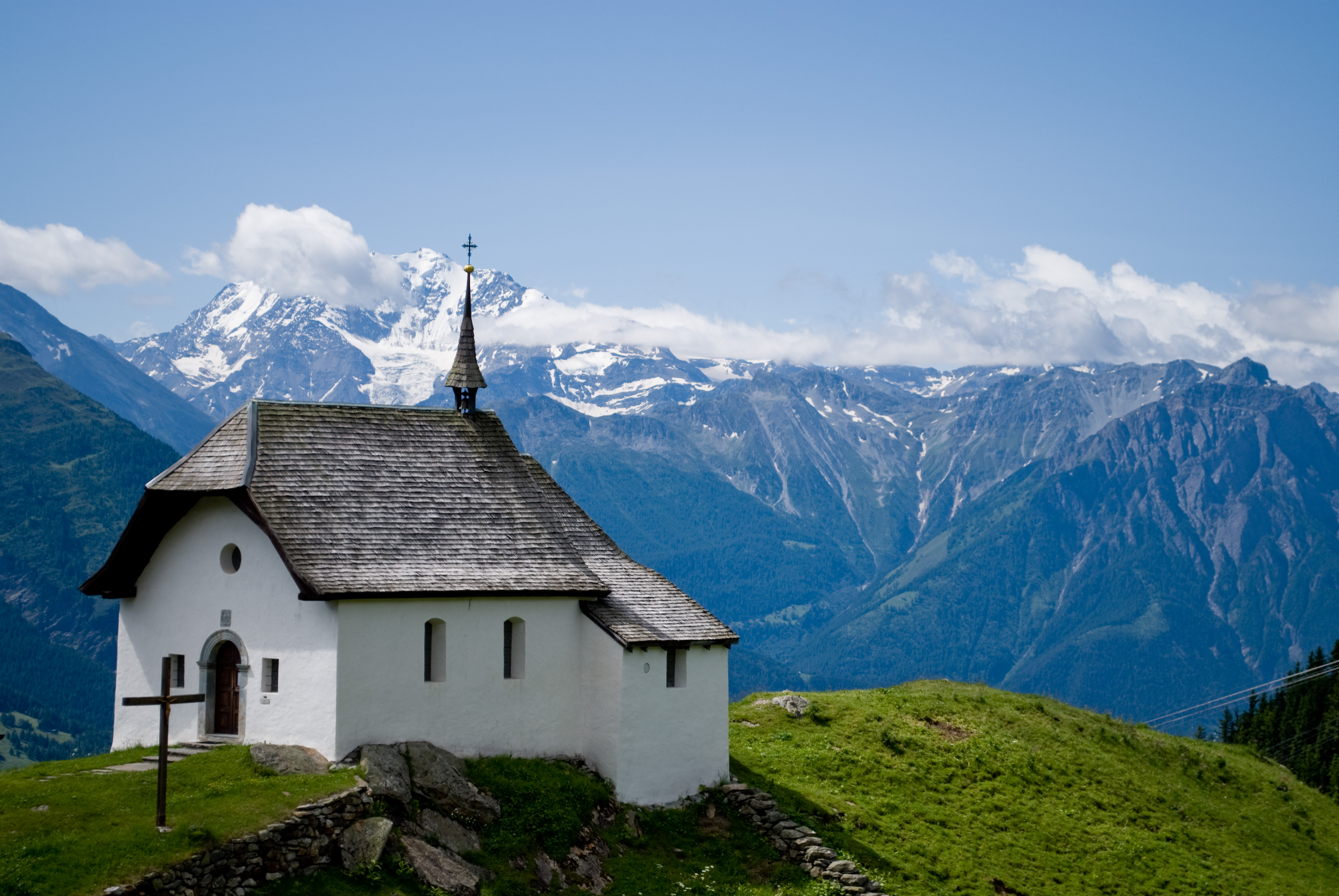
Predominantly Catholic, the canton includes numerous churches and Alpine chapels (here Maria zum Schnee in Bettmeralp)

The western part of Valais (Central and Lower Valais) is French-speaking, while the eastern part (Upper Valais) is German-speaking. The language border crosses the Rhône between the towns of Sierre and Salgesch and follows the mountain ridge including Bella Tola, Weisshorn, and Dent Blanche. At the 2000 census, 62.8% of the population of Valais spoke French or Arpitan, 28.4% spoke German or Walser German, 2.2% spoke Italian and 6.6% spoke other languages. Only 114 people reported speaking Romansh.

The canton is sparsely populated. Its population (as of 31 December 2020) is 348,503. As of 2007, the population included 57,061 foreigners, or about 19.1% of the total population. The largest towns are the capital Sion (Sitten), Monthey, Sierre, Martigny and Brig-Glis. There is no major city located in the canton. As of 2017, 77% of total population was Roman Catholic, while only 6% were members of Swiss Reformed Church.

=== Historical population ===
The historical population is given in the following table:

Historic population data
Year	Total population	Swiss	Non-Swiss	Population share of total country
1850	81,559	79,871	1,688	3.4%
1880	100,190	97,134	3,056	3.5%
1900	114,438	106,220	8,218	3.5%
1950	159,178	154,179	4,999	3.4%
1970	206,563	185,309	21,254	3.3%
2000	272,399	225,356	47,043	3.7%
2020	348,503			4.0%

== Politics ==
=== Federal election results ===
Percentage of the total vote per party in the canton in the National Council Elections 1971–2015
Party	Ideology	1971	1975	1979	1983	1987	1991	1995	1999	2003	2007	2011	2015
FDP.The Liberals^{a}	Classical liberalism	19.3	18.9	22.7	25.2	24.6	25.9	24.2	18.8	17.1	16.0	18.8	18.1
CVP/PDC/PPD/PCD	Christian democracy	61.5	59.7	58.8	57.5	58.7	54.3	54.8	51.4	47.9	44.9	39.9	39.8
SP/PS	Social democracy	15.4	17.4	11.6	14.1	14.5	14.5	16.6	16.9	19.1	14.7	14.6	13.3
SVP/UDC	Swiss nationalism	* ^{b}	*	*	*	*	*	*	9.0	13.4	16.6	19.7	22.1
LPS/PLS	Swiss liberalism	*	*	0.8	*	*	3.9	2.2	1.8	*	1.0	*	*
CSP/PCS	Christian left	*	*	*	*	*	*	*	*	*	1.1	0.7	1.4
BDP/PBD	Conservatism	*	*	*	*	*	*	*	*	*	*	0.6	*
PdA/PST-POP/PC/PSL	Socialism	*	*	*	*	*	*	0.9	*	*	*	*	*
GPS/PES	Green politics	*	*	*	*	1.7	1.3	1.3	2.1	2.6	3.9	5.0	4.9
Other		3.8	4.0	6.2	3.2	0.6	*	*	*	*	1.8	0.6	0.4
Voter participation %		67.2	66.6	65.7	65.3	59.6	60.3	55.0	52.7	53.6	59.8	61.8	59.8

^a FDP before 2009, the Liberals after 2009
^b "*" indicates that the party was not on the ballot in this canton.

== Economy ==
=== Primary sector ===
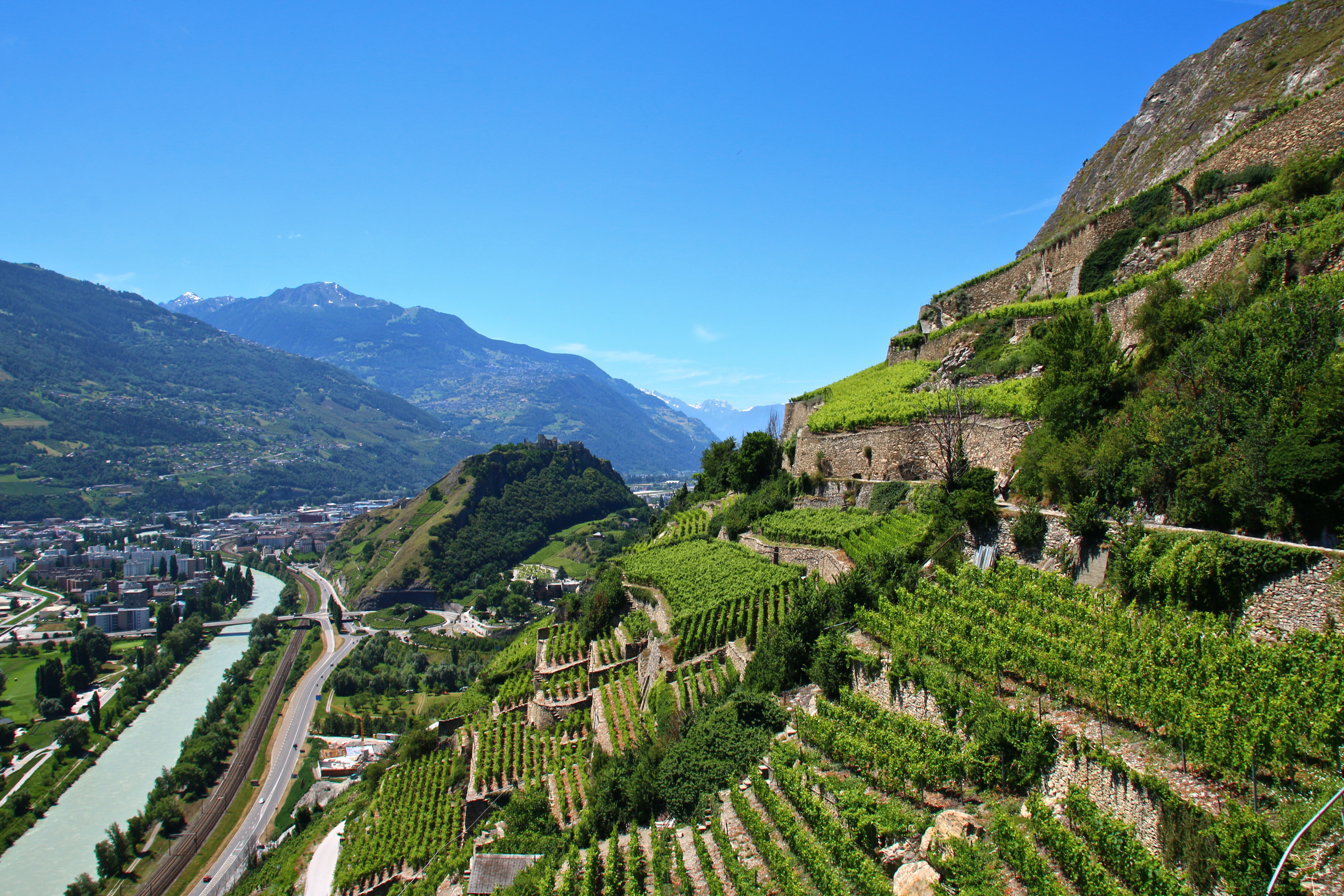
Terraced vineyards in the Rhône Valley

Wines and fruit brandies, such as Poire Williams, are some of the main production of the canton. This form of agriculture is often irrigated through the use of small open-air wooden canals_{,} called bisses in French and Suonen in German, that transport water from the glaciers above. They also constitute popular hiking routes because of their low declivity. Vineyards are grown on terraces, typically on the south-facing slopes overlooking the Rhône Valley, where they have become an integral part of the landscape. The wine industry of the canton is the largest in Switzerland. There are also a large number orchards in the area, among which are apricot trees. The apricot has become the emblematic fruit of the canton. In Mund, saffron is also gathered.

Agriculture in Valais also consists of cattle breeding in the mountains and dairy farming in the plains. The canton is notable for its cheese and dried meat production. The Hérens cattle are also used in organised cow fights.

=== Secondary sector ===
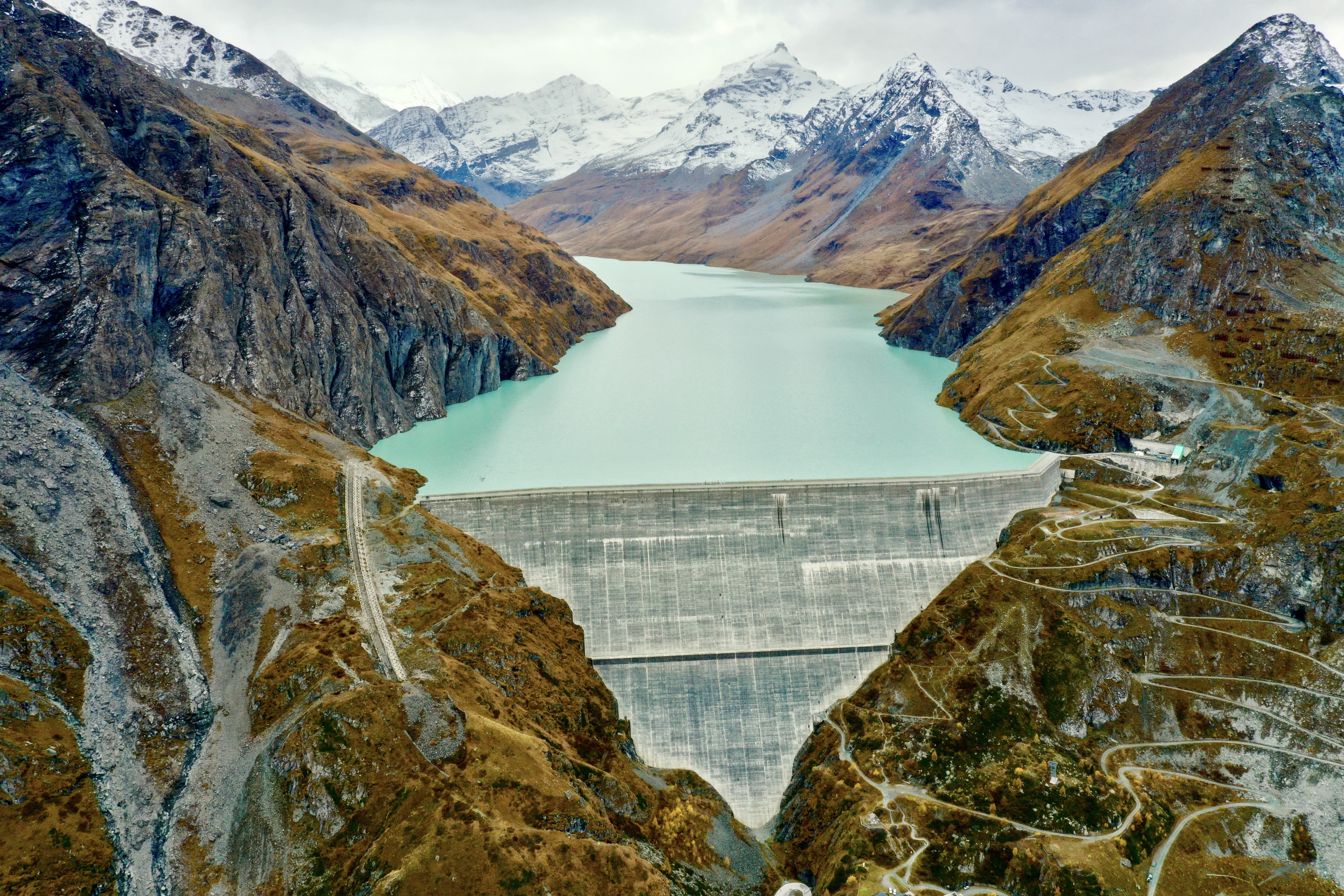
The Grande Dixence is one of the world's largest dams

Europe's tallest gravity dam is located at Grande Dixence in the canton, closely followed by the Mauvoisin Dam. Hydroelectric power plants from the canton produce about a quarter of Swiss electricity.

The west part and the most industrial region of the canton is called Chablais. The area is very important for the economy. The lands from Lake Geneva to the town of St-Maurice are located in the Chablais. There are a lot of factories, the most important are the subsidiaries of Novartis and Syngenta, in Monthey. In the town of Collombey-Muraz, there is an oil refinery.

The Lonza Group has large factories in Visp. Near Visp there is a large aluminium processing plant. Other metal products and chemicals are produced around Visp and Sierre, including Swiss Diamond International aluminum cookware.

=== Tertiary sector ===
Valais has a long touristic tradition. The hotels near the mountain helped the development of Valais Tourism. Many of them, such as César Ritz, spent time and money to satisfy a clientele from around the world. The canton is nowadays a year-round destination, renowned for its wild landscapes and numerous tourist facilities. In winter, skiing and other snow-related sports are the most popular activities. In summer, hiking and trekking are particularly popular. Climbing and mountaineering can be practised year-round, with the highest mountains of western Europe surrounding Valais. Many of the huts owned by the Swiss Alpine Club are located in the canton.

Valais counts more than 120 winter and summer destinations, including:

- Goms (district): Fiesch-Eggishorn, Bellwald, Binn, Ernen, Obergoms, Oberwald
- Aletsch (UNESCO World Heritage): Bettmeralp, Fiescheralp, Riederalp
- Brig-Glis and surrounding area: Blatten, Belalp, Mund, Termen, Birgisch
- Visp and surrounding area: Visperterminen, Bürchen, Eischoll, Stalden, Törbel, Unterbäch
- Zermatt with Matterhorn and the largest summer ski area of Switzerland, on the southern slopes of Breithorn reachable from the cable car station of the Klein Matterhorn
- Saas Valley: Saas-Fee, Saas-Almagell, Saas-Grund with Fee Glacier, the second largest summer ski area in Switzerland
- Leukerbad
- Sierre, Salquenen and Anniviers, Chandolin, St. Luc, Grimentz, Vercorin, Zinal
- Crans-Montana
- Sion and surrounding area: Anzère, Val d'Hérens, Arolla, Euseigne, Evolène, Hérémence, Mase, Saint-Martin
- 4 Vallées ski area: Nendaz, Verbier, Veysonnaz, Thyon-Les Collons, Mayens-de-Riddes/La Tzoumaz
- Chablais and Portes du Soleil, Champéry, Champoussin, Morgins, Les Crosets, Torgon, Val-d'Illiez, Le Bouveret, Saint-Maurice, Monthey, Evionnaz, St. Gingolph
- St. Bernard Region: Les Marécottes, Bruson, La Fouly, Champex, Vichères-Liddes

The Matterhorn near Zermatt and the Saas Fee valley are considered a major one in the Swiss Alps. Other parts of the mountains of the canton further west are popular as well, such as the more French-speaking resorts near Verbier and the Evolène and Arolla region. The resorts on the north side of the main Rhône valley are popular, looking out southwards towards the Peninne Alps and still part of the southern slope of the Bernese Alps, such as the family-oriented resort of Crans-Montana. The resorts in the Goms (district) are slightly less known, yet also receive attention during the summer hiking season and the winter ski season. Skiing and mountain climbing are popular with tourists in the region.

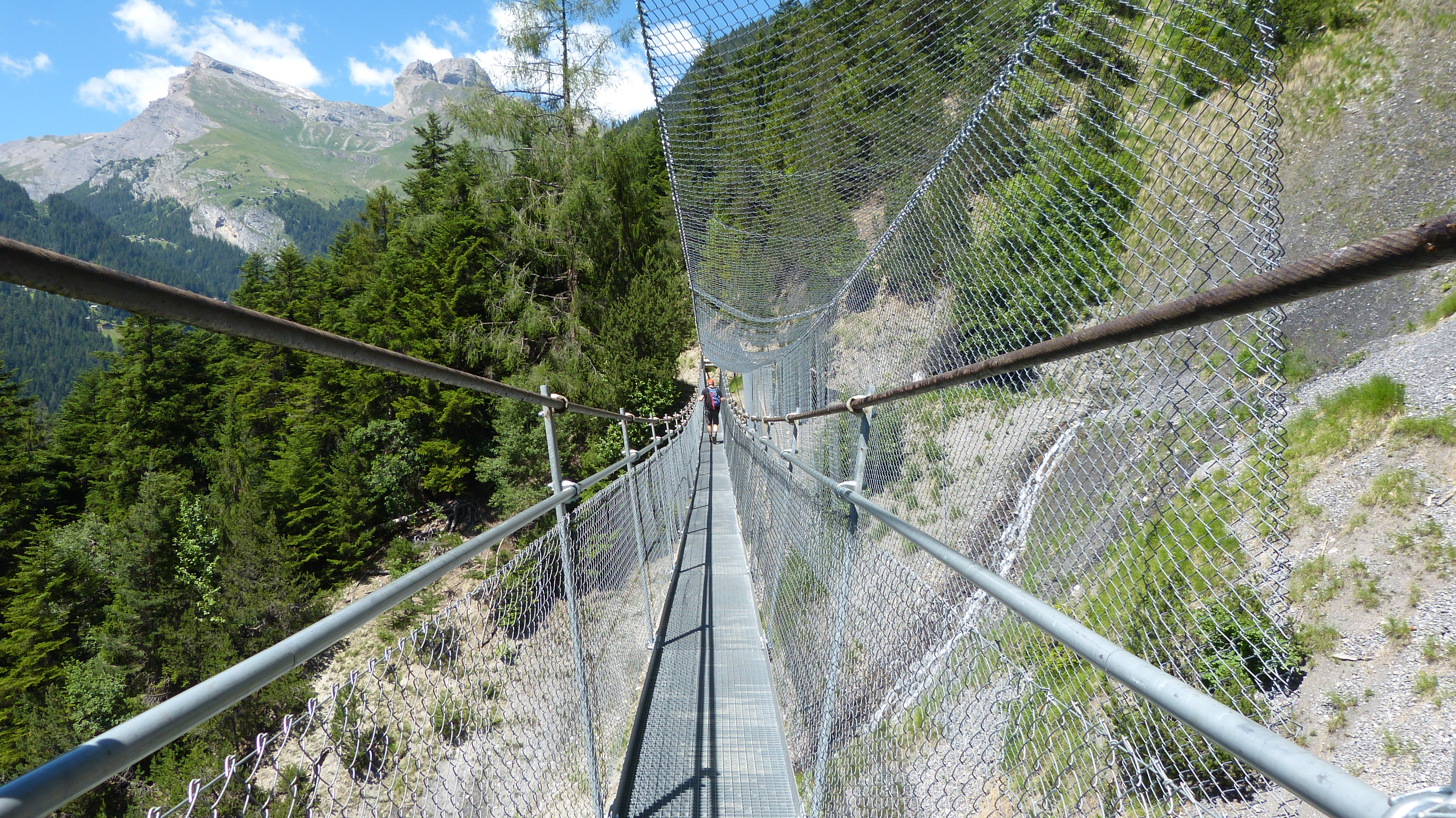
Hikers on the bisse de Savièse

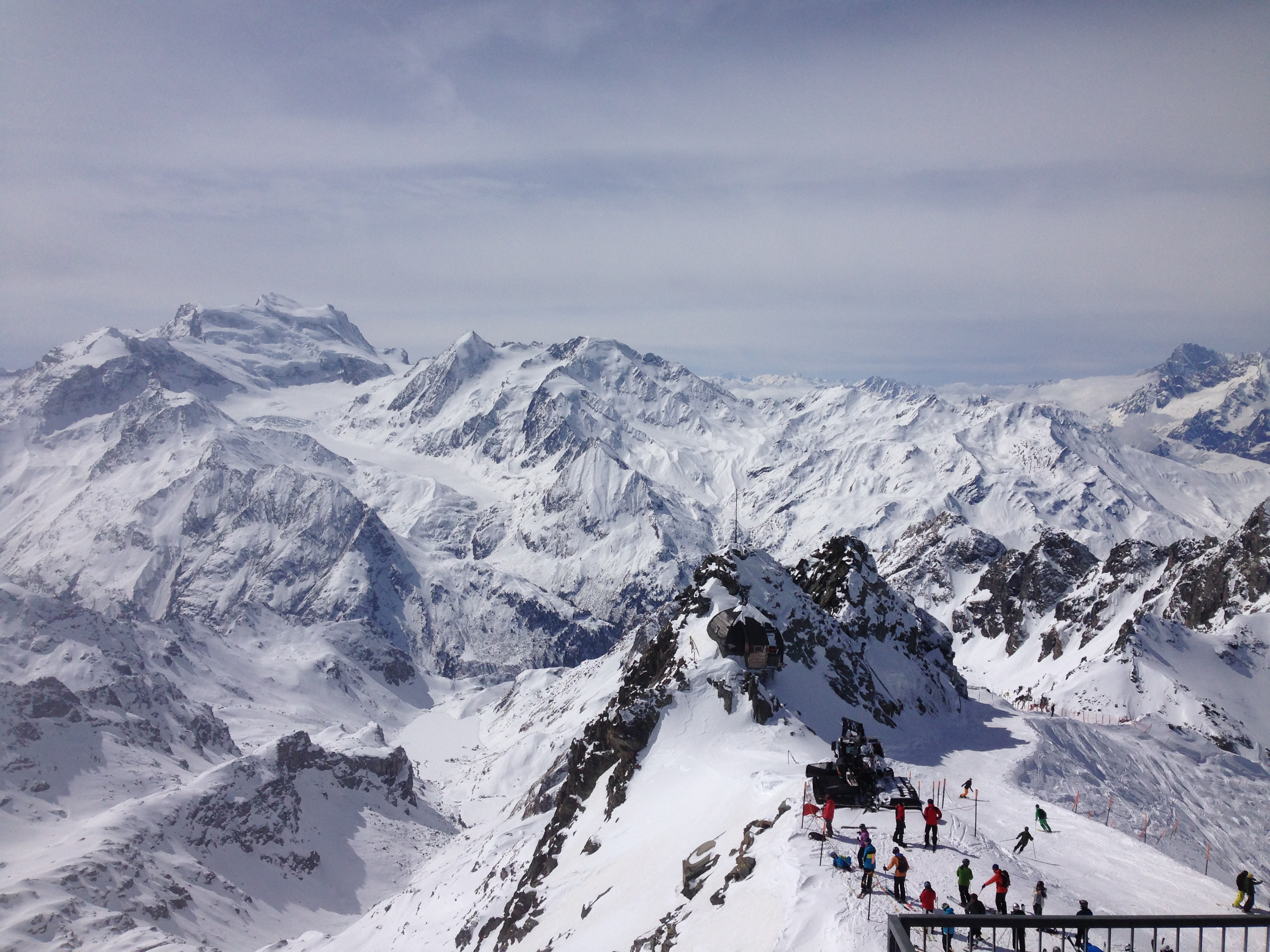
Skiers above Verbier

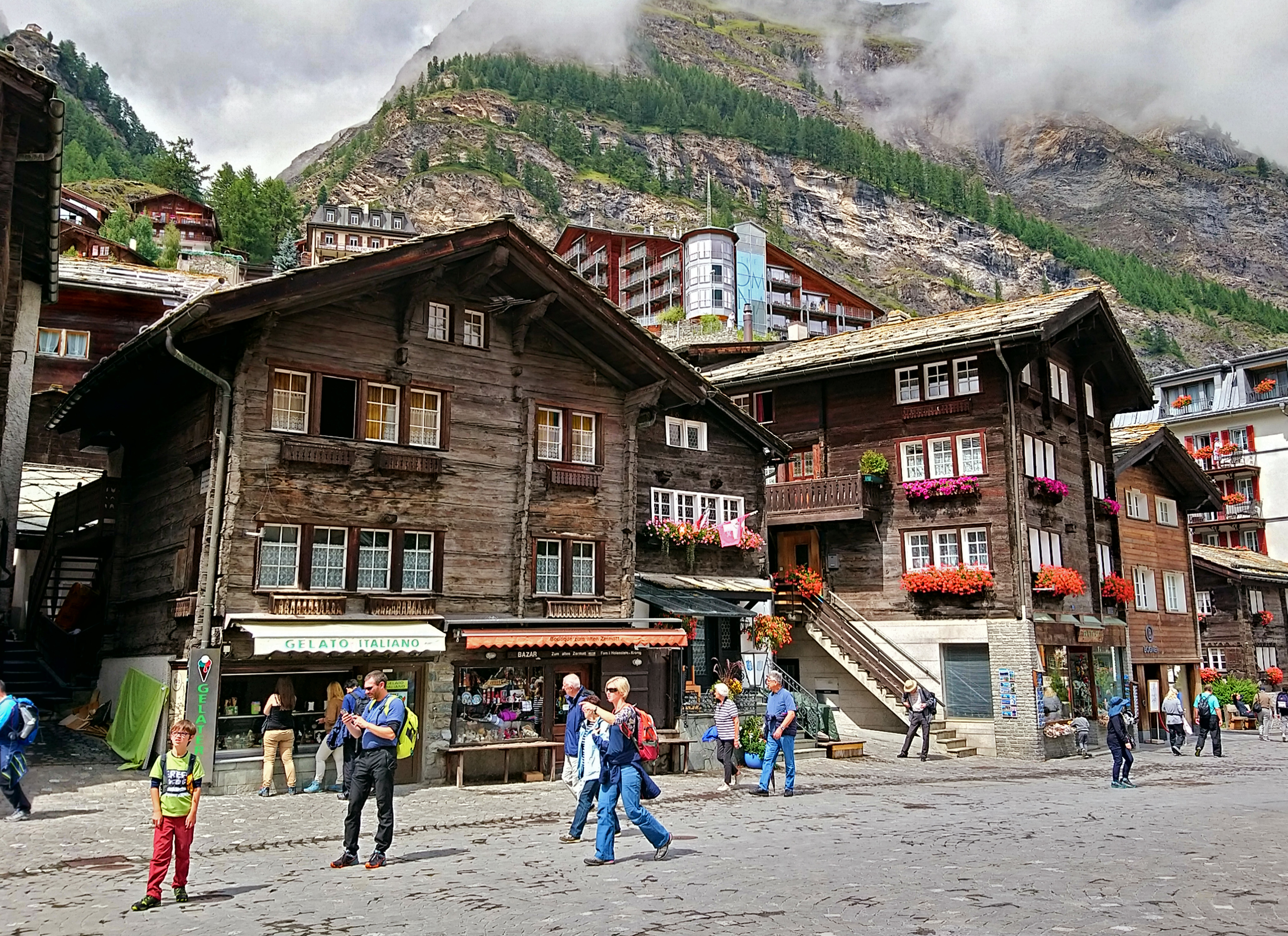
Tourists strolling the streets of Zermatt

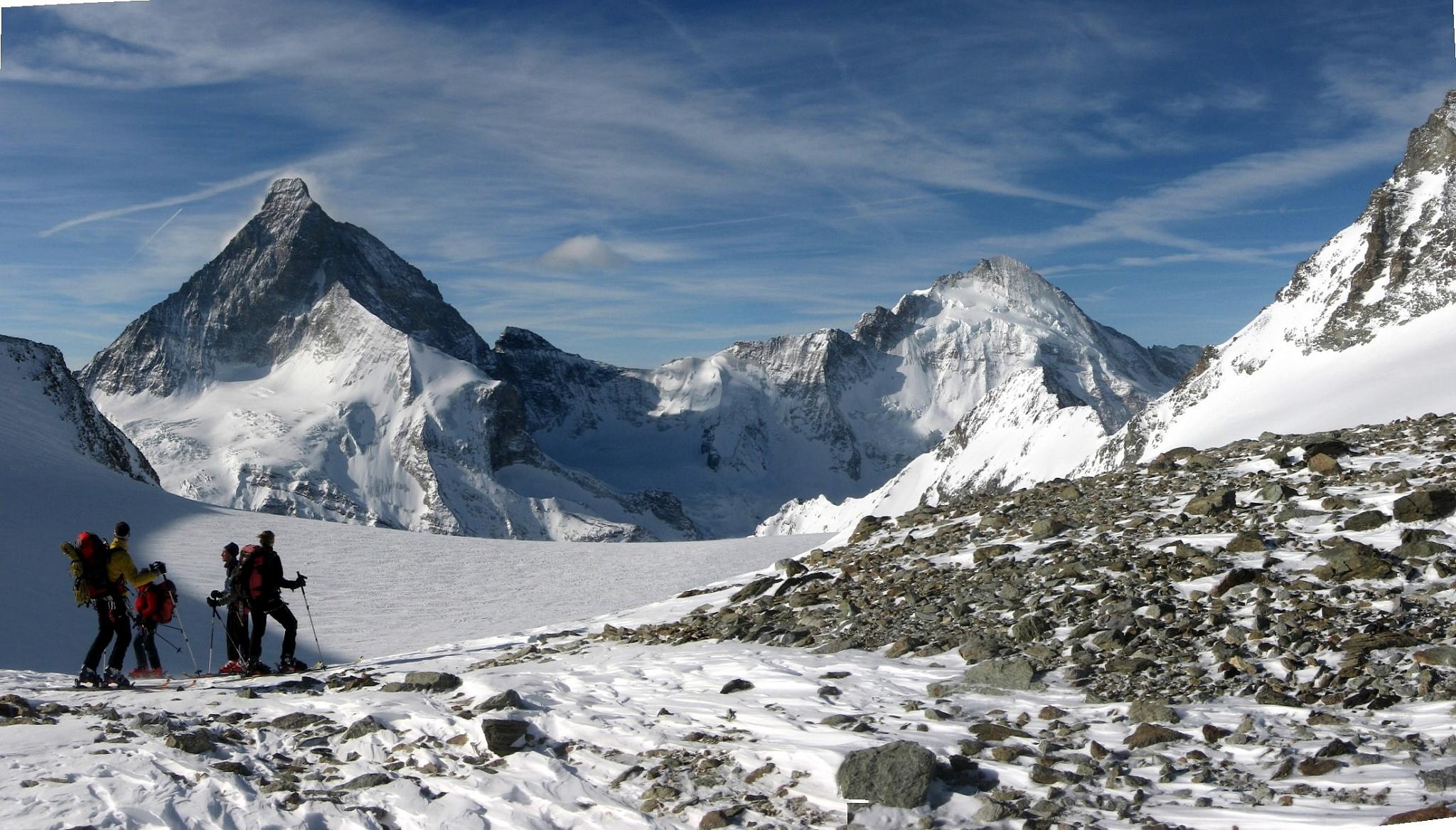
Ski mountaineers resting in front of the Matterhorn and Dent d'Hérens

== Transport ==
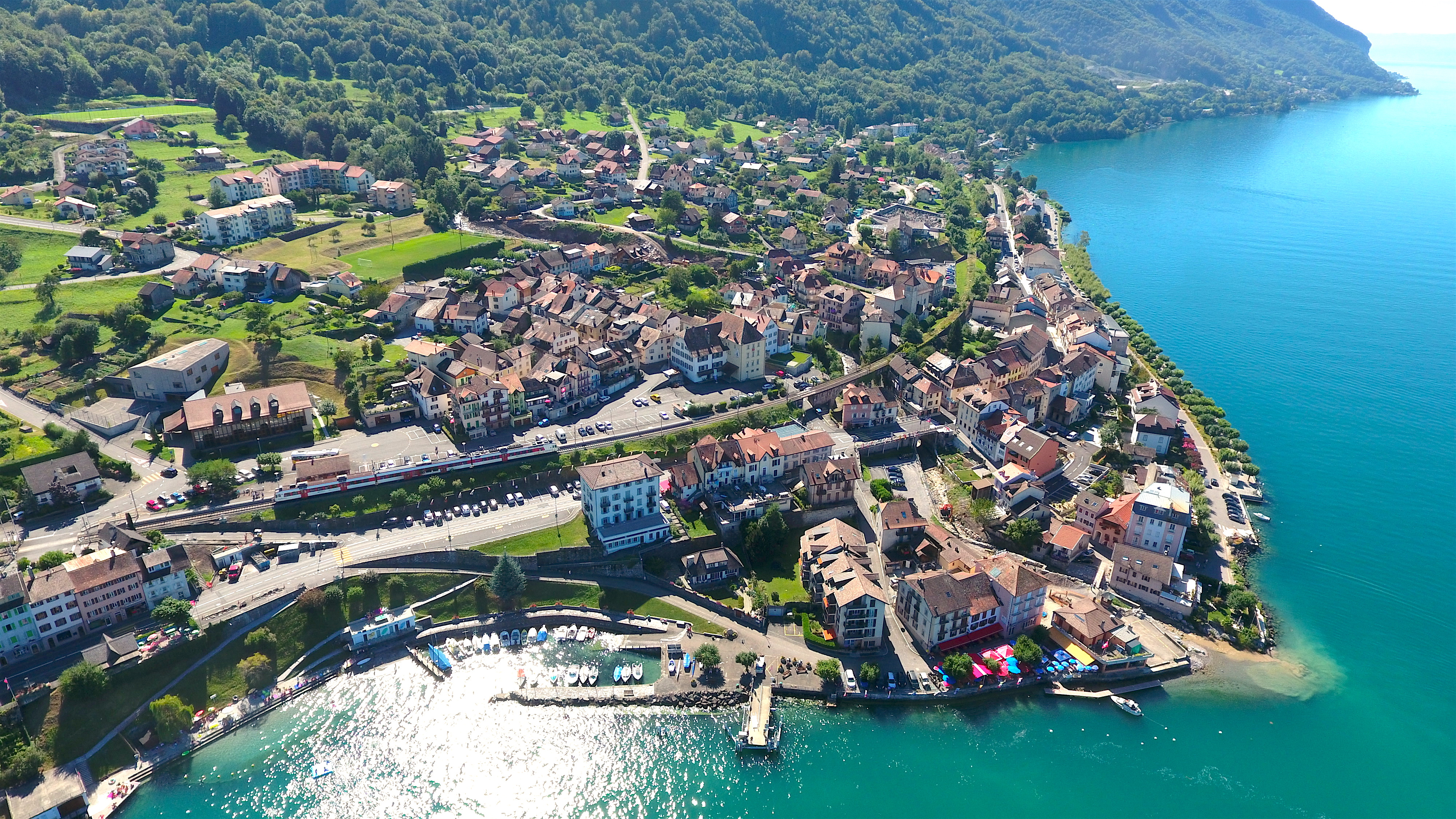
St. Gingolph is one of the only two ports on Lake Geneva, and the terminus of the Tonkin Railway

The only natural low-elevation access to Valais is via the banks of Lake Geneva, which have several railways and highways leading towards Martigny, Sion, and the rest of the canton. The major axis is on the north side of the lake and passes via Lausanne and Vevey in the canton of Vaud. From there runs the A9 motorway and the Simplon Railway, ultimately leading to Italy via the Simplon Pass and Simplon Tunnel respectively. On the south side of Lake Geneva, from the French border, is only a highway and the historical Tonkin Railway, now operating in Valais only.

The canton is surrounded by high mountains, but some major mountain passes connect it with the rest of Europe. The main road passes are the Grimsel (towards the canton of Bern and the Swiss Plateau), the Furka (Uri), the Nufenen (Ticino), the Simplon and the Great St. Bernard (Italy), and the Forclaz and the Morgins (France). Also notable are the historical and pedestrian passes of the Sanetsch, Rawil, Gemmi, and the Lötschberg, connecting Valais with the Swiss Plateau, through the Bernese Oberland.

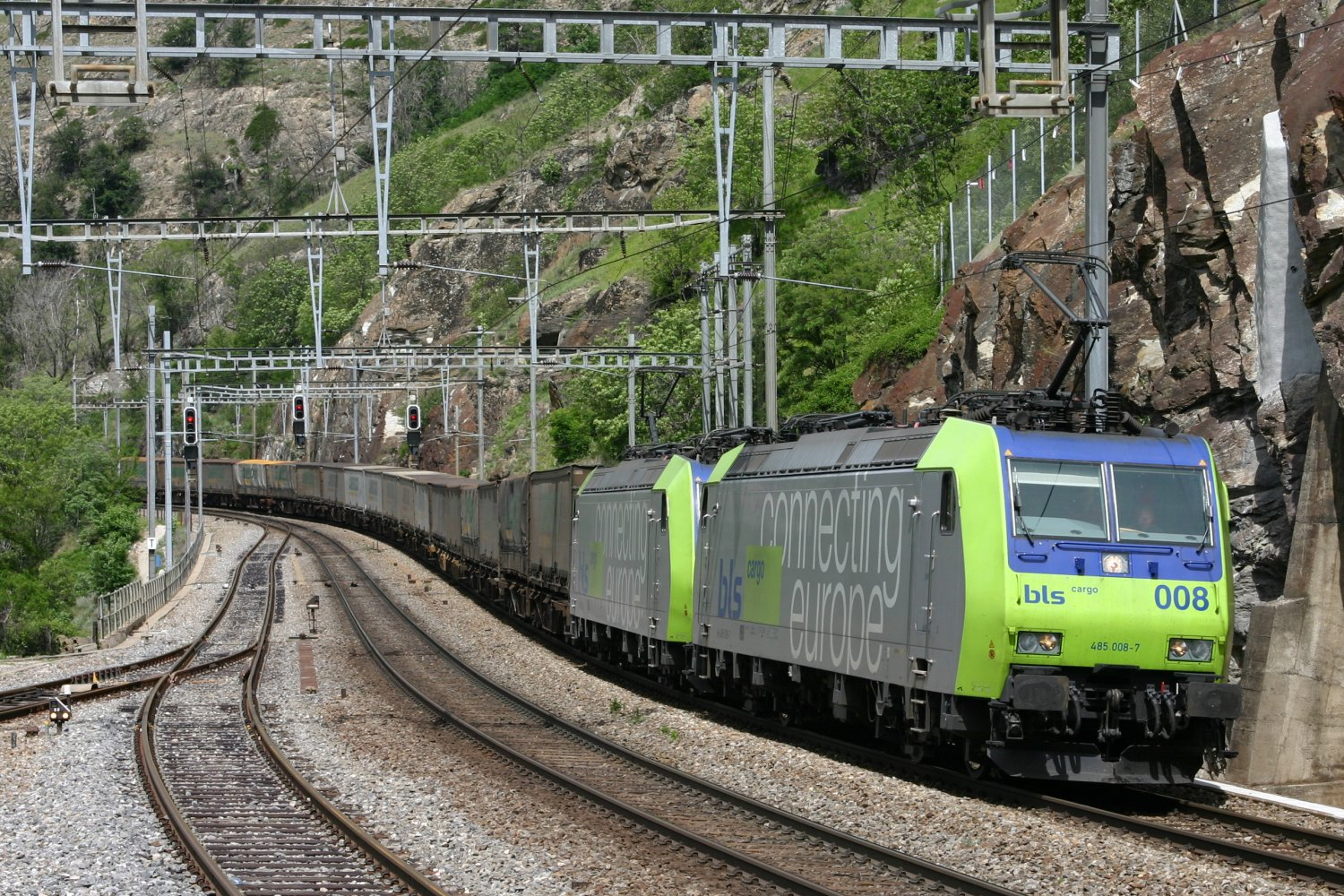
BLS train descending the summit line of the Lötschberg Railway

The Lötschberg, together with the Simplon, is one of the main north–south axes of Switzerland. The historical Lötschberg Railway opened in 1913. It connects directly Brig to the Swiss Plateau across the Bernese Alps, via Spiez in the canton of Bern, through the high-elevation Lötschberg Tunnel. In 2007, the importance of that axis was further increased with the opening of the low-elevation Lötschberg Base Tunnel, the first high-speed railway connecting Valais to Bern, following essentially the same route, but at the level of the plains. The Lötschberg Base Tunnel was the longest land tunnel in the world when opened, finally opening up Valais to northern Switzerland. The summit railway, through the historical tunnel, is still used for regional traffic and car transportation across the Lötschberg. The old train line is popular for its highly scenic sections in both cantons on either side of the old tunnel.

Another railway axis connects Valais with central and eastern Switzerland. This is a metre-gauge railway owned by the Matterhorn Gotthard Bahn, which ultimately leads to Disentis and Chur, from Zermatt via Visp and Brig. The main railway goes through the Furka Base Tunnel in the extreme east of the canton, with the older Furka Summit Tunnel being popular for its highly scenic sections as well. The Glacier Express directly connects Zermatt with St. Moritz, using both Matterhorn Gotthard Bahn and Rhaetian Railway network.

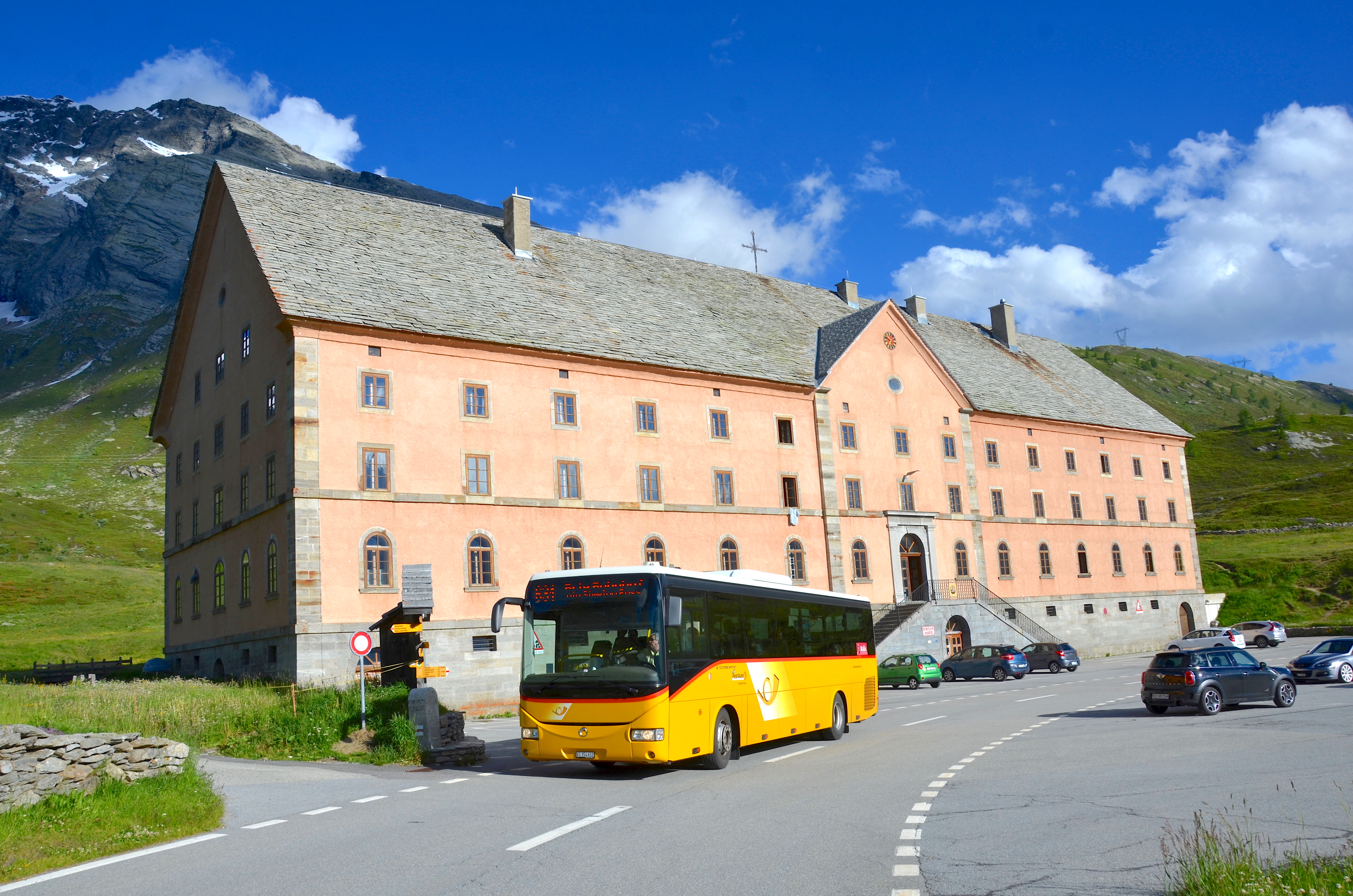
A postbus waiting on the summit of the Simplon Pass

The canton comprehends a road network, with elevations ranging from that of Lake Geneva at Le Bouveret to that of the Nufenen Pass, the highest paved road in Valais. The A9, the only motorway, serves the valley up to Sierre, the extension towards Brig being currently under construction. All inhabited side valleys are accessible to motorized transport since the 1960s; the high-elevation reservoirs built during those years, notably the Grande Dixence, necessitating paved roads as well. As in most other cantons, localities are essentially served by PostBus Switzerland, which also operates numerous tourist lines on the Alpine passes and to the high-elevation lakes. Martigny, Sion, Sierre and Brig are hubs of public transportation. The winding mountain roads of Valais are very popular with drivers, bikers, and cyclists for their spectacular scenery and are the highlights of competitions such as Tour de Suisse and the Rallye International du Valais. For a list of high-elevation paved roads, see list of highest paved roads in Switzerland.

Because of tourism, there are many railways and cable cars in the mountains. Railways serving side valleys are the Aigle–Ollon–Monthey–Champéry railway, the Martigny–Orsières Railway (notably serving Verbier), the Martigny–Châtelard Railway (serving the Trient Valley) and the Visp-Zermatt railway. Above Zermatt, the Gornergrat Railway and the Klein Matterhorn cable car are respectively the highest open-air railway and highest public transport in Europe.

The Valais has two ports on Lake Geneva served by the CGN: St. Gingolph and Le Bouveret. The canton is served by Sion Airport. However, the airport only provides routes to limited destinations. The nearest larger domestic and international airport is Geneva Airport, located 160 km (99 mi) west of Sion.

== Culture ==
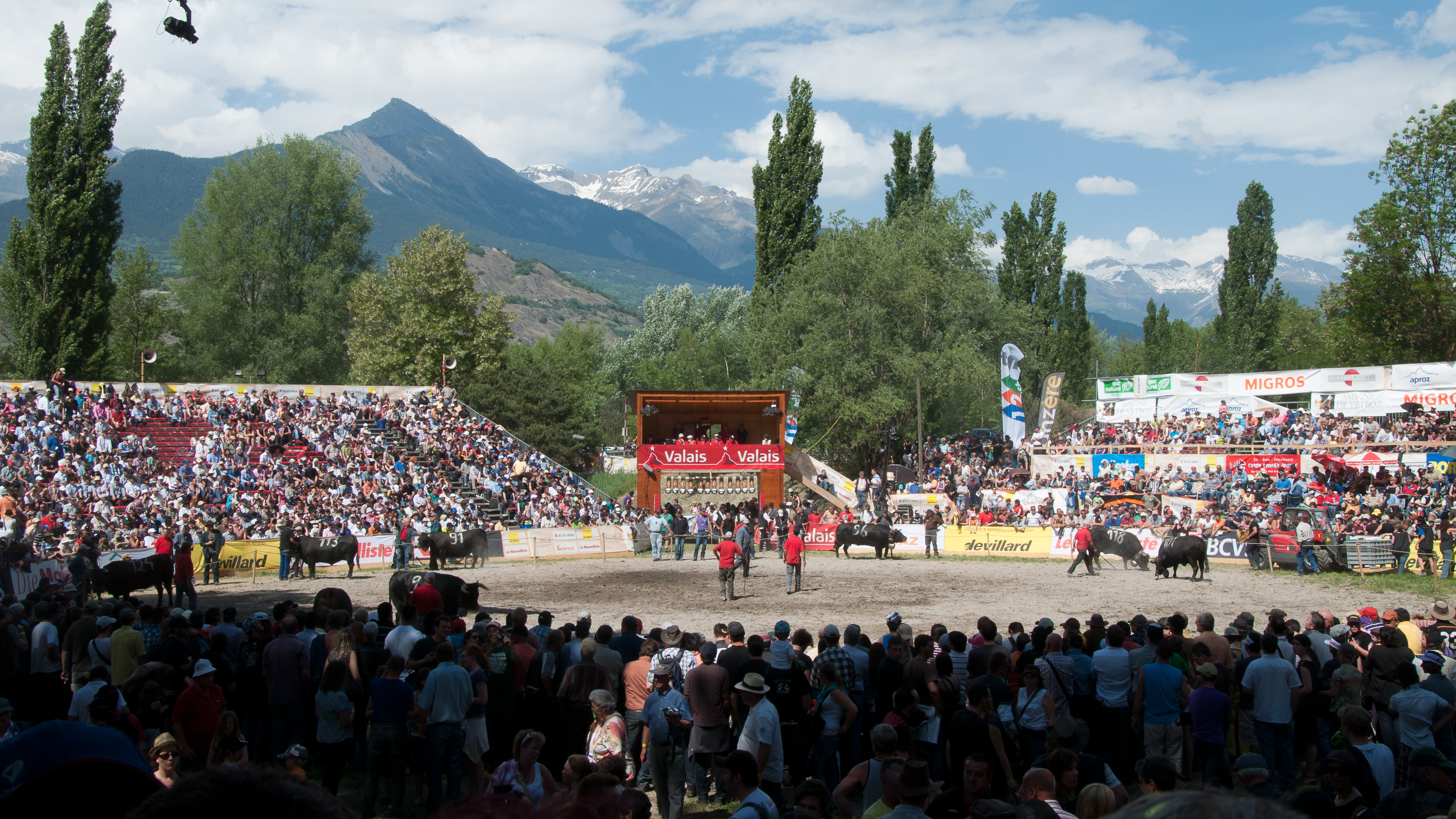
People gathering at the national cow fighting final

The size and particular geographical situation of the canton within the Alps helped Valais develop a culture that is distinct from that of the cantons of the Swiss Plateau and the northern Alpine foothills. As a bilingual canton, Valais itself includes some cultural diversity as well. The most common denominator is a strong mountain culture, symbolized by the archetypal tenacious and austere mountain dweller facing the difficult conditions and dangers of nature.

The people of Valais, from the warlike races that originally inhabited it, are strong and vigorous; they were able, with their remarkable endurance, to make the most of natural resources, the possession of which today assures them an honorable place as much as they deserve among the other better-off peoples of ancient Helvetia. Through its economic development and its commendable progress in all areas of human activity, Valais, faithful to its traditions as well as to its faith, has managed to keep the austerity of ancestral mores, its customs, its naive legends, its rustic costumes, everything that today constitutes its character and originality.

— Solandieu

=== Monuments ===
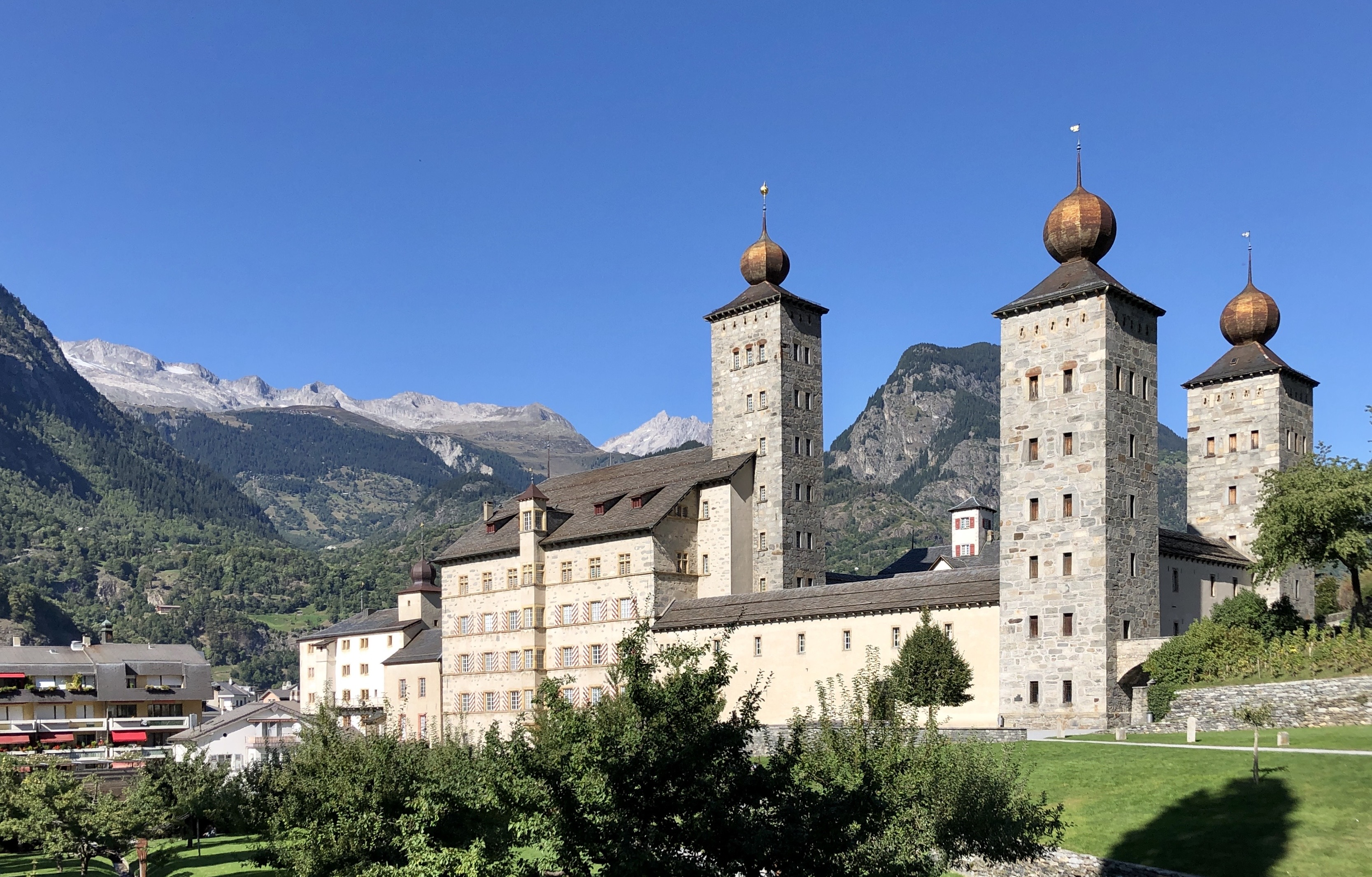
The Stockalper Palace in Brig

Many monuments dot the Valais landscape. The best known are the Valère Basilica, where the oldest organ in the world still playable is found, and the territorial Abbey of Saint-Maurice, which dates from the 6th century. Valais has several castles of historical importance, frequently built in formerly strategic locations: Tourbillon Castle, Saint-Maurice Castle, Stockalper Palace, La Bâtiaz Castle, Majorie Castle, the episcopal Leuk Castle etc. Amongst religious buildings are several churches that present quality architecture, in particular, those due to the architect Ulrich Ruffiner (16th century) who left many buildings between Sion and the Goms valley: Saint-Théodule church in Sion, the church of Raron and church of Ernen. In the valley of Goms, are also several notable baroque churches. Contemporary religious architecture has also given rise to interesting buildings, such as the works of the Genevan architect Jean-Marie Ellenberger (1913–1988) in Sierre (Sainte-Croix church) or Verbier.

In the civil architecture, two hospices, each located at one of the passes leading to Italy, formerly provided food for pilgrims who went to Rome and travelers in general: the Great St. Bernard Hospice and the Simplon Hospice. There are also interesting Roman remains, such as the amphitheater in Martigny. Sion is also a major site of European prehistory. In particular, are the dolmens of Le Petit-Chasseur, a group of large collective burials dating back to the 3rd millennium BC. Bridges are also an important element of the Valais-built landscape. Due to its mountainous terrain which requires crossing many natural obstacles, the canton has several bridges, old or modern, often daring, including the Gueuroz Bridge which was once the highest bridge in Europe, and the Ganter Bridge, on the Simplon road.

Visible from central Valais, the statue of Christ the King in Lens recalls the Catholic tradition of the canton.

Among the most important museums in the canton, the Gianadda Foundation in Martigny attracts many visitors from all over Switzerland and neighboring countries. The canton also owns several large museums in Sion, the Cantonal Museum of Fine Arts, the Cantonal History Museum, and the Cantonal Museum of Natural History. Other museums owned by the canton are the Vine and Wine Museum in Salgesch and the Museum of Traditions and Boats of Lake Geneva in St. Gingolph.

=== Gastronomy ===
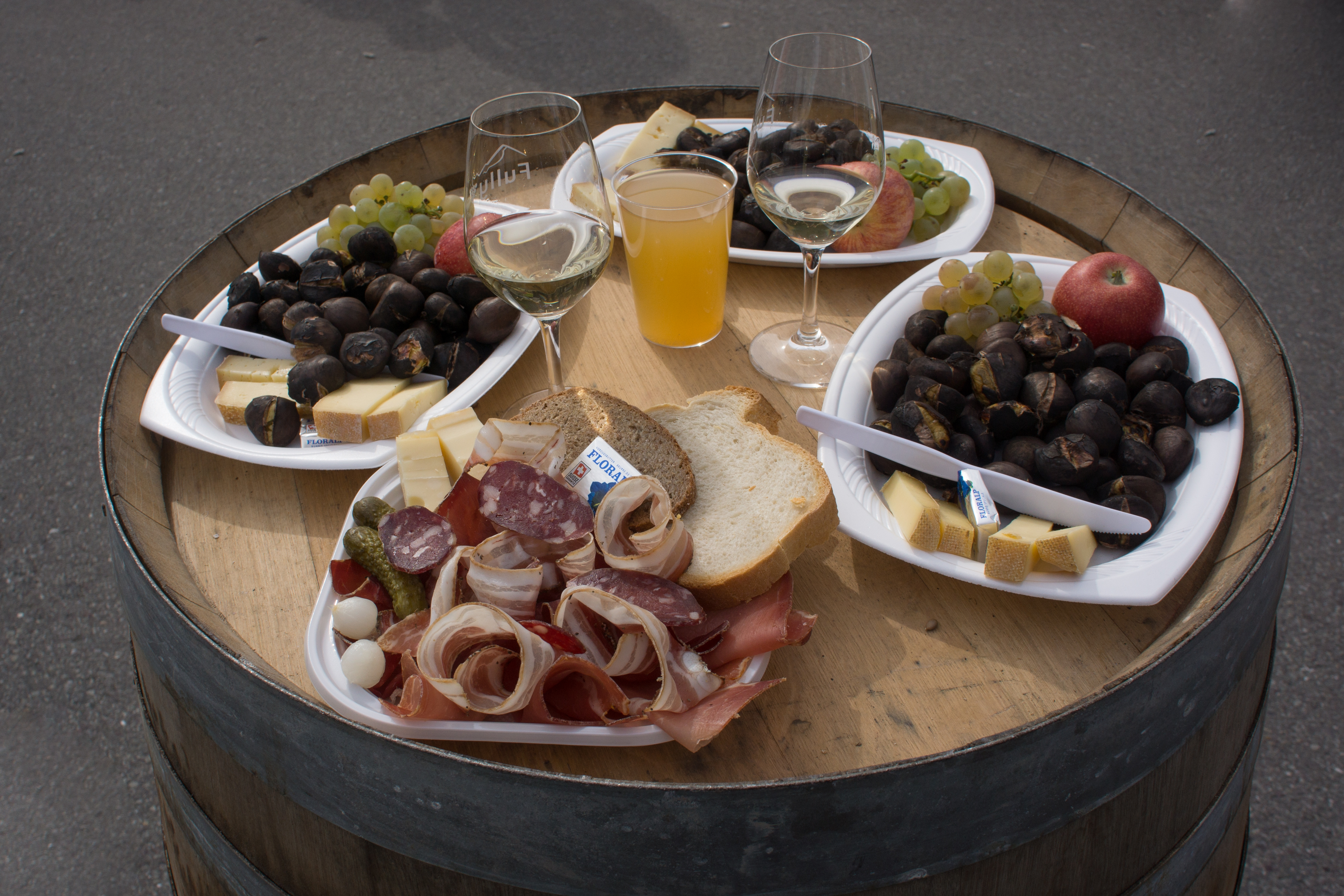
A Brisolée served with local products and wine

Traditional food products of Valais are wines, cheeses, dried meat, and rye bread. Wines are essentially produced in the Rhone Valley, but also in the lateral valleys, up to Visperterminen, which has the highest vineyards in the canton. Wines are typically white. Some of the most popular are Fendant, Petite Arvine, Humagne Blanche, Syrah and Pinot Noir. The numerous cheeses notably include raclette, which is both a variety of cheese and a dish. Along with fondue, the latter has become an emblematic dish associated with mountain culture. Other dishes of Valais include the Cholera, a pastry containing various ingredients, and the Brisolée, a simple dish consisting of roasted chestnuts eaten along with various local cheeses and charcuterie. The latter is often served in autumn near the chestnut groves of the canton.

== See also ==
- Constituent Assembly of Valais
- Franco-Provençal language
- List of mountains of Valais
- Le Nouvelliste
