= Mydicar =

Genetically targeted enzyme replacement therapy

Mydicar is a genetically targeted enzyme replacement therapy being studied for use in patients with severe heart failure. It is designed to increase the level of SERCA2a, a sarcoplasmic endoplasmic reticulum calcium (Ca^{2+}) ATPase found in the membrane of the sarcoplasmic reticulum (SR). The SERCA2a gene is delivered to the heart via an adeno-associated viral vector. Using the α-myosin heavy chain gene promoter in the cardiac muscle cells, also called cardiomyocytes, Mydicar is able to direct the gene expression only to the heart muscle. Mydicar is being tested in a phase 2 study, in which has been compared to a placebo in 39 advanced heart failure patients. Thus far, patients treated with Mydicar have shown a 52% reduction in the risk of worsening heart failure compared to patients treated with the placebo.

== The role of SERCA2a in the heart ==
Normal function of the heart involves proper coordination between the contraction and relaxation of cardiomyocytes. Proper contraction and relaxation depends on the coordinated rise and fall of Ca^{2+} in the cytosol of the cardiomyocytes. The SERCA2a transporter is found in the membrane of the SR and plays an important role in this cycle by removing cytosolic Ca^{2+} from the cardiomyocyte and pumping it back into the SR during relaxation of the heart (diastole). SERCA2a restores SR Ca^{2+} for the next contraction of cardiomyocytes. SERCA2a activity declines in patients experiencing late-stage heart failure. This leads to an above normal amount of cytosolic Ca^{2+} in the cardiomyocytes during diastole. It also results in less Ca^{2+} remaining in the SR for the next contraction of the heart. The altered cycling of Ca^{2+} in cardiomyocytes ultimately leads to improper functioning of the heart, indicating a potentially beneficial effect of gene therapy using Mydicar.

== Benefits ==
Administration of Mydicar occurs via an intracoronary injection of the drug. Mydicar delivers the SERCA2a gene to cardiomyocytes using an adeno-associated viral-vector (AAV). In the cardiomyocytes, the viral vector can insert itself into the genome and increase expression of the SERCA2a protein. Delivering the gene via an AAV is beneficial because it readily infects cardiac tissue and can produce stable, long-term expression of the delivered gene. AAVs also produce less of an immune response than alternative viral vehicles, such as adenoviruses. AAVs have been studied in multiple patients and have not been known to cause human disease.

== The importance of calcium reuptake ==
Proper relaxation of the heart in preparation for the next contraction depends largely on the decline of Ca^{2+} in the cytosol of cardiomyocytes during diastole. Along with impaired contractility, an increased level of cytosolic Ca^{2+} increases the risk of arrhythmias and remodeling of the heart. Excess Ca^{2+} found in the cytosol leads to asynchronous contractions of cardiomyocytes causing tachyarrhythmias. The unusual increase in contraction and faster beating of the heart leads to hypertrophy by increasing the size of the cardiac myocytes in the heart. Excess hypertrophy of the cardiac myocytes leads to further dysfunction of the heart by affecting their ability to relax and contract properly. Administration of Mydicar increasing functioning SERCA2a can assist in lessening these negative effects of an increase in cytosolic Ca^{2+} during diastole by increasing reuptake into the SR.
