= Siegfried Holding AG =

- ISIN: CH0014284498
- Industry: Pharmaceuticals
- Founded: 1873
- Headquarters: Switzerland
- Website: www.siegfried.ch

Siegfried Holding AG is a global life sciences contract development and manufacturing company with production sites in Switzerland, the United States, Malta, China, Germany, France, Spain and Australia. Siegfried Holding AG is listed on the Swiss stock exchange.

== History ==
Siegfried is active in both primary and secondary pharmaceutical manufacturing. The company develops and produces active pharmaceutical ingredients (APIs) for the research-based pharmaceutical industry, as well as related intermediates and controlled substances. It also offers development and manufacturing services for finished pharmaceutical formulations, including sterile filling.

In 1873, pharmacist Samuel Benoni Siegfried and brother-in-law Johann Wilhelm Dürselen founded Siegfried & Dürselen in Zofingen to supply pharmacies. In 1927, Siegfried partners with Gane & Ingram to start Ganes Chemical Works Inc. in New Jersey. On its 100-year anniversary, Siegfried was listed on the Basel Stock Exchange (now the SIX Swiss Exchange) in 1973. In 2001, the holding company was split into Siegfried and Sidroga. A year later, the US company Ganes was acquired by the Siegfried Group and renamed "Siegfried USA Inc."

In 2012, Siegfried entered the sterile filling services industry with the acquisition of Alliance Medical Products based in Irvine, California. In 2013, Siegfried started construction of a new API production facility in Nantong, China. In 2014, Siegfried acquired the contract manufacturing division Hameln Pharma from the Hameln group with their sterile liquid product manufacturing. In May 2015, Siegfried acquired BASF's contract synthesis business and parts of its active pharmaceutical ingredient (API) production operating as Siegfried PharmaChemikalien Minden GmbH, including the production sites in Minden, Evionnaz, and Saint-Vulbas. As of March 31, 2018, Siegfried took over the production facility for finished products (tablets and capsules) including all employees and business contracts from Arena Pharmaceuticals GmbH in Zofingen. Siegfried took over two pharmaceutical production facilities from Novartis in Barberà del Vallès and El Masnou, Spain in 2021. In 2023, Siegfried acquired a majority stake in DINAMIQS, a science-driven CDMO, and in 2024 acquired an early-phase CDMO site in Grafton, Wisconsin (US) from Curia Global. In 2026, Siegfried acquired three drug substances sites in the US and Australia. The Wilmington, Delaware site is a large-scale commercial manufacturing facility for innovative products and controlled substances. The site in Athens, Georgia focuses on preclinical development and manufacturing, and alongside the site in Grafton, forms the Siegfried Acceleration Hub. The Westbury, Australia site operates as Extractas Bioscience, manufacturing purified products, specializing in the commercial extraction of alkaloid raw materials.
