= Dorénaz =

- Municipality
- Flag Coat of arms
- Location of Dorénaz
- Location within Switzerland Location within Canton of Valais
- Coordinates: 46°9′N 7°3′E
- Country: Switzerland
- Canton: Valais
- District: Saint-Maurice

Government
  - Mayor: Daniel Fournier

Area
  - Total: 12.6 km^{2} (4.9 sq mi)
- Elevation: 451 m (1,480 ft)

Population (December 2002)
  - Total: 643
  - Density: 51.0/km^{2} (132/sq mi)
- Time zone: UTC+01:00 (CET)
  - Summer (DST): UTC+02:00 (CEST)
- Postal code: 1905
- SFOS number: 6212
- ISO 3166 code: CH-VS
- Surrounded by: Collonges, Evionnaz, Fully, Martigny, Vernayaz
- Website: www.dorenaz.ch

Dorénaz is a municipality in the district of Saint-Maurice in the canton of Valais in Switzerland.

== History ==
Dorénaz is first mentioned in the 11th and 12th centuries as usque ad frontem Dorone.

== Geography ==
Dorénaz has an area, as of 2011, of 12.5 square kilometers (4.8 mi^{2}). Of this area, 24.3% is used for agricultural purposes, while 60.4% is forested. Of the rest of the land, 3.8% is settled (buildings or roads) and 11.5% is unproductive land.

The municipality is located in the Saint-Maurice district, on the right side of the Rhone.

== Coat of arms ==
The blazon of the municipal coat of arms is Per saltire Gules and Argent two Hammers in chief a Cross bottony and in base an Escallop counterchanged.

== Demographics ==
Dorénaz has a population (as of December 2020) of 1,040. As of 2008, 8.9% of the population are resident foreign nationals. Over the last 10 years (2000–2010) the population has changed at a rate of 17.1%. It has changed at a rate of 20.2% due to migration and at a rate of 1.2% due to births and deaths.

Most of the population (as of 2000) speaks French (582 or 95.9%) as their first language, Portuguese is the second most common (13 or 2.1%) and Italian is the third (7 or 1.2%). There are 2 people who speak German.

As of 2008, the population was 49.6% male and 50.4% female. The population was made up of 303 Swiss men (42.9% of the population) and 48 (6.8%) non-Swiss men. There were 323 Swiss women (45.7%) and 33 (4.7%) non-Swiss women. Of the population in the municipality, 301 or about 49.6% were born in Dorénaz and lived there in 2000. There were 146 or 24.1% who were born in the same canton, while 82 or 13.5% were born somewhere else in Switzerland, and 65 or 10.7% were born outside of Switzerland.

As of 2000, children and teenagers (0–19 years old) make up 29% of the population, while adults (20–64 years old) make up 56.5% and seniors (over 64 years old) make up 14.5%.

As of 2000, there were 261 people who were single and never married in the municipality. There were 272 married individuals, 47 widows or widowers and 27 individuals who are divorced.

As of 2000, there were 181 private households in the municipality, and an average of 2.9 persons per household. There were 48 households that consist of only one person and 24 households with five or more people. In 2000, a total of 178 apartments (57.4% of the total) were permanently occupied, while 104 apartments (33.5%) were seasonally occupied and 28 apartments (9.0%) were empty. As of 2009, the construction rate of new housing units was 11.3 new units per 1000 residents.

The historical population is given in the following chart:

== Politics ==
In the 2007 federal election the most popular party was the FDP which received 33.78% of the vote. The next three most popular parties were the SVP (26.64%), the CVP (25.94%) and the SP (8.02%). In the federal election, a total of 330 votes were cast, and the voter turnout was 68.8%.

In the 2009 Conseil d'État/Staatsrat election a total of 364 votes were cast, of which 36 or about 9.9% were invalid. The voter participation was 76.6%, which is much more than the cantonal average of 54.67%. In the 2007 Swiss Council of States election a total of 322 votes were cast, of which 22 or about 6.8% were invalid. The voter participation was 68.2%, which is much more than the cantonal average of 59.88%.

== Economy ==
As of 2010, Dorénaz had an unemployment rate of 4.9%. As of 2008, there were 20 people employed in the primary economic sector and about 10 businesses involved in this sector. 8 people were employed in the secondary sector and there were 3 businesses in this sector. 70 people were employed in the tertiary sector, with 11 businesses in this sector. There were 271 residents of the municipality who were employed in some capacity, of which females made up 38.7% of the workforce.

In 2008 the total number of full-time equivalent jobs was 78. The number of jobs in the primary sector was 10, all of which were in agriculture. The number of jobs in the secondary sector was 8 of which 5 (62.5%) were in construction. The number of jobs in the tertiary sector was 60. In the tertiary sector; 38 or 63.3% were in wholesale or retail sales or the repair of motor vehicles, 3 or 5.0% were in the movement and storage of goods, 5 or 8.3% were in a hotel or restaurant, 1 was in the information industry, 5 or 8.3% were in education.

In 2000, there were 29 workers who commuted into the municipality and 188 workers who commuted away. The municipality is a net exporter of workers, with about 6.5 workers leaving the municipality for every one entering. Of the working population, 9.6% used public transportation to get to work, and 70.8% used a private car.

== Religion ==
From the 2000 census, 480 or 79.1% were Roman Catholic, while 66 or 10.9% belonged to the Swiss Reformed Church. There was 1 individual who was Jewish, and 10 (or about 1.65% of the population) who were Islamic. There was 1 person who was Buddhist. 36 (or about 5.93% of the population) belonged to no church, are agnostic or atheist, and 13 individuals (or about 2.14% of the population) did not answer the question.

== Education ==
In Dorénaz about 214 or (35.3%) of the population have completed non-mandatory upper secondary education, and 36 or (5.9%) have completed additional higher education (either university or a Fachhochschule). Of the 36 who completed tertiary schooling, 63.9% were Swiss men, 33.3% were Swiss women.

As of 2000, there were 21 students in Dorénaz who came from another municipality, while 60 residents attended schools outside the municipality.
