= Collonges, Switzerland =

Collonges
- Municipality
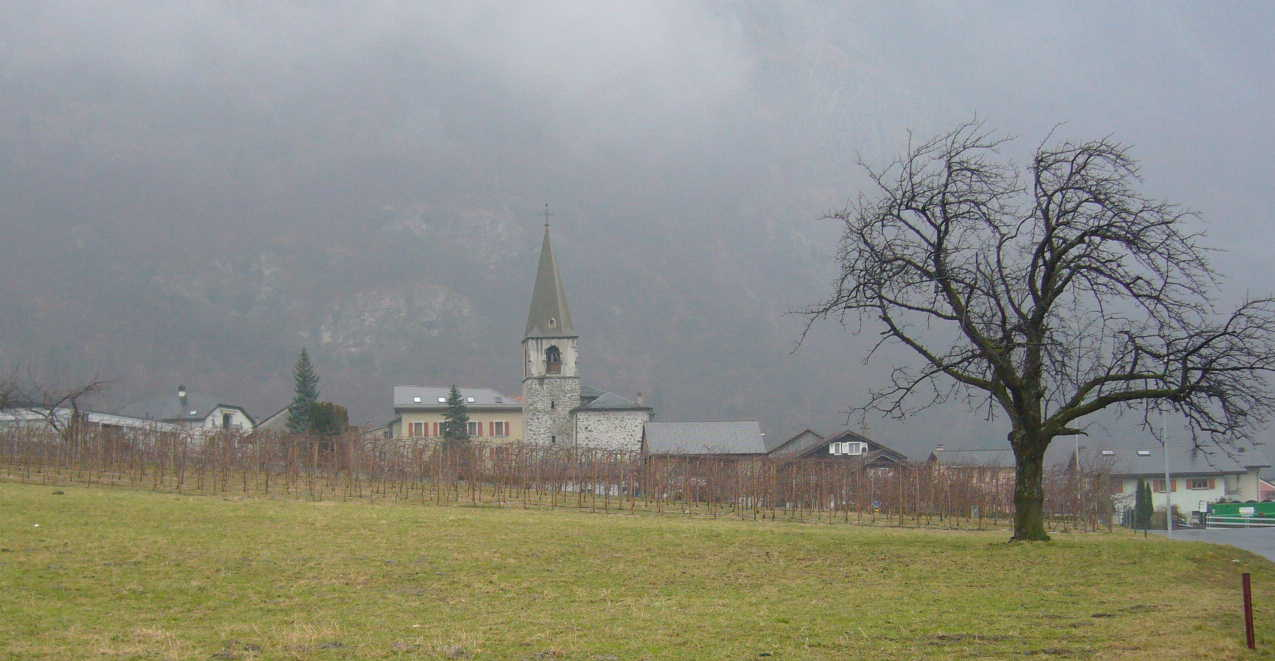
- Collonges village

- Flag Coat of arms
- Location of Collonges
- Location within Switzerland Location within Canton of Valais
- Coordinates: 46°10′N 7°2′E
- Country: Switzerland
- Canton: Valais
- District: Saint-Maurice

Government
  - Mayor: René Jacquier

Area
  - Total: 12.2 km^{2} (4.7 sq mi)
- Elevation: 452 m (1,483 ft)

Population (December 2002)
  - Total: 508
  - Density: 41.6/km^{2} (108/sq mi)
- Time zone: UTC+01:00 (CET)
  - Summer (DST): UTC+02:00 (CEST)
- Postal code: 1903
- SFOS number: 6211
- ISO 3166 code: CH-VS
- Surrounded by: Bex (VD), Dorénaz, Evionnaz, Fully, Lavey-Morcles (VD), Saint-Maurice
- Website: www.collonges.ch

Collonges (French pronunciation: [kɔlɔ̃ʒ]) is a municipality in the district of Saint-Maurice in the canton of Valais in Switzerland.

== History ==
Collonges is first mentioned in 1239 as Colunges. The village of Collonges was built on the site of the former village of Arbignon, which was known as desertum Alpinonis in the 11th and 12th centuries. Arbignon was probably abandoned due to flooding of Aboyeu creek.

== Geography ==
Aerial view by Walter Mittelholzer (1927)

Collonges has an area, as of 2009, of 12.2 square kilometers (4.7 mi^{2}). Of this area, 2.06 km^{2} (0.80 mi^{2}) or 16.9% is used for agricultural purposes, while 6.44 km^{2} (2.49 mi^{2}) or 52.7% is forested. Of the rest of the land, 0.54 km^{2} (0.21 mi^{2}) or 4.4% is settled (buildings or roads), 0.18 km^{2} (0.069 mi^{2}) or 1.5% is either rivers or lakes and 3.02 km^{2} (1.17 mi^{2}) or 24.7% is unproductive land.

Of the built up area, housing and buildings made up 0.9% and transportation infrastructure made up 2.0%. Power and water infrastructure as well as other special developed areas made up 1.1% of the area Out of the forested land, 48.1% of the total land area is heavily forested and 4.3% is covered with orchards or small clusters of trees. Of the agricultural land, 5.2% is used for growing crops and 1.9% is pastures, while 1.1% is used for orchards or vine crops and 8.8% is used for alpine pastures. All the water in the municipality is flowing water. Of the unproductive areas, 10.0% is unproductive vegetation and 14.7% is too rocky for vegetation.

The municipality is located in the Saint-Maurice district, on the right side of the Rhone. The municipality stretches from the valley floor to the Dent-de-Morcles.

== Coat of arms ==
The blazon of the municipal coat of arms is Impalled: 1. Azure, on a Saltire Or five Roses Gules barbed Vert and seeded of the second, 2. Or a Bar wavy Azure in chief three Trefoils slipped Vert in fess.

== Demographics ==
Collonges has a population (as of December 2020) of 832. As of 2008, 10.5% of the population are resident foreign nationals. Over the last 10 years (2000–2010) the population has changed at a rate of 6.5%. It has changed at a rate of 5.5% due to migration and at a rate of 2% due to births and deaths.

Most of the population (as of 2000) speaks French (446 or 91.4%) as their first language, Portuguese is the second most common (20 or 4.1%) and Italian is the third (10 or 2.0%). There are 8 people who speak German and 1 person who speaks Romansh.

As of 2008, the population was 48.1% male and 51.9% female. The population was made up of 229 Swiss men (42.4% of the population) and 31 (5.7%) non-Swiss men. There were 252 Swiss women (46.7%) and 28 (5.2%) non-Swiss women. Of the population in the municipality, 190 or about 38.9% were born in Collonges and lived there in 2000. There were 133 or 27.3% who were born in the same canton, while 78 or 16.0% were born somewhere else in Switzerland, and 77 or 15.8% were born outside of Switzerland.

As of 2000, children and teenagers (0–19 years old) make up 24.4% of the population, while adults (20–64 years old) make up 60.2% and seniors (over 64 years old) make up 15.4%.

As of 2000, there were 179 people who were single and never married in the municipality. There were 253 married individuals, 31 widows or widowers and 25 individuals who are divorced.

As of 2000, there were 198 private households in the municipality, and an average of 2.4 persons per household. There were 56 households that consist of only one person and 10 households with five or more people. In 2000, a total of 183 apartments (77.5% of the total) were permanently occupied, while 42 apartments (17.8%) were seasonally occupied and 11 apartments (4.7%) were empty.

The historical population is given in the following chart:

== Politics ==
In the 2007 federal election the most popular party was the FDP which received 37.87% of the vote. The next three most popular parties were the CVP (28.39%), the SP (15.35%) and the SVP (11.79%). In the federal election, a total of 289 votes were cast, and the voter turnout was 68.8%.

In the 2009 Conseil d'État/Staatsrat election a total of 248 votes were cast, of which 15 or about 6.0% were invalid. The voter participation was 60.6%, which is much more than the cantonal average of 54.67%. In the 2007 Swiss Council of States election a total of 284 votes were cast, of which 13 or about 4.6% were invalid. The voter participation was 67.6%, which is much more than the cantonal average of 59.88%.

== Economy ==
As of 2010, Collonges had an unemployment rate of 7.5%. As of 2008, there were 18 people employed in the primary economic sector and about 6 businesses involved in this sector. 43 people were employed in the secondary sector and there were 7 businesses in this sector. 18 people were employed in the tertiary sector, with 7 businesses in this sector. There were 232 residents of the municipality who were employed in some capacity, of which females made up 37.5% of the workforce.

In 2008 the total number of full-time equivalent jobs was 66. The number of jobs in the primary sector was 12, all of which were in agriculture. The number of jobs in the secondary sector was 41 of which 11 or (26.8%) were in manufacturing and 31 (75.6%) were in construction. The number of jobs in the tertiary sector was 13. In the tertiary sector; 1 was in the sale or repair of motor vehicles, 7 or 53.8% were in a hotel or restaurant, 1 was a technical professional or scientist, 3 or 23.1% were in education.

In 2000, there were 17 workers who commuted into the municipality and 184 workers who commuted away. The municipality is a net exporter of workers, with about 10.8 workers leaving the municipality for every one entering. Of the working population, 11.2% used public transportation to get to work, and 72.4% used a private car.

== Religion ==
From the 2000 census, 386 or 79.1% were Roman Catholic, while 46 or 9.4% belonged to the Swiss Reformed Church. Of the rest of the population, there were 5 members of an Orthodox church (or about 1.02% of the population), and there was 1 individual who belongs to another Christian church. There was 1 individual who was Jewish, and 5 (or about 1.02% of the population) who were Islamic. There were 2 individuals who were Buddhist. 25 (or about 5.12% of the population) belonged to no church, are agnostic or atheist, and 17 individuals (or about 3.48% of the population) did not answer the question.

== Education ==
In Collonges about 183 or (37.5%) of the population have completed non-mandatory upper secondary education, and 29 or (5.9%) have completed additional higher education (either university or a Fachhochschule). Of the 29 who completed tertiary schooling, 72.4% were Swiss men, 17.2% were Swiss women.

As of 2000, there were 31 students in Collonges who came from another municipality, while 54 residents attended schools outside the municipality.
