= Massongex =

- Municipality
- Massongex as seen from Chiètres (Bex)

- Flag Coat of arms
- Location of Massongex
- Location within Switzerland Location within Canton of Valais
- Coordinates: 46°15′N 6°59′E
- Country: Switzerland
- Canton: Valais
- District: Saint-Maurice

Government
  - Mayor: Bernard Moulin

Area
  - Total: 6.6 km^{2} (2.5 sq mi)
- Elevation: 308 m (1,010 ft)

Population (December 2002)
  - Total: 1,534
  - Density: 230/km^{2} (600/sq mi)
- Time zone: UTC+01:00 (CET)
  - Summer (DST): UTC+02:00 (CEST)
- Postal code: 1869
- SFOS number: 6215
- ISO 3166 code: CH-VS
- Surrounded by: Bex (VD), Monthey, Saint-Maurice, Vérossaz
- Website: www.massongex.ch

Massongex (French pronunciation: [masɔ̃ʒɛ]; Arpitan: Massongié) is a municipality in the district of Saint-Maurice, in the canton of Valais, Switzerland.

== History ==
Massongex is first mentioned in 1226 as Bernardus de Massunge.

== Geography ==
Massongex has an area, as of 2009, of 6.6 square kilometers (2.5 mi^{2}). Of this area, 2.23 km^{2} (0.86 mi^{2}) or 33.6% is used for agricultural purposes, while 3.12 km^{2} (1.20 mi^{2}) or 47.1% is forested. Of the rest of the land, 1 km^{2} (0.39 mi^{2}) or 15.1% is settled (buildings or roads), 0.2 km^{2} (0.077 mi^{2}) or 3.0% is either rivers or lakes and 0.04 km^{2} (9.9 acres) or 0.6% is unproductive land.

Of the built up area, industrial buildings made up 1.1% of the total area while housing and buildings made up 6.3% and transportation infrastructure made up 4.8%. Power and water infrastructure as well as other special developed areas made up 2.4% of the area Out of the forested land, 42.5% of the total land area is heavily forested and 4.2% is covered with orchards or small clusters of trees. Of the agricultural land, 20.8% is used for growing crops and 10.4% is pastures and 2.0% is used for alpine pastures. All the water in the municipality is flowing water.

The municipality is located in the Saint-Maurice district, on the left side of the Rhone river. It consists of the village of Massongex and eight hamlets including Daviaz.

== Coat of arms ==
The blazon of the municipal coat of arms is Gules, three Towers Argent masoned, windowed and doored Sable.

== Demographics ==
Massongex has a population (as of December 2020) of 1,923. As of 2008, 16.4% of the population are resident foreign nationals. Over the last 10 years (2000–2010 ) the population has changed at a rate of 2.6%. It has changed at a rate of 8.4% due to migration and at a rate of 4.8% due to births and deaths.

Most of the population (as of 2000) speaks French (1,218 or 92.3%) as their first language, German is the second most common (28 or 2.1%) and Italian is the third (24 or 1.8%).

As of 2008, the population was 50.2% male and 49.8% female. The population was made up of 641 Swiss men (42.0% of the population) and 125 (8.2%) non-Swiss men. There were 643 Swiss women (42.2%) and 116 (7.6%) non-Swiss women. Of the population in the municipality, 434 or about 32.9% were born in Massongex and lived there in 2000. There were 377 or 28.6% who were born in the same canton, while 291 or 22.1% were born somewhere else in Switzerland, and 186 or 14.1% were born outside of Switzerland.

As of 2000, children and teenagers (0–19 years old) make up 27.7% of the population, while adults (20–64 years old) make up 61% and seniors (over 64 years old) make up 11.2%.

As of 2000, there were 557 people who were single and never married in the municipality. There were 652 married individuals, 59 widows or widowers and 51 individuals who are divorced.

As of 2000, there were 522 private households in the municipality, and an average of 2.5 persons per household. There were 157 households that consist of only one person and 39 households with five or more people. In 2000, a total of 490 apartments (76.6% of the total) were permanently occupied, while 130 apartments (20.3%) were seasonally occupied and 20 apartments (3.1%) were empty. As of 2009, the construction rate of new housing units was 9.8 new units per 1000 residents. The vacancy rate for the municipality, in 2010, was 1.79%.

The historical population is given in the following chart:

== Heritage sites of national significance ==
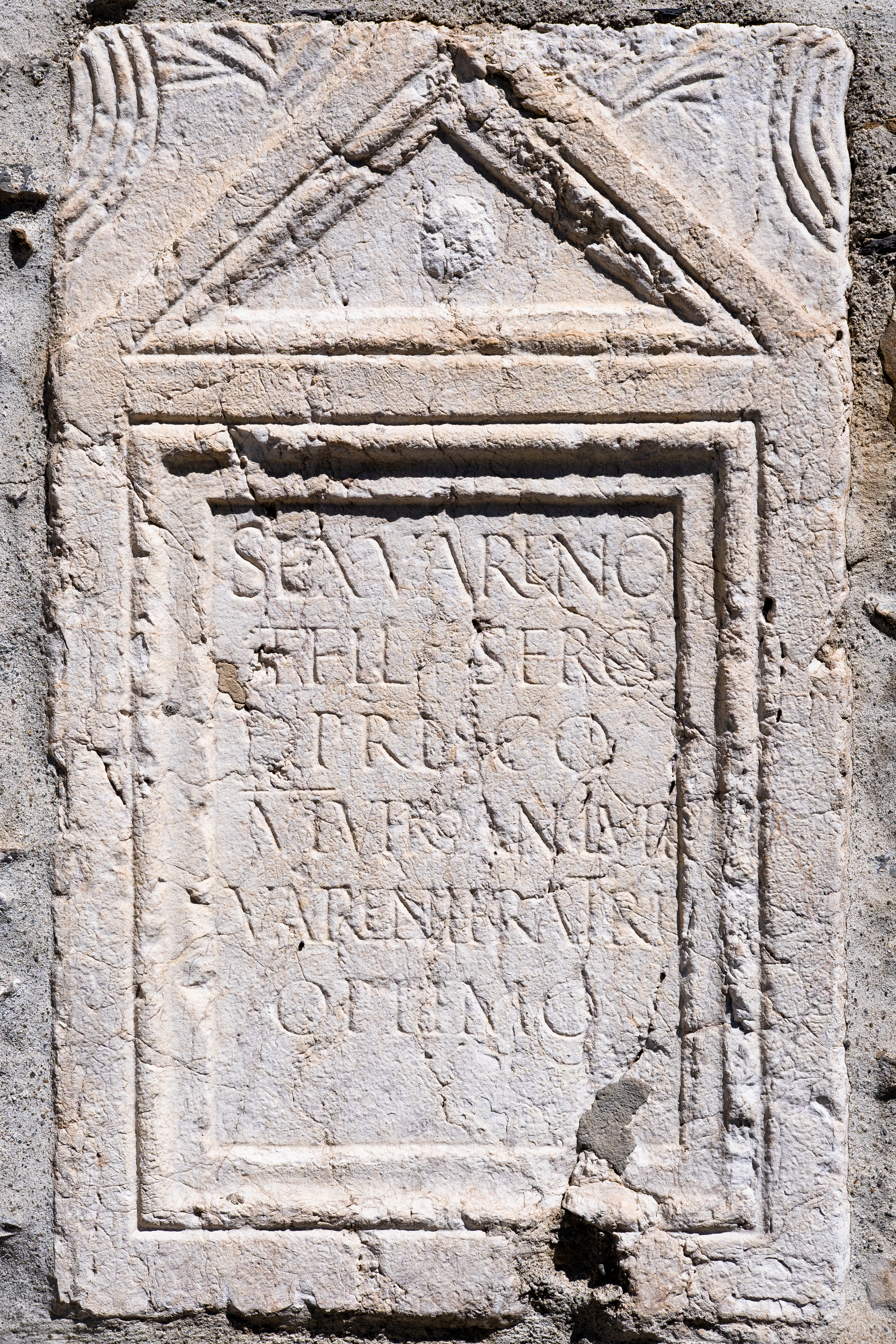
Inscription from Tarnaiae

The Tarnaiae, a Celtic and Gallo-Roman vicus is listed as a Swiss heritage site of national significance.

== Politics ==
In the 2007 federal election the most popular party was the CVP which received 40.12% of the vote. The next three most popular parties were the FDP (19.34%), the SVP (18.48%) and the SP (15.21%). In the federal election, a total of 535 votes were cast, and the voter turnout was 53.7%.

In the 2009 Conseil d'État/Staatsrat election a total of 484 votes were cast, of which 20 or about 4.1% were invalid. The voter participation was 47.8%, which is much less than the cantonal average of 54.67%. In the 2007 Swiss Council of States election a total of 522 votes were cast, of which 30 or about 5.7% were invalid. The voter participation was 53.4%, which is much less than the cantonal average of 59.88%.

== Economy ==
As of 2010, Massongex had an unemployment rate of 4.6%. As of 2008, there were 27 people employed in the primary economic sector and about 12 businesses involved in this sector. 102 people were employed in the secondary sector and there were 21 businesses in this sector. 120 people were employed in the tertiary sector, with 22 businesses in this sector. There were 628 residents of the municipality who were employed in some capacity, of which females made up 39.2% of the workforce.

In 2008 the total number of full-time equivalent jobs was 221. The number of jobs in the primary sector was 20, of which 19 were in agriculture and 1 was in fishing or fisheries. The number of jobs in the secondary sector was 97 of which 23 or (23.7%) were in manufacturing and 63 (64.9%) were in construction. The number of jobs in the tertiary sector was 104. In the tertiary sector; 14 or 13.5% were in wholesale or retail sales or the repair of motor vehicles, 1 was in the movement and storage of goods, 10 or 9.6% were in a hotel or restaurant, 8 or 7.7% were in the information industry, 4 or 3.8% were the insurance or financial industry, 10 or 9.6% were in education and 36 or 34.6% were in health care.

In 2000, there were 139 workers who commuted into the municipality and 528 workers who commuted away. The municipality is a net exporter of workers, with about 3.8 workers leaving the municipality for every one entering. About 3.6% of the workforce coming into Massongex are coming from outside Switzerland. Of the working population, 8.8% used public transportation to get to work, and 73.7% used a private car.

== Religion ==
From the 2000 census, 1,010 or 76.6% were Roman Catholic, while 140 or 10.6% belonged to the Swiss Reformed Church. Of the rest of the population, there were 5 members of an Orthodox church (or about 0.38% of the population), and there were 24 individuals (or about 1.82% of the population) who belonged to another Christian church. There were 2 individuals (or about 0.15% of the population) who were Jewish, and 43 (or about 3.26% of the population) who were Islamic. There were 2 individuals who belonged to another church. 68 (or about 5.16% of the population) belonged to no church, are agnostic or atheist, and 37 individuals (or about 2.81% of the population) did not answer the question.

== Education ==
In Massongex about 477 or (36.2%) of the population have completed non-mandatory upper secondary education, and 103 or (7.8%) have completed additional higher education (either university or a Fachhochschule). Of the 103 who completed tertiary schooling, 58.3% were Swiss men, 25.2% were Swiss women, 9.7% were non-Swiss men and 6.8% were non-Swiss women.

As of 2000, there was one student in Massongex who came from another municipality, while 102 residents attended schools outside the municipality.

Massongex is home to the Bibliothèque communale library. The library has (as of 2008) 4,340 books or other media, and loaned out 3,671 items in the same year. It was open a total of 132 days with average of 6 hours per week during that year.
