= Val-d'Illiez =

- Municipality
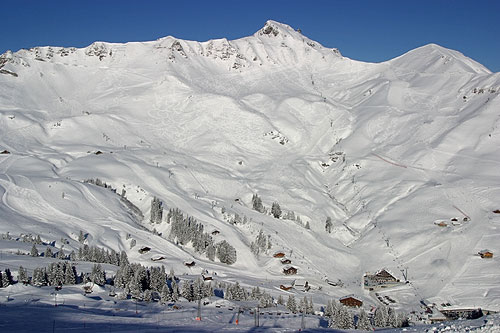
- Les Crosets village

- Flag Coat of arms
- Location of Val-d'Illiez
- Location within Switzerland Location within Canton of Valais
- Coordinates: 46°12′N 6°54′E
- Country: Switzerland
- Canton: Valais
- District: Monthey

Government
  - Mayor: Ismaël Perrin

Area
  - Total: 39.3 km^{2} (15.2 sq mi)
- Elevation: 948 m (3,110 ft)

Population (December 2002)
  - Total: 1,409
  - Density: 35.9/km^{2} (92.9/sq mi)
- Time zone: UTC+01:00 (CET)
  - Summer (DST): UTC+02:00 (CEST)
- Postal code: 1873
- SFOS number: 6157
- ISO 3166 code: CH-VS
- Localities: Champoussin, Fayot, Les Crosets, Play
- Surrounded by: Champéry, Châtel (FR-74), Evionnaz, Mex, Monthey, Montriond (FR-74), Troistorrents, Vérossaz
- Website: www.valdilliez.ch

Val-d'Illiez is a municipality in the district of Monthey in the canton of Valais in Switzerland.

== Geography ==
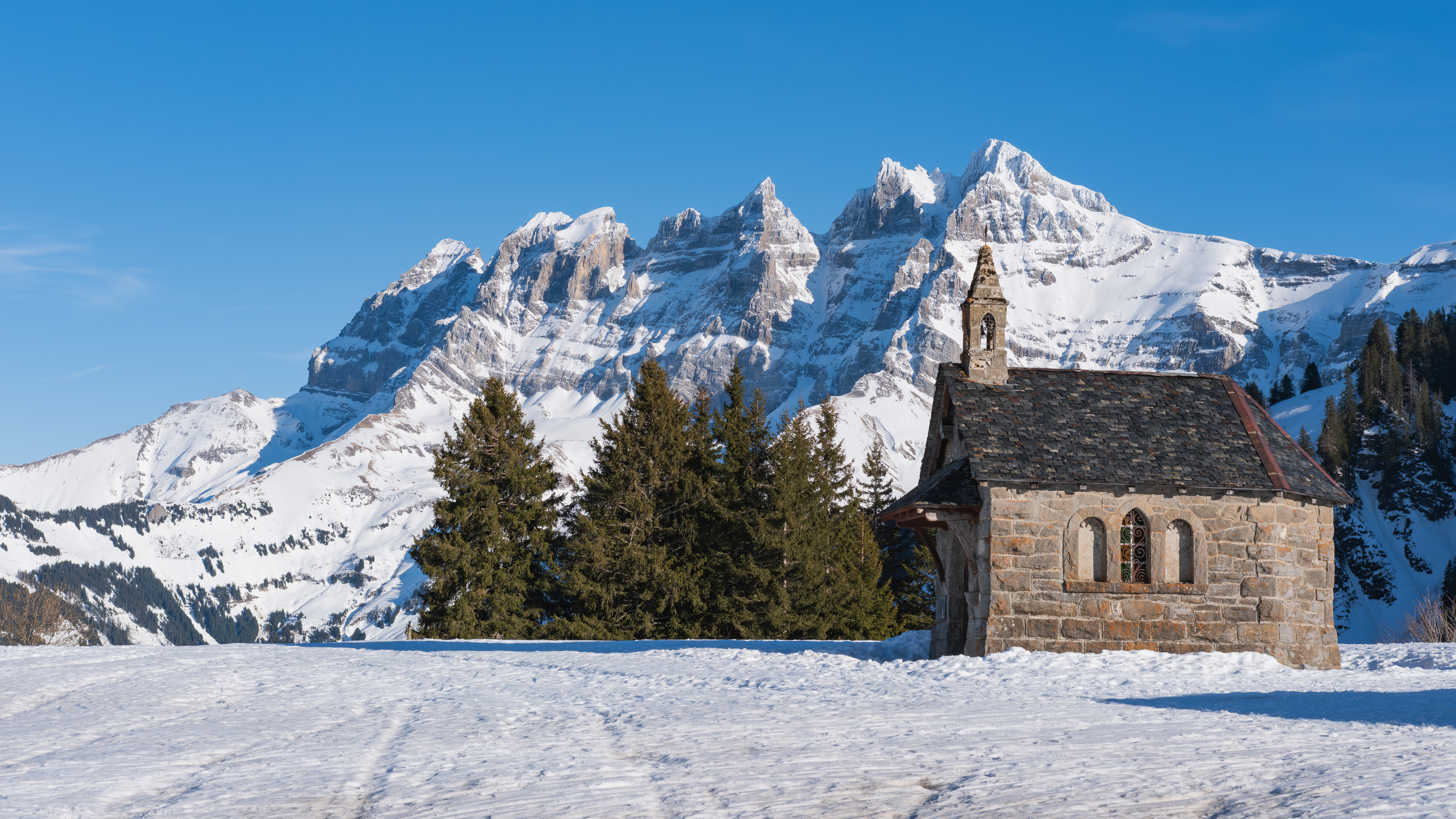
Chapel in Les Crosets with the Dents du Midi in the background

Val-d'Illiez has an area, as of 2009, of 39.3 square kilometers (15.2 mi^{2}). Of this area, 15.04 km^{2} (5.81 mi^{2}) or 38.3% is used for agricultural purposes, while 14.42 km^{2} (5.57 mi^{2}) or 36.7% is forested. Of the rest of the land, 1.62 km^{2} (0.63 mi^{2}) or 4.1% is settled (buildings or roads), 0.21 km^{2} (0.081 mi^{2}) or 0.5% is either rivers or lakes and 7.96 km^{2} (3.07 mi^{2}) or 20.3% is unproductive land.

Of the built up area, housing and buildings made up 1.8% and transportation infrastructure made up 1.8%. Out of the forested land, 29.0% of the total land area is heavily forested and 2.0% is covered with orchards or small clusters of trees. Of the agricultural land, 0.0% is used for growing crops and 9.1% is pastures and 29.2% is used for alpine pastures. All the water in the municipality is flowing water. Of the unproductive areas, 6.7% is unproductive vegetation and 12.6% is too rocky for vegetation.

== Coat of arms ==
The blazon of the municipal coat of arms is Azure, issuant from base mountains Argent, on them issuant from Coupeaux Vert two Houses Gules and three Pine trees Vert trunked proper, in chief a Cornucopia Or flowered Gules. The mountain is the Dents du Midi peaks, which dominate the entire Val-d'Illiez.

== Demographics ==
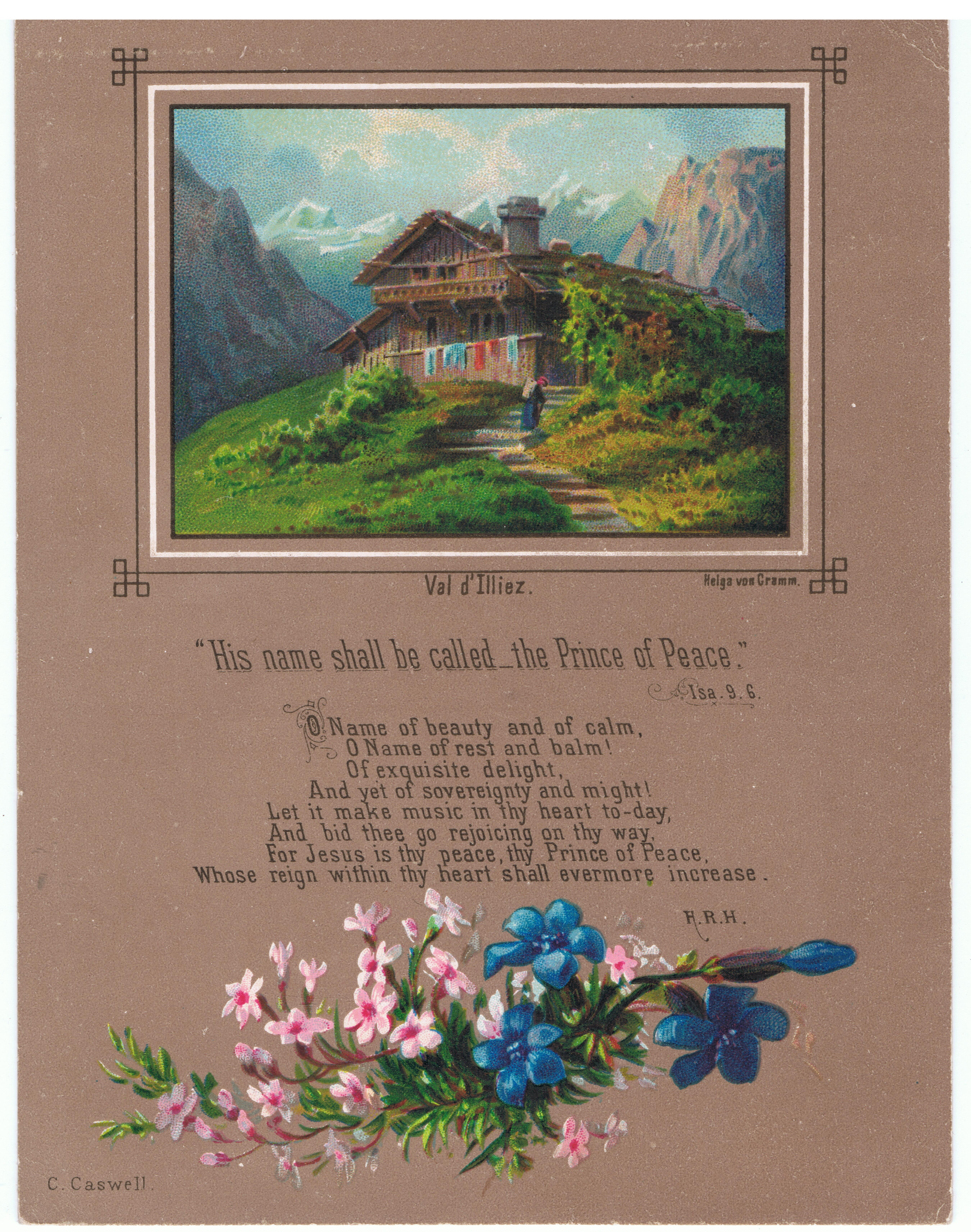
Val d'Illiez, chromolithograph after Helga von Cramm, with prayer by F.R.Havergal. (4.25 x 5.625 inches), c. 1879.

Val-d'Illiez has a population (as of December 2020) of 2,074. As of 2008, 12.6% of the population are resident foreign nationals. Over the last 10 years (2000–2010 ) the population has changed at a rate of 22.5%. It has changed at a rate of 15.4% due to migration and at a rate of 5.3% due to births and deaths.

Most of the population (as of 2000) speaks French (1,351 or 94.6%) as their first language, German is the second most common (25 or 1.8%) and English is the third (15 or 1.1%). There are 9 people who speak Italian and 1 person who speaks Romansh.

As of 2008, the population was 51.5% male and 48.5% female. The population was made up of 739 Swiss men (44.0% of the population) and 127 (7.6%) non-Swiss men. There were 725 Swiss women (43.1%) and 90 (5.4%) non-Swiss women. Of the population in the municipality, 764 or about 53.5% were born in Val-d'Illiez and lived there in 2000. There were 201 or 14.1% who were born in the same canton, while 219 or 15.3% were born somewhere else in Switzerland, and 207 or 14.5% were born outside of Switzerland.

As of 2000, children and teenagers (0–19 years old) make up 21.8% of the population, while adults (20–64 years old) make up 63.9% and seniors (over 64 years old) make up 14.3%.

As of 2000, there were 607 people who were single and never married in the municipality. There were 697 married individuals, 73 widows or widowers and 51 individuals who are divorced.

As of 2000, there were 554 private households in the municipality, and an average of 2.4 persons per household. There were 167 households that consist of only one person and 31 households with five or more people. In 2000, a total of 520 apartments (36.6% of the total) were permanently occupied, while 813 apartments (57.3%) were seasonally occupied and 87 apartments (6.1%) were empty. As of 2009, the construction rate of new housing units was 19 new units per 1000 residents. The vacancy rate for the municipality, in 2010, was 0.5%.

The historical population is given in the following chart:

== Heritage sites of national significance ==
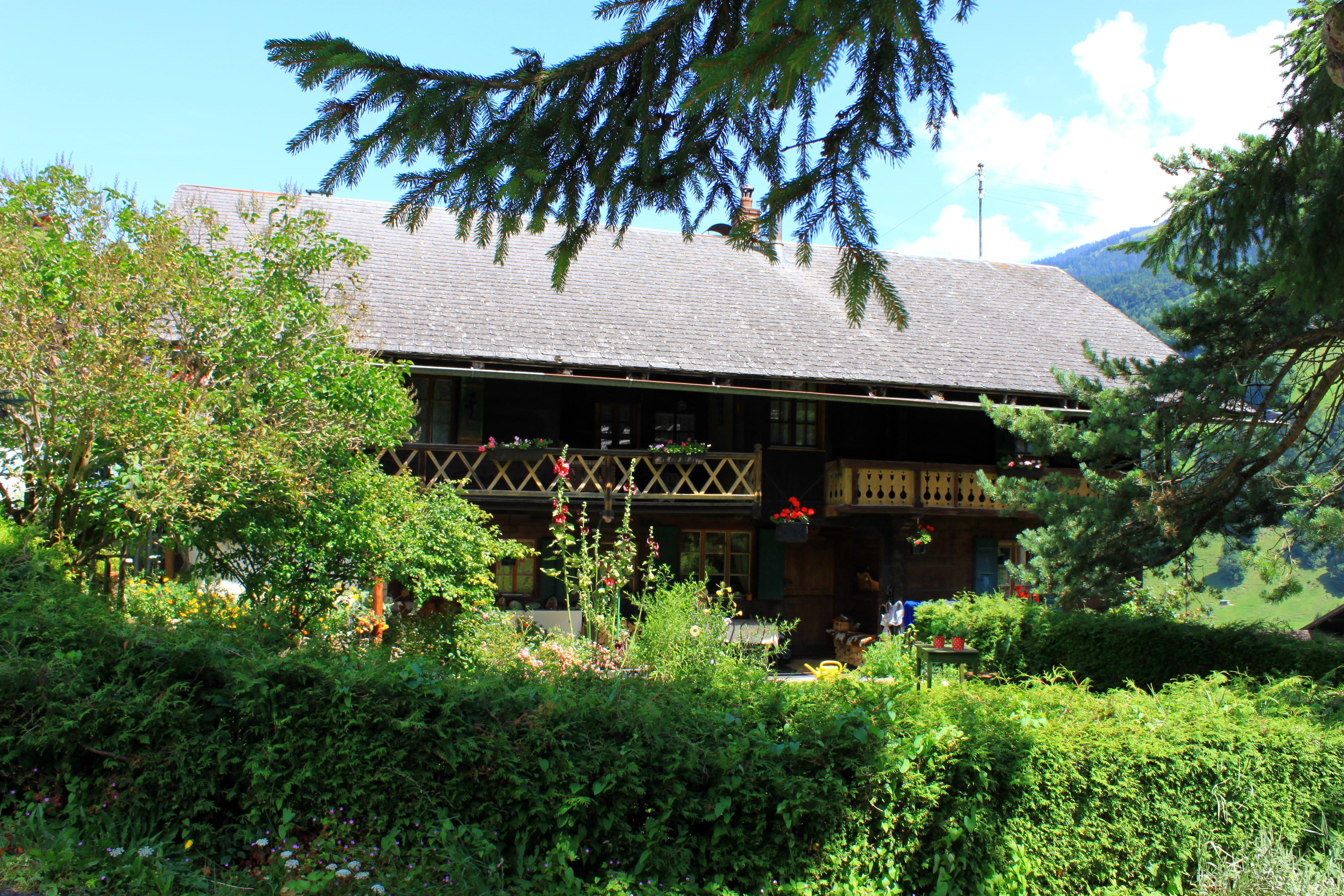

The Maison D’Habitation is listed as a Swiss heritage site of national significance.

== Twin Town ==
Val-d'Illiez is twinned with the town of St-Jean-des-Champas, France.

== Politics ==
In the 2007 federal election the most popular party was the CVP which received 39.47% of the vote. The next three most popular parties were the SVP (32.77%), the FDP (15.55%) and the SP (6.82%). In the federal election, a total of 643 votes were cast, and the voter turnout was 54.1%.

In the 2009 Conseil d'Etat/Staatsrat election a total of 609 votes were cast, of which 30 or about 4.9% were invalid. The voter participation was 52.7%, which is similar to the cantonal average of 54.67%. In the 2007 Swiss Council of States election a total of 634 votes were cast, of which 48 or about 7.6% were invalid. The voter participation was 54.6%, which is much less than the cantonal average of 59.88%.

== Economy ==
As of 2010, Val-d'Illiez had an unemployment rate of 3%. As of 2008, there were 102 people employed in the primary economic sector and about 51 businesses involved in this sector. 84 people were employed in the secondary sector and there were 24 businesses in this sector. 229 people were employed in the tertiary sector, with 56 businesses in this sector. There were 776 residents of the municipality who were employed in some capacity, of which females made up 39.7% of the workforce.

In 2008 the total number of full-time equivalent jobs was 333. The number of jobs in the primary sector was 62, of which 54 were in agriculture and 8 were in forestry or lumber production. The number of jobs in the secondary sector was 77 of which 14 or (18.2%) were in manufacturing and 63 (81.8%) were in construction. The number of jobs in the tertiary sector was 194. In the tertiary sector; 19 or 9.8% were in wholesale or retail sales or the repair of motor vehicles, 48 or 24.7% were in the movement and storage of goods, 44 or 22.7% were in a hotel or restaurant, 5 or 2.6% were in the information industry, 9 or 4.6% were the insurance or financial industry, 12 or 6.2% were technical professionals or scientists, 8 or 4.1% were in education.

In 2000, there were 58 workers who commuted into the municipality and 407 workers who commuted away. The municipality is a net exporter of workers, with about 7.0 workers leaving the municipality for every one entering. Of the working population, 6.6% used public transportation to get to work, and 67.7% used a private car.

== Religion ==
From the 2000 census, 1,140 or 79.8% were Roman Catholic, while 132 or 9.2% belonged to the Swiss Reformed Church. Of the rest of the population, there was 1 member of an Orthodox church, there were 2 individuals (or about 0.14% of the population) who belonged to the Christian Catholic Church, and there were 14 individuals (or about 0.98% of the population) who belonged to another Christian church. There were 6 (or about 0.42% of the population) who were Islamic. There were 4 individuals who belonged to another church. 79 (or about 5.53% of the population) belonged to no church, are agnostic or atheist, and 56 individuals (or about 3.92% of the population) did not answer the question.

== Education ==
In Val-d'Illiez about 441 or (30.9%) of the population have completed non-mandatory upper secondary education, and 158 or (11.1%) have completed additional higher education (either university or a Fachhochschule). Of the 158 who completed tertiary schooling, 50.0% were Swiss men, 22.2% were Swiss women, 13.3% were non-Swiss men and 14.6% were non-Swiss women.

As of 2000, there were 5 students in Val-d'Illiez who came from another municipality, while 96 residents attended schools outside the municipality.

Val-d'Illiez is home to the Bibliothèque communale et scolaire library. The library has (as of 2008) 3,100 books or other media, and loaned out 2,100 items in the same year. It was open a total of 130 days with average of 6 hours per week during that year.
