= Giffre Massif =

Coordinates: 46.093°N 6.8437°E

Map of the Giffre Massif.

The Giffre Massif is a mountainous massif in the northern French and Swiss Pre-Alps.

== Location ==
The massif can be broken down as follows:

- the Dents du Midi chain, the northern part of the massif, facing the Bernese Alps;
- the Haut-Giffre Massif, to the east, facing the Aiguilles Rouges and the Mont Blanc massif;
- the Sixt Massif, to the north-west, facing the Chablais Alps;
- the Faucigny Massif, to the south-west, facing the Aravis range.

== History ==
The Giffre Massif was home to groups of maquis during the Second World War. German repression took place there, particularly during the episode known as the "Tragedy of the Giffre", on April 1, 1944 at Marignier, where the occupier, assisted by his staff, dismantled a group of resistance fighters at the Giffre factory: four workers were shot, twenty-four were deported to Germany - ten of them died in the Buchenwald camp.
