= Mex, Valais =

Mex
- Former municipality
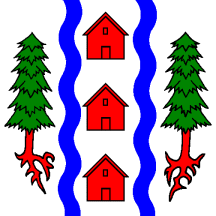
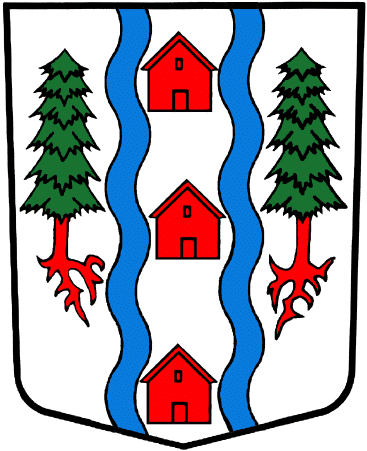
- Flag Coat of arms
- Location of Mex
- Location within Switzerland Location within Canton of Valais
- Coordinates: 46°11′N 7°0′E
- Country: Switzerland
- Canton: Valais
- District: Saint-Maurice

Government
  - Mayor: Madeline Heiniger

Area
  - Total: 7.9 km^{2} (3.1 sq mi)
- Elevation: 1,118 m (3,668 ft)
- Highest elevation (Cime de l'Est): 3,180 m (10,430 ft)
- Lowest elevation (hameau des Cases): 500 m (1,600 ft)

Population (2010)
  - Total: 154
  - Density: 19/km^{2} (50/sq mi)
- Time zone: UTC+01:00 (CET)
  - Summer (DST): UTC+02:00 (CEST)
- Postal code: 1891
- SFOS number: 6216
- ISO 3166 code: CH-VS
- Surrounded by: Evionnaz, Saint-Maurice, Val-d'Illiez, Vérossaz
- Twin towns: Saint-Alban-les-Eaux (France)
- Website: www.mex-vs.ch

Mex is a former municipality in the district of Saint-Maurice, in the canton of Valais, Switzerland. On 1 January 2013 the former municipality of Mex (VS) merged into the municipality of Saint-Maurice.

== History ==
Mex is first mentioned in 1298 as Meys.

== Geography ==
Before the merger, Mex had a total area of 7.9 km^{2} (3.1 mi^{2}). Of this area, 1.02 km^{2} (0.39 mi^{2}) or 12.9% is used for agricultural purposes, while 3.87 km^{2} (1.49 mi^{2}) or 48.9% is forested. Of the rest of the land, 0.2 km^{2} (0.077 mi^{2}) or 2.5% is settled (buildings or roads), 0.14 km^{2} (35 acres) or 1.8% is either rivers or lakes and 2.68 km^{2} (1.03 mi^{2}) or 33.8% is unproductive land.

Of the built-up area, housing and buildings made up 0.9% and transportation infrastructure made up 0.6%. Out of the forested land, 42.9% of the total land area is heavily forested and 3.2% is covered with orchards or small clusters of trees. Of the agricultural land, 0.0% is used for growing crops and 2.3% is pastures and 10.6% is used for alpine pastures. All the water in the municipality is flowing water. Of the unproductive areas, 9.5% is unproductive vegetation and 24.4% is too rocky for vegetation.

The municipality is located in the Saint-Maurice district, on a high plateau (1,146 m [3,760 ft]) left of the Rhone river and east of the Dents du Midi mountain. It consists of the linear village of Mex.

== Coat of arms ==
The blazon of the municipal coat of arms is Argent, between two Pine Trees Vert eradicated Gules and as many pallets wavy Azure three Houses Gules.

== Demographics ==
Mex had a population (as of 2010) of 154. As of 2008, 15.6% of the population are resident foreign nationals. Over the last 10 years (2000–2010 ) the population has changed at a rate of 25.4%. It has changed at a rate of 26.3% due to migration and at a rate of 5.9% due to births and deaths.

Most of the population (as of 2000) speaks French (100 or 94.3%) as their first language with the rest speaking German

As of 2008, the population was 47.3% male and 52.7% female. The population was made up of 61 Swiss men (41.2% of the population) and 9 (6.1%) non-Swiss men. There were 68 Swiss women (45.9%) and 10 (6.8%) non-Swiss women. Of the population in the municipality, 43 or about 40.6% were born in Mex and lived there in 2000. There were 12 or 11.3% who were born in the same canton, while 25 or 23.6% were born somewhere else in Switzerland, and 16 or 15.1% were born outside of Switzerland.

As of 2000, children and teenagers (0–19 years old) make up 34.9% of the population, while adults (20–64 years old) make up 52.8% and seniors (over 64 years old) make up 12.3%.

As of 2000, there were 55 people who were single and never married in the municipality. There were 45 married individuals, 5 widows or widowers and 1 individuals who are divorced.

As of 2000, there were 34 private households in the municipality, and an average of 2.5 persons per household. There were 10 households that consist of only one person and 5 households with five or more people. In 2000, a total of 34 apartments (42.5% of the total) were permanently occupied, while 39 apartments (48.8%) were seasonally occupied and 7 apartments (8.8%) were empty. As of 2009, the construction rate of new housing units was 54.1 new units per 1000 residents. The vacancy rate for the municipality, in 2010, was 3.41%.

The historical population is given in the following chart:

== Politics ==
In the 2007 federal election the most popular party was the CVP which received 39.43% of the vote. The next three most popular parties were the SVP (18.29%), the Green Party (14.57%) and the SP (11.43%). In the federal election, a total of 55 votes were cast, and the voter turnout was 51.9%.

In the 2009 Conseil d'Etat/Staatsrat election a total of 51 votes were cast, of which 10 or about 19.6% were invalid. The voter participation was 53.7%, which is similar to the cantonal average of 54.67%. In the 2007 Swiss Council of States election a total of 51 votes were cast, of which 2 or about 3.9% were invalid. The voter participation was 58.6%, which is similar to the cantonal average of 59.88%.

== Economy ==
As of 2010, Mex had an unemployment rate of 10.1%. As of 2008, there were 2 people employed in the primary economic sector and about 2 businesses involved in this sector. No one was employed in the secondary sector. 27 people were employed in the tertiary sector, with 4 businesses in this sector. There were 48 residents of the municipality who were employed in some capacity, of which females made up 41.7% of the workforce.

In 2008 the total number of full-time equivalent jobs was 21. The number of jobs in the primary sector was 1, all of which were in agriculture. There were no jobs in the secondary sector. The number of jobs in the tertiary sector was 20. In the tertiary sector; 2 or 10.0% were in a hotel or restaurant, 2 or 10.0% were in education and 16 or 80.0% were in health care.

In 2000, there were 15 workers who commuted into the municipality and 31 workers who commuted away. The municipality is a net exporter of workers, with about 2.1 workers leaving the municipality for every one entering. Of the working population, 8.3% used public transportation to get to work, and 66.7% used a private car.

== Religion ==
From the 2000 census, 71 or 67.0% were Roman Catholic, while 11 or 10.4% belonged to the Swiss Reformed Church. Of the rest of the population, there were 30 individuals (or about 28.30% of the population) who belonged to another Christian church. 9 (or about 8.49% of the population) belonged to no church, are agnostic or atheist.

== Education ==
In Mex about 24 or (22.6%) of the population have completed non-mandatory upper secondary education, and 14 or (13.2%) have completed additional higher education (either university or a Fachhochschule). Of the 14 who completed tertiary schooling, 64.3% were Swiss men, 28.6% were Swiss women.

As of 2000, there was one student in Mex who came from another municipality, while 12 residents attended schools outside the municipality.

Mex is home to the Bibliothèque de Mex library. The library has (as of 2008) 5,740 books or other media, and loaned out 2,193 items in the same year. It was open a total of 34 days with average of 6 hours per week during that year.
