= Evionnaz =

- Municipality
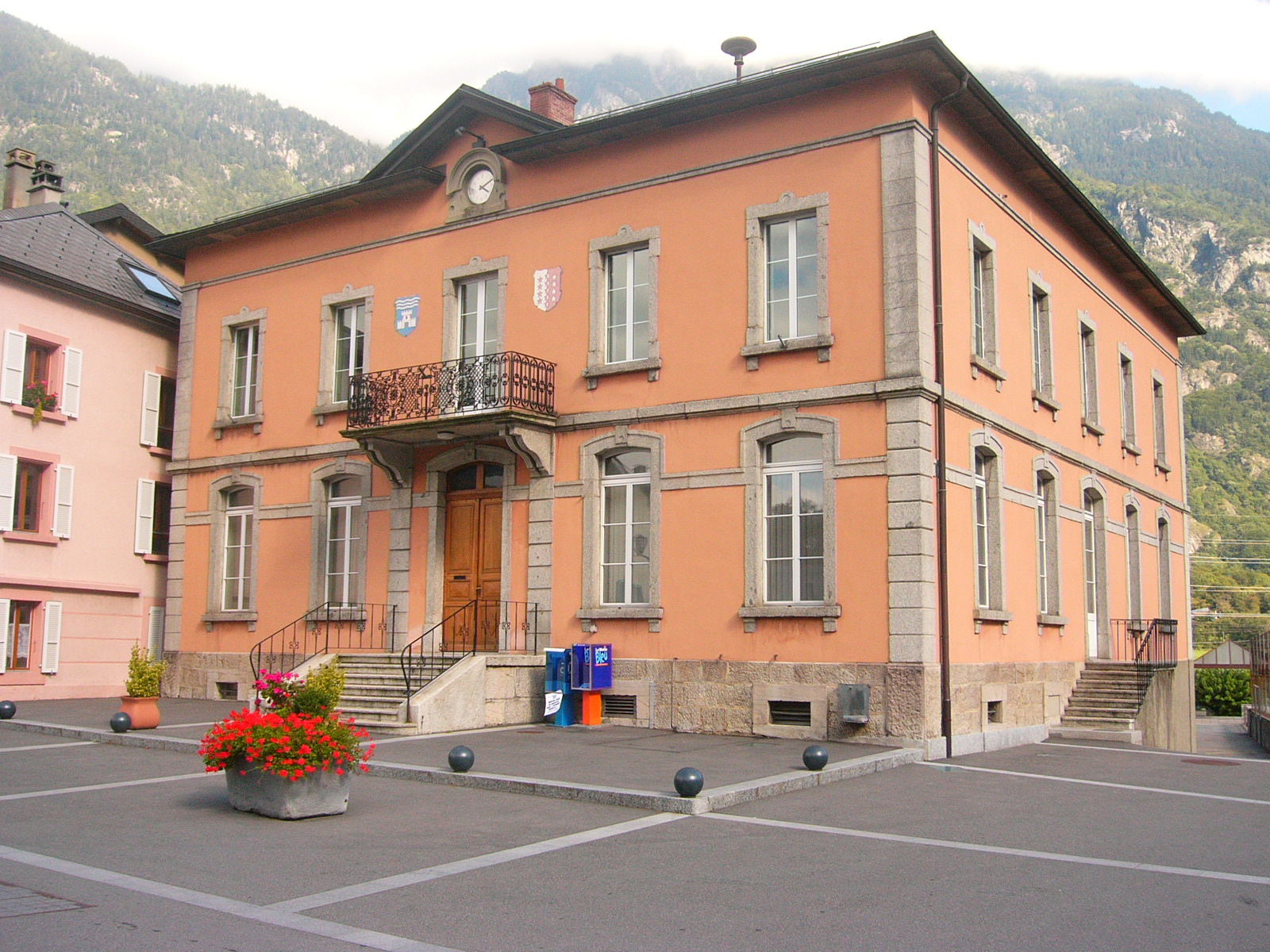

- Flag Coat of arms
- Location of Evionnaz
- Location within Switzerland Location within Canton of Valais
- Coordinates: 46°11′N 7°1′E
- Country: Switzerland
- Canton: Valais
- District: Saint-Maurice

Government
  - Mayor: Gilbert Jacquemoud

Area
  - Total: 48.0 km^{2} (18.5 sq mi)
- Elevation: 469 m (1,539 ft)

Population (December 2002)
  - Total: 1,010
  - Density: 21.0/km^{2} (54.5/sq mi)
- Time zone: UTC+01:00 (CET)
  - Summer (DST): UTC+02:00 (CEST)
- Postal code: 1902
- SFOS number: 6213
- ISO 3166 code: CH-VS
- Surrounded by: Champéry, Collonges, Dorénaz, Mex, Saint-Maurice, Salvan, Sixt-Fer-à-Cheval (FR-74), Val-d'Illiez, Vernayaz
- Website: www.evionnaz.ch

Evionnaz is a municipality in the district of Saint-Maurice in the canton of Valais in Switzerland.

== History ==
Evionnaz is first mentioned in 1263 as Eviona. It became an independent municipality in 1822, when it separated from Saint-Maurice.

== Geography ==
Aerial view (1949)

Evionnaz has an area, as of 2011, of 48 square kilometers (19 mi^{2}). Of this area, 12.2% is used for agricultural purposes, while 19.0% is forested. Of the rest of the land, 2.0% is settled (buildings or roads) and 66.8% is unproductive land.

The municipality is located in the Saint-Maurice district. The large district stretches from the left bank of the Rhone river over to the Dents-du-Midi mountains. It consists of the village of Evionnaz and the hamlets of La Balmaz and La Rasse.

== Coat of arms ==
The blazon of the municipal coat of arms is Azure City Walls embattled Argent with entrance towered and embattled and with a window Sable, in chief three Barrulets wavy of the second.

== Demographics ==
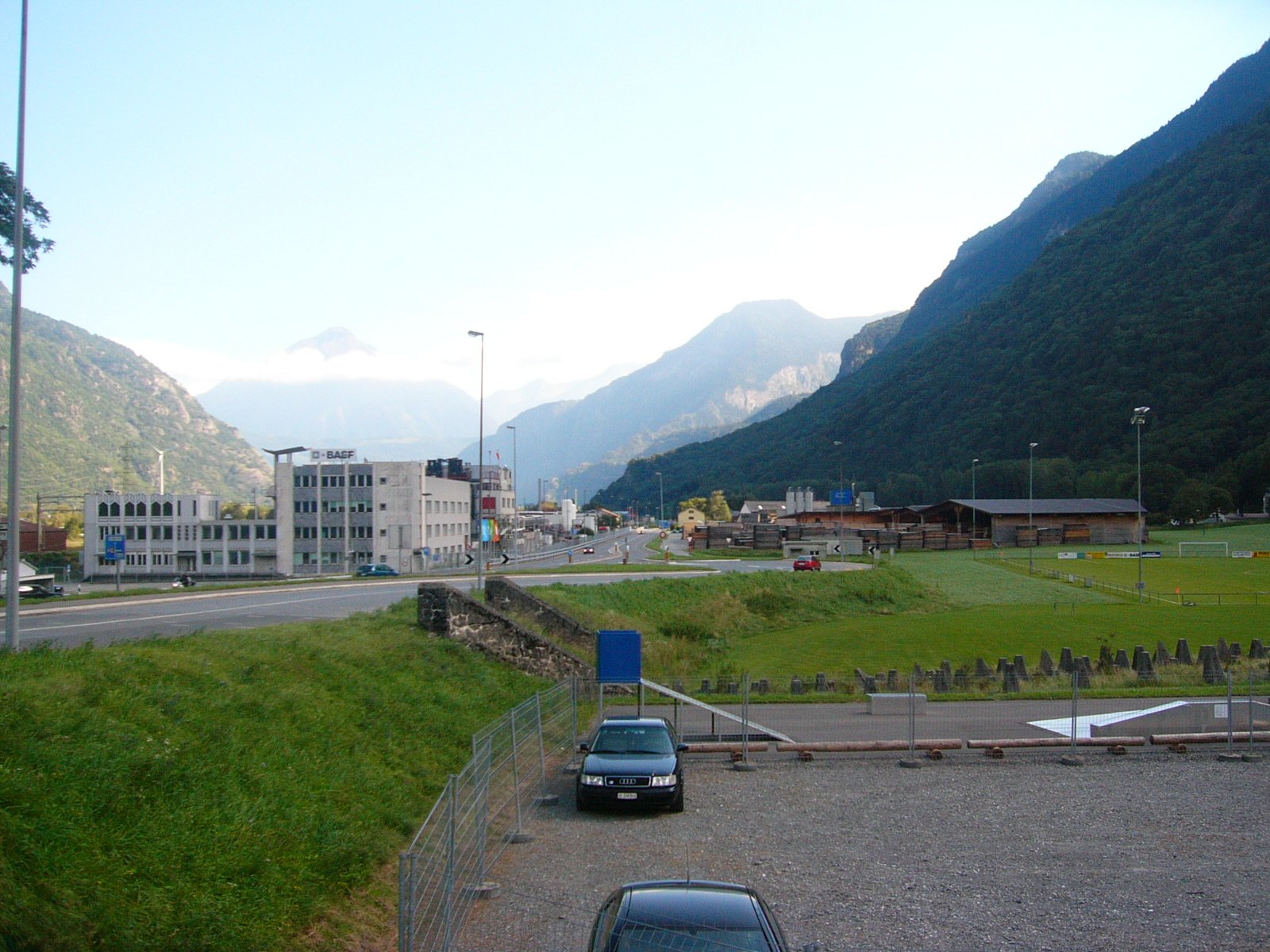
Industrial zone of Evionnaz

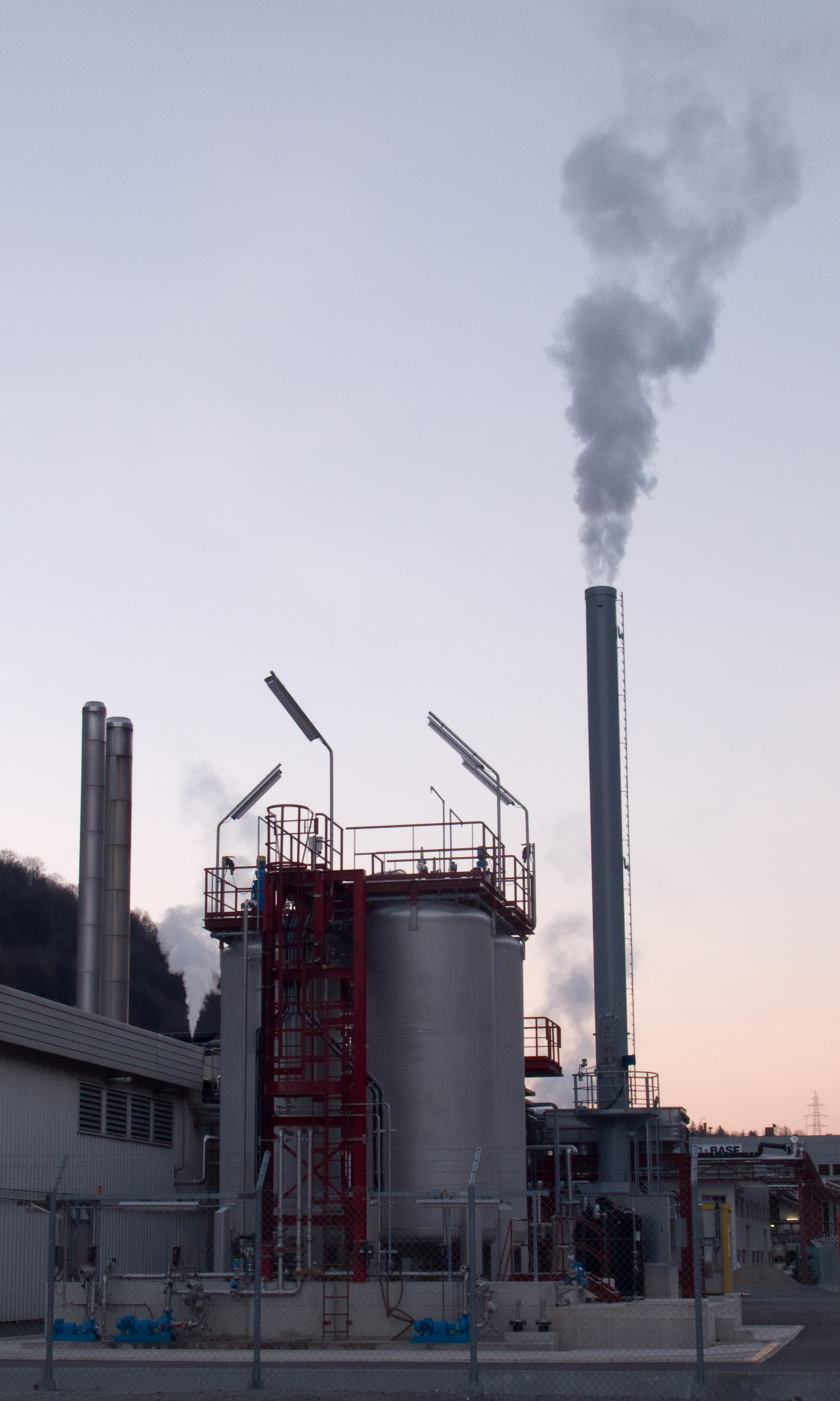
Siegfried plant in Evionnaz

Evionnaz has a population (as of December 2020) of 1,345. As of 2008, 14.0% of the population are resident foreign nationals. Over the last 10 years (2000–2010 ) the population has changed at a rate of 7.4%. It has changed at a rate of 10.5% due to migration and at a rate of 3% due to births and deaths.

Most of the population (as of 2000) speaks French (850 or 91.4%) as their first language, Portuguese is the second most common (31 or 3.3%) and German is the third (12 or 1.3%). There are 12 people who speak Italian.

As of 2008, the population was 51.1% male and 48.9% female. The population was made up of 462 Swiss men (43.5% of the population) and 81 (7.6%) non-Swiss men. There were 450 Swiss women (42.4%) and 69 (6.5%) non-Swiss women. Of the population in the municipality, 431 or about 46.3% were born in Evionnaz and lived there in 2000. There were 242 or 26.0% who were born in the same canton, while 127 or 13.7% were born somewhere else in Switzerland, and 118 or 12.7% were born outside of Switzerland.

As of 2000, children and teenagers (0–19 years old) make up 28.3% of the population, while adults (20–64 years old) make up 56.5% and seniors (over 64 years old) make up 15.3%.

As of 2000, there were 397 people who were single and never married in the municipality. There were 428 married individuals, 57 widows or widowers and 48 individuals who are divorced.

As of 2000, there were 362 private households in the municipality, and an average of 2.5 persons per household. There were 113 households that consist of only one person and 41 households with five or more people. In 2000, a total of 348 apartments (84.1% of the total) were permanently occupied, while 42 apartments (10.1%) were seasonally occupied and 24 apartments (5.8%) were empty. As of 2009, the construction rate of new housing units was 5.6 new units per 1000 residents. The vacancy rate for the municipality, in 2010, was 0.65%.

The historical population is given in the following chart:

== Sights ==
The entire village of Evionnaz is designated as part of the Inventory of Swiss Heritage Sites.

== Politics ==
In the 2007 federal election the most popular party was the CVP which received 37.12% of the vote. The next three most popular parties were the SP (20.87%), the SVP (16.92%) and the FDP (16.18%). In the federal election, a total of 449 votes were cast, and the voter turnout was 60.9%.

In the 2009 Conseil d'État/Staatsrat election a total of 411 votes were cast, of which 12 or about 2.9% were invalid. The voter participation was 56.0%, which is similar to the cantonal average of 54.67%. In the 2007 Swiss Council of States election a total of 446 votes were cast, of which 21 or about 4.7% were invalid. The voter participation was 61.2%, which is similar to the cantonal average of 59.88%.

== Economy ==
As of 2010, Evionnaz had an unemployment rate of 6.2%. As of 2008, there were 17 people employed in the primary economic sector and about 5 businesses involved in this sector. 459 people were employed in the secondary sector and there were 15 businesses in this sector. 132 people were employed in the tertiary sector, with 24 businesses in this sector. There were 429 residents of the municipality who were employed in some capacity, of which females made up 40.8% of the workforce.

In 2008 the total number of full-time equivalent jobs was 558. The number of jobs in the primary sector was 14, of which 9 were in agriculture and 5 were in forestry or lumber production. The number of jobs in the secondary sector was 439 of which 404 or (92.0%) were in manufacturing and 35 (8.0%) were in construction. The number of jobs in the tertiary sector was 105. In the tertiary sector; 47 or 44.8% were in wholesale or retail sales or the repair of motor vehicles, 4 or 3.8% were in the movement and storage of goods, 20 or 19.0% were in a hotel or restaurant, 4 or 3.8% were the insurance or financial industry, 4 or 3.8% were in education and 4 or 3.8% were in health care.

In 2000, there were 430 workers who commuted into the municipality and 288 workers who commuted away. The municipality is a net importer of workers, with about 1.5 workers entering the municipality for every one leaving. Of the working population, 10.7% used public transportation to get to work, and 70.4% used a private car.

== Religion ==
From the 2000 census, 770 or 82.8% were Roman Catholic, while 58 or 6.2% belonged to the Swiss Reformed Church. Of the rest of the population, there were 14 members of an Orthodox church (or about 1.51% of the population), and there were 31 individuals (or about 3.33% of the population) who belonged to another Christian church. There were 19 (or about 2.04% of the population) who were Islamic. There was 1 person who was Buddhist and 1 person who was Hindu. 38 (or about 4.09% of the population) belonged to no church, are agnostic or atheist, and 13 individuals (or about 1.40% of the population) did not answer the question.

== Education ==
In Evionnaz about 355 or (38.2%) of the population have completed non-mandatory upper secondary education, and 59 or (6.3%) have completed additional higher education (either university or a Fachhochschule). Of the 59 who completed tertiary schooling, 67.8% were Swiss men, 18.6% were Swiss women and 8.5% were non-Swiss women.

As of 2000, there were 28 students in Evionnaz who came from another municipality, while 91 residents attended schools outside the municipality.

== Notable people ==
- Mireille Richard (b. 1989), ski mountaineer.
