= Vérossaz =

- Municipality
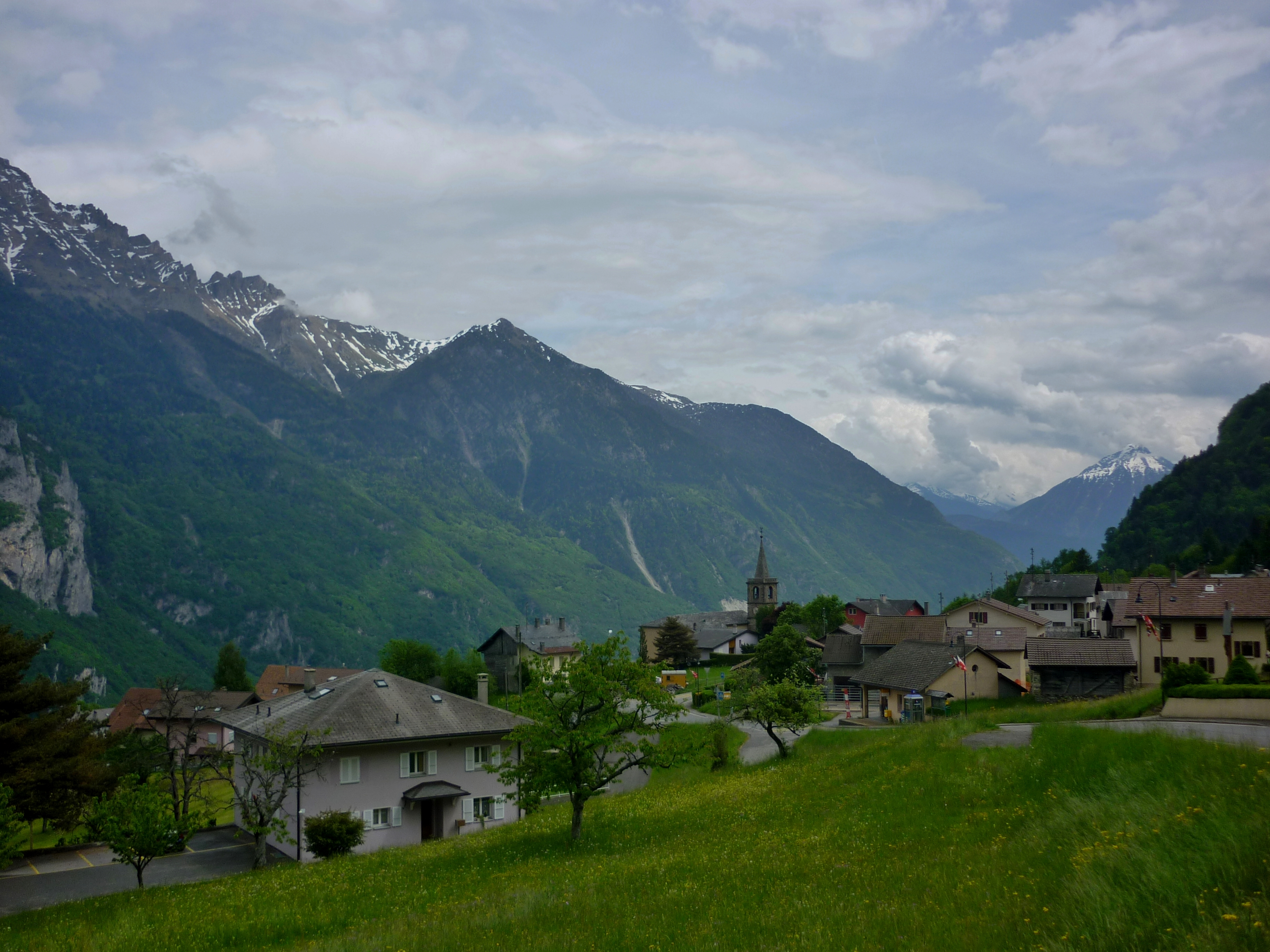

- Flag Coat of arms
- Location of Vérossaz
- Location within Switzerland Location within Canton of Valais
- Coordinates: 46°13′N 6°59′E
- Country: Switzerland
- Canton: Valais
- District: Saint-Maurice

Government
  - Mayor: Muriel Favre

Area
  - Total: 14.3 km^{2} (5.5 sq mi)
- Elevation: 811 m (2,661 ft)

Population (December 2002)
  - Total: 514
  - Density: 35.9/km^{2} (93.1/sq mi)
- Time zone: UTC+01:00 (CET)
  - Summer (DST): UTC+02:00 (CEST)
- Postal code: 1891
- SFOS number: 6220
- ISO 3166 code: CH-VS
- Surrounded by: Massongex, Mex, Monthey, Saint-Maurice, Troistorrents, Val-d'Illiez
- Website: www.verossaz.ch

Vérossaz is a municipality in the district of Saint-Maurice, in the canton of Valais, Switzerland.

== Geography ==
Vérossaz has an area, as of 2009, of 14.3 square kilometers (5.5 mi^{2}). Of this area, 3.57 km^{2} (1.38 mi^{2}) or 25.0% is used for agricultural purposes, while 6.79 km^{2} (2.62 mi^{2}) or 47.5% is forested. Of the rest of the land, 0.39 km^{2} (0.15 mi^{2}) or 2.7% is settled (buildings or roads), 0.07 km^{2} (17 acres) or 0.5% is either rivers or lakes and 3.5 km^{2} (1.4 mi^{2}) or 24.5% is unproductive land.

Of the built up area, housing and buildings made up 1.8% and transportation infrastructure made up 0.8%. Out of the forested land, 35.6% of the total land area is heavily forested and 3.0% is covered with orchards or small clusters of trees. Of the agricultural land, 0.1% is used for growing crops and 11.6% is pastures and 13.2% is used for alpine pastures. All the water in the municipality is flowing water. Of the unproductive areas, 7.3% is unproductive vegetation and 16.7% is too rocky for vegetation.

== Coat of arms ==
The blazon of the municipal coat of arms is Quartered Gules a Cross bottony Argent and Sable a Crown Or.

== Demographics ==
Vérossaz has a population (as of December 2020) of 774. As of 2008, 6.4% of the population are resident foreign nationals. Over the last 10 years (2000–2010 ) the population has changed at a rate of 18.8%. It has changed at a rate of 19.8% due to migration and at a rate of 7% due to births and deaths.

Most of the population (as of 2000) speaks French (430 or 97.9%) as their first language, German is the second most common (3 or 0.7%) and English is the third (2 or 0.5%). and 1 person who speaks Romansh.

As of 2008, the population was 49.5% male and 50.5% female. The population was made up of 261 Swiss men (45.3% of the population) and 24 (4.2%) non-Swiss men. There were 276 Swiss women (47.9%) and 15 (2.6%) non-Swiss women. Of the population in the municipality, 231 or about 52.6% were born in Vérossaz and lived there in 2000. There were 110 or 25.1% who were born in the same canton, while 62 or 14.1% were born somewhere else in Switzerland, and 32 or 7.3% were born outside of Switzerland.

As of 2000, children and teenagers (0–19 years old) make up 25.3% of the population, while adults (20–64 years old) make up 58.3% and seniors (over 64 years old) make up 16.4%.

As of 2000, there were 178 people who were single and never married in the municipality. There were 218 married individuals, 18 widows or widowers and 25 individuals who are divorced.

As of 2000, there were 174 private households in the municipality, and an average of 2.4 persons per household. There were 52 households that consist of only one person and 13 households with five or more people. In 2000, a total of 172 apartments (60.1% of the total) were permanently occupied, while 85 apartments (29.7%) were seasonally occupied and 29 apartments (10.1%) were empty. As of 2009, the construction rate of new housing units was 3.5 new units per 1000 residents. The vacancy rate for the municipality, in 2010, was 0.33%.

The historical population is given in the following chart:

== Politics ==
In the 2007 federal election the most popular party was the CVP which received 51.16% of the vote. The next three most popular parties were the SP (15.63%), the FDP (14.63%) and the SVP (11.53%). In the federal election, a total of 273 votes were cast, and the voter turnout was 65.3%.

In the 2009 Conseil d'État/Staatsrat election a total of 281 votes were cast, of which 8 or about 2.8% were invalid. The voter participation was 69.0%, which is much more than the cantonal average of 54.67%. In the 2007 Swiss Council of States election a total of 267 votes were cast, of which 20 or about 7.5% were invalid. The voter participation was 66.4%, which is much more than the cantonal average of 59.88%.

== Economy ==
As of 2010, Vérossaz had an unemployment rate of 3%. As of 2008, there were 26 people employed in the primary economic sector and about 14 businesses involved in this sector. 16 people were employed in the secondary sector and there were 3 businesses in this sector. 25 people were employed in the tertiary sector, with 10 businesses in this sector. There were 186 residents of the municipality who were employed in some capacity, of which females made up 38.7% of the workforce.

In 2008 the total number of full-time equivalent jobs was 52. The number of jobs in the primary sector was 15, all of which were in agriculture. The number of jobs in the secondary sector was 16 of which 1 was in manufacturing and 15 (93.8%) were in construction. The number of jobs in the tertiary sector was 21. In the tertiary sector; 4 or 19.0% were in wholesale or retail sales or the repair of motor vehicles, 6 or 28.6% were in the movement and storage of goods, 2 or 9.5% were in a hotel or restaurant, 2 or 9.5% were technical professionals or scientists, 5 or 23.8% were in education.

In 2000, there were 26 workers who commuted into the municipality and 138 workers who commuted away. The municipality is a net exporter of workers, with about 5.3 workers leaving the municipality for every one entering. Of the working population, 4.8% used public transportation to get to work, and 81.2% used a private car.

== Religion ==
From the 2000 census, 378 or 86.1% were Roman Catholic, while 29 or 6.6% belonged to the Swiss Reformed Church. Of the rest of the population, there was 1 individual who belongs to the Christian Catholic Church, and there were 5 individuals (or about 1.14% of the population) who belonged to another Christian church. There was 1 individual who was Islamic. There were 1 individual who belonged to another church. 18 (or about 4.10% of the population) belonged to no church, are agnostic or atheist, and 8 individuals (or about 1.82% of the population) did not answer the question.

== Education ==
In Vérossaz about 160 or (36.4%) of the population have completed non-mandatory upper secondary education, and 38 or (8.7%) have completed additional higher education (either university or a Fachhochschule). Of the 38 who completed tertiary schooling, 52.6% were Swiss men, 36.8% were Swiss women.

As of 2000, there was one student in Vérossaz who came from another municipality, while 30 residents attended schools outside the municipality.
