= Champoussin =

Village in Valais, Switzerland

Coordinates: 46°12′24″N 6°51′46″E

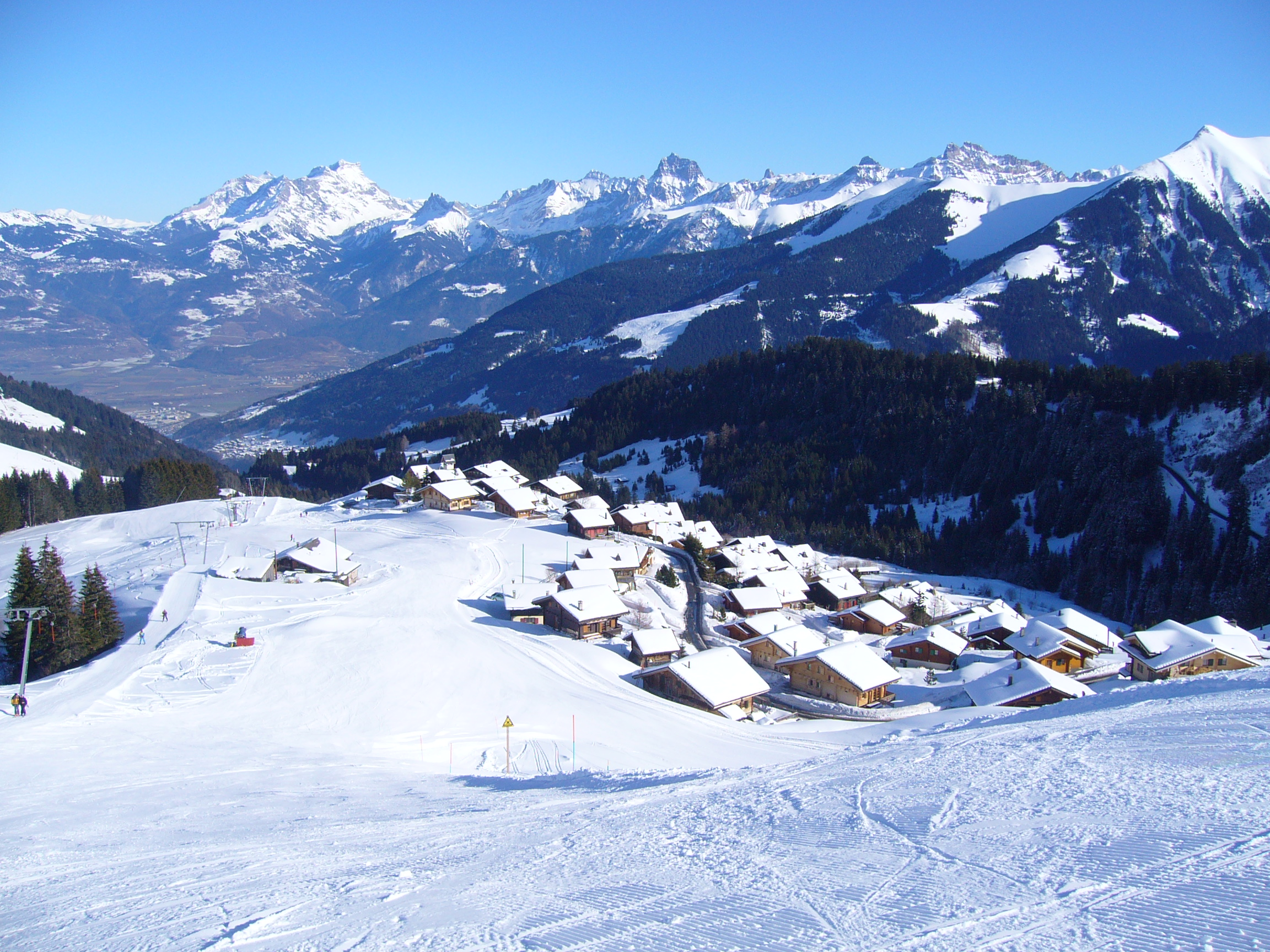
Champoussin in winter

Champoussin is a village in the Swiss Alps, located in the canton of Valais. The village is situated in the western part of the canton, near Champéry, in the municipality of Val-d'Illiez.

Champoussin lies at a height of 1,597 metres above sea level, on the eastern flanks of Pointe de l'Au. In winter it is part of the international ski area of Portes du Soleil.
