= Val d'Hérens =

Coordinates: 46°08′N 7°28′E

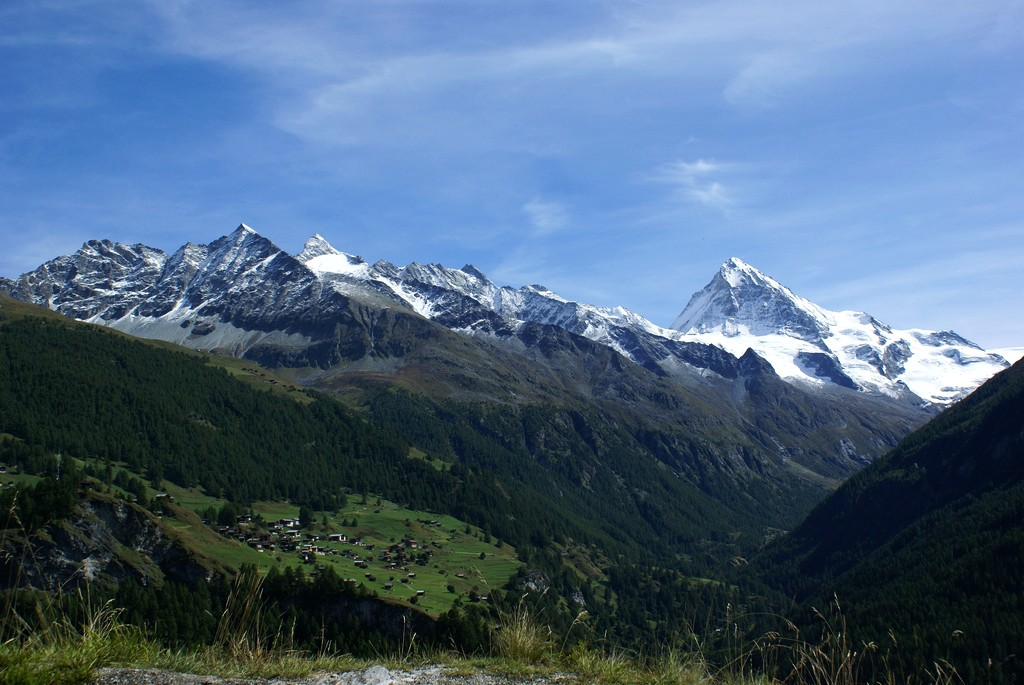
Val d'Hérens

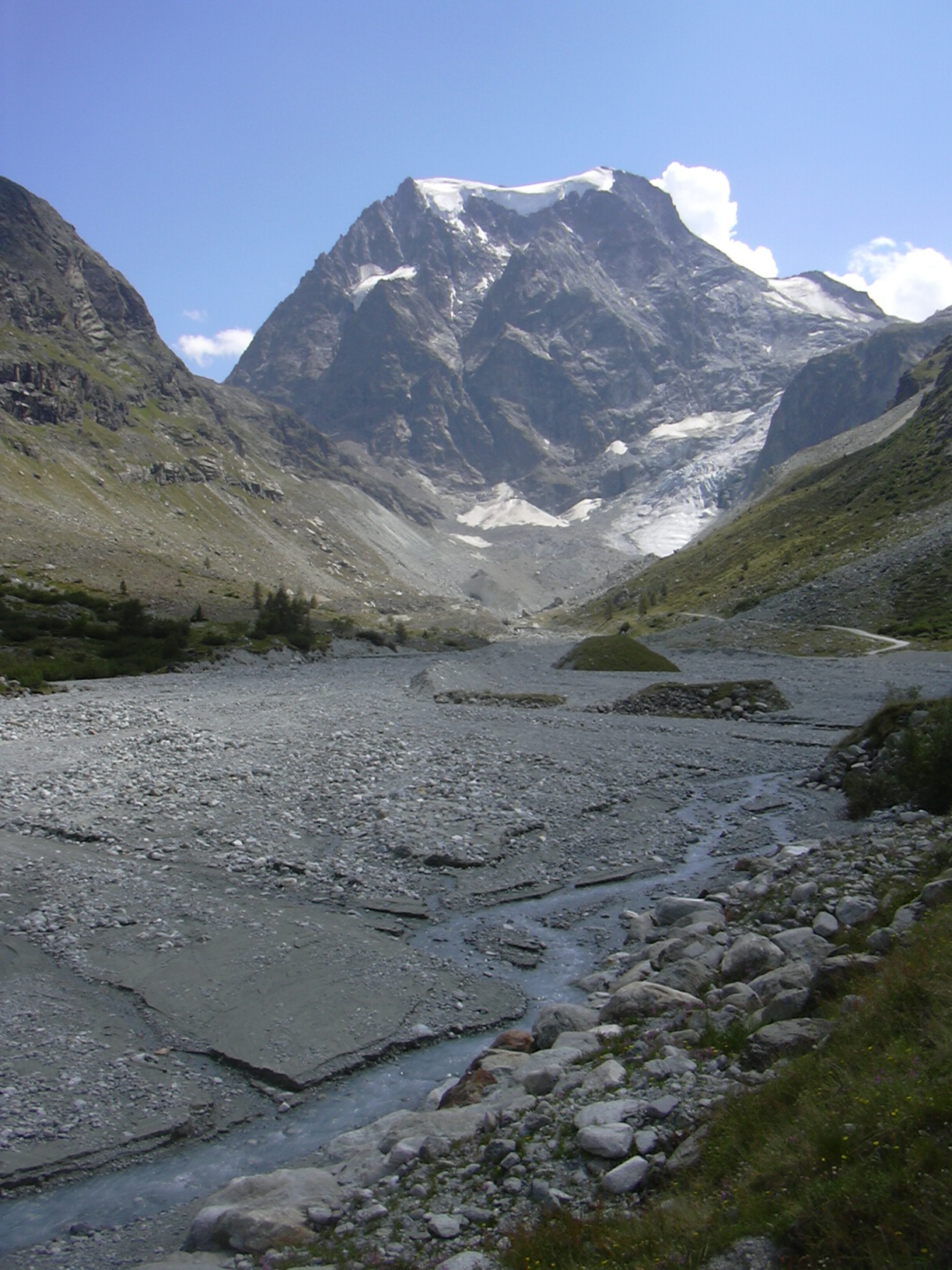
Borgne d'Arolla with Mont Collon

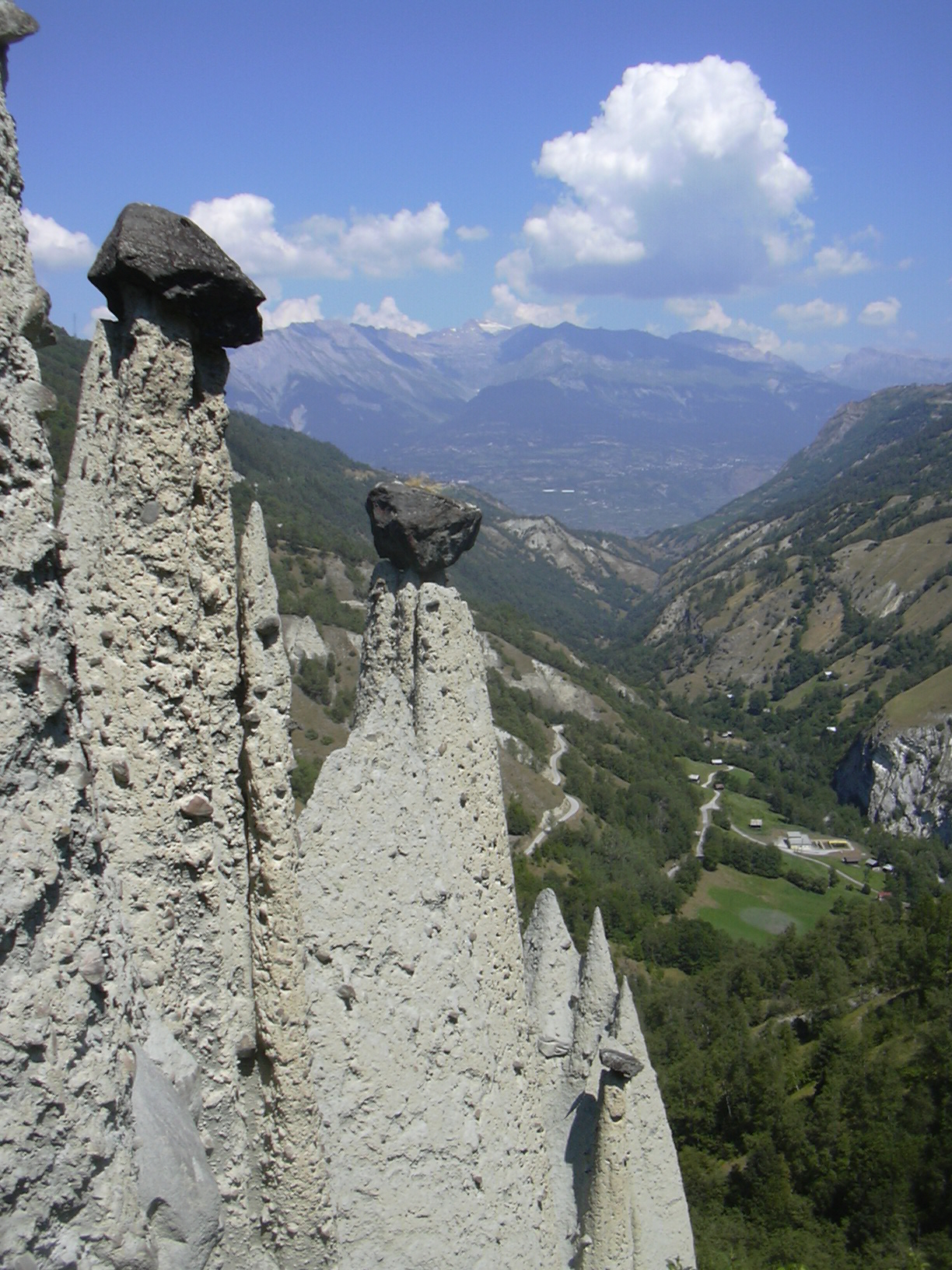
Pyramids of Euseigne

Val d'Hérens is an alpine valley in the Valais canton of Switzerland. It was formed by the Hérens glacier, which retreated at the end of the last ice age. It is now the valley of the Borgne river, a tributary of the Rhone (confluence above Sion).

It extends from the Rhône valley to a number of high mountains - Dent Blanche, Dent d'Hérens, Mont Collon, Mont Blanc de Cheilon. It is a popular start point for mountain expeditions. The area has two mountain peaks over 4,000 metres in altitude: la Dent Blanche ("white tooth") at 4,357 m, and la Dent d'Hérens ("Hérens tooth") at 4,171m. Other noteworthy peaks along the valley include: Grand Cornier, Mt Collon, Pigne d'Arolla, Vouasson, Rosablanche, and Mt Blanc de Cheillon.

The Herens breed of cattle is named after the valley.

The valley includes the following villages:

- Les Haudères
- Grande Dixence
- La Sage
- Evolène
- Euseigne
- Saint-Martin
- Hérémence
- Thyon Les Collons
- Mase
- Vernamiège
- Vex
- Nax

Above Les Haudères, the valley separates into the valley of the Borgne de Ferpècle to the east and the Borgne d'Arolla to the west.
