= Val d'Hérémence =

Valley in Valais, Switzerland

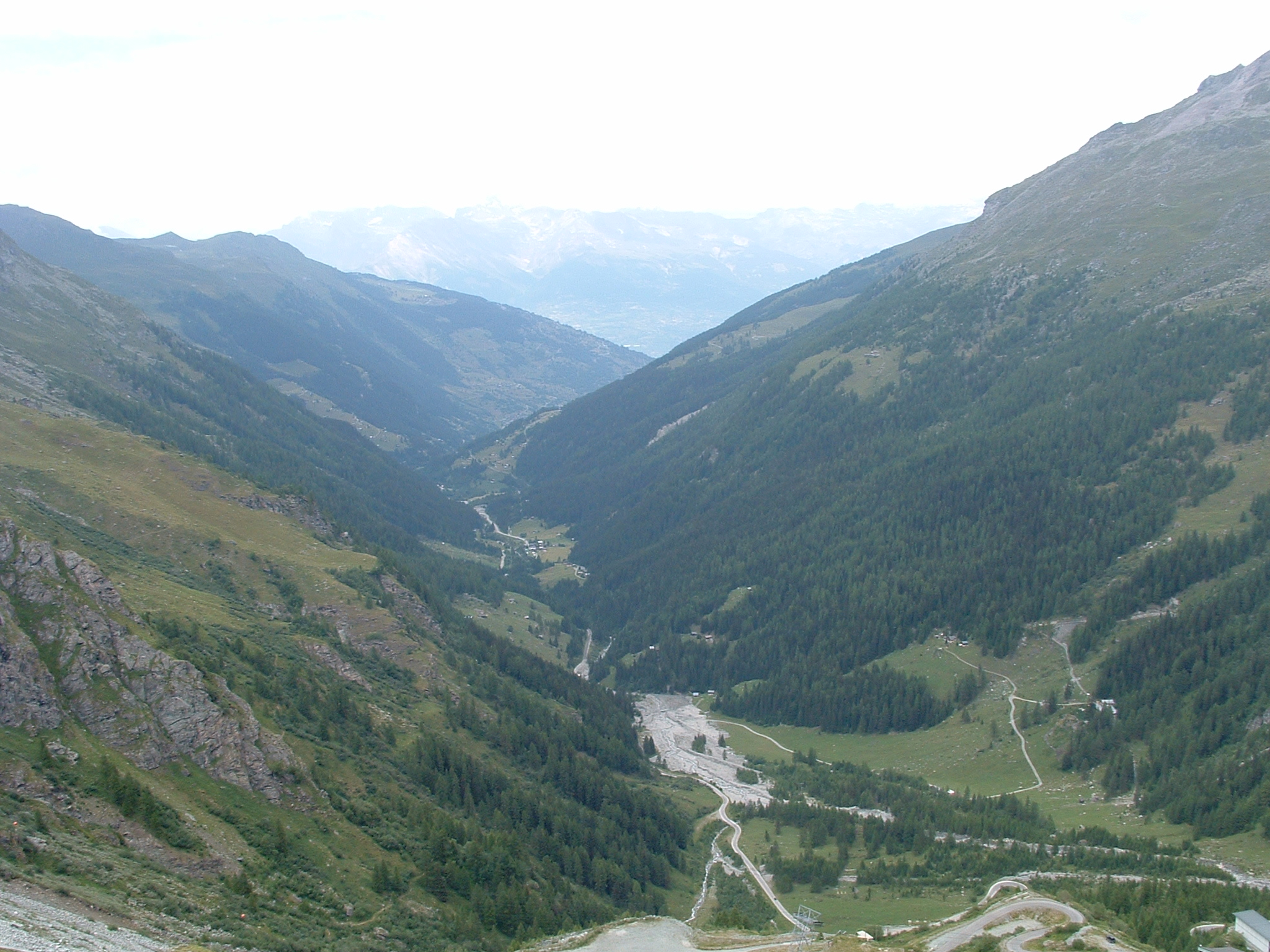
- View of the Val des Dix (upper part of the valley) and the Val d'Hérémence (lower part) from the Grande Dixence
- Length: 15 km (9.3 mi) North (downstream)

Geography
- Location: Switzerland
- Coordinates: 46°08′N 7°23′E
- Interactive map of Val d'Hérémence

The Val d'Hérémence is a valley located in Switzerland, within the Hérens District in the canton of Valais.

Traversed by the Dixence, it opens into the Val d'Hérens near Euseigne, south-southwest of Hérémence. The valley culminates at the Lac des Dix, an artificial reservoir created by the Grande Dixence Dam. The upper portion of the Val d'Hérémence is known as the Val des Dix.

Prior to the impoundment of the two successive dams (the 1930s structure was submerged by the newer reservoir), the valley extended to the base of Mont Blanc de Cheilon (3,870 m (12,697 ft)).

== Villages and hamlets ==
- Euseigne (979 m (3,212 ft))
- Hérémence (1,237 m (4,058 ft))
- Mâche (1,279 m (4,196 ft))
- Prolin (1,310 m (4,298 ft))
- Riod (1,440 m (4,724 ft))
- Pralong (1,608 m (5,276 ft))
- Le Chargeur (at the foot of the dam, 2,141 m (7,024 ft))

== See also ==
- Val d'Hérens
- Grande Dixence Dam
- Lac des Dix
- Pennine Alps
- Mont Blanc de Cheilon
