= Herens =

Herens or Hérens may refer to:

- Val d'Hérens, a valley in Switzerland
- Hérens (district), an administrative district covering the above valley
- Herens (cattle), a breed of cattle originating from the above valley

== See also ==
- Heren railway station, Taiwan
