= Mase, Switzerland =

Mase
- Former municipality
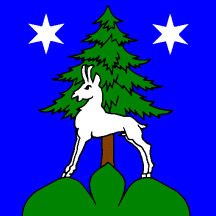
- Flag
- Location of Mase
- Location within Switzerland Location within Canton of Valais
- Coordinates: 46°12′N 7°26′E
- Country: Switzerland
- Canton: Valais
- District: Hérens

Area
  - Total: 11.1 km^{2} (4.3 sq mi)
- Elevation: 1,301 m (4,268 ft)

Population (December 2002)
  - Total: 215
  - Density: 19.4/km^{2} (50.2/sq mi)
- Time zone: UTC+01:00 (CET)
  - Summer (DST): UTC+02:00 (CEST)
- Postal code: 1968
- SFOS number: 6085
- ISO 3166 code: CH-VS
- Surrounded by: Nax, Saint-Martin, Vernamiège, Vex
- Website: www.mase.ch

Mase (French pronunciation: [maz]) is a former municipality in the district of Hérens in the canton of Valais in Switzerland. On 1 January 2011, the former municipalities of Vernamiège, Nax and Mase merged in the new municipality of Mont-Noble.

== History ==
Mase is first mentioned about 1100 as villa Magis. Until 1902 it was known as Mage.

== Geography ==
Mase has an area, as of 2009, of 11.1 square kilometers (4.3 mi^{2}). Of this area, 4.04 km^{2} (1.56 mi^{2}) or 36.4% is used for agricultural purposes, while 5.06 km^{2} (1.95 mi^{2}) or 45.6% is forested. Of the rest of the land, 0.41 km^{2} (0.16 mi^{2}) or 3.7% is settled (buildings or roads), 0.03 km^{2} (7.4 acres) or 0.3% is either rivers or lakes and 1.54 km^{2} (0.59 mi^{2}) or 13.9% is unproductive land.

Of the built up area, housing and buildings made up 2.0% and transportation infrastructure made up 1.7%. Out of the forested land, 40.8% of the total land area is heavily forested and 4.4% is covered with orchards or small clusters of trees. Of the agricultural land, 0.1% is used for growing crops and 6.9% is pastures and 29.4% is used for alpine pastures. All the water in the village is flowing water. Of the unproductive areas, 7.5% is unproductive vegetation and 6.4% is too rocky for vegetation.

The village is located in the Hérens district on the right bank of the Borgne and the left bank of the Rhone in the Val d'Hérens at an elevation of 1,345 m (4,413 ft). It consists of the village of Mase.

Aerial view (1955)

Aerial view (1955)

== Coat of arms ==
The blazon of the village coat of arms is Azure, issuant from Coupeaux Vert a Pine Tree Vert trunked proper and a Chamois statant Argent, in chief two Mullets of the last.

== Demographics ==
Mase has a population (as of December 2002) of 215.

Most of the population (as of 2000) speaks French (187 or 90.3%) as their first language, German is the second most common (13 or 6.3%) and Italian is the third (3 or 1.4%).

As of 2008, the gender distribution of the population was 47.7% male and 52.3% female. The population was made up of 108 Swiss men (46.0% of the population) and 4 (1.7%) non-Swiss men. There were 114 Swiss women (48.5%) and 9 (3.8%) non-Swiss women. Of the population in the village 120 or about 58.0% were born in Mase and lived there in 2000. There were 37 or 17.9% who were born in the same canton, while 24 or 11.6% were born somewhere else in Switzerland, and 16 or 7.7% were born outside of Switzerland.

As of 2000, there were 73 people who were single and never married in the village. There were 107 married individuals, 20 widows or widowers and 7 individuals who are divorced.

There were 34 households that consist of only one person and 4 households with five or more people. Out of a total of 99 households that answered this question, 34.3% were households made up of just one person and there were 3 adults who lived with their parents. Of the rest of the households, there are 30 married couples without children, 23 married couples with children There were 3 single parents with a child or children. There were 5 households that were made up of unrelated people and 1 household that was made up of some sort of institution or another collective housing.

In 2000 there were 219 single family homes (or 81.7% of the total) out of a total of 268 inhabited buildings. There were 33 multi-family buildings (12.3%), along with 6 multi-purpose buildings that were mostly used for housing (2.2%) and 10 other use buildings (commercial or industrial) that also had some housing (3.7%).

In 2000, a total of 92 apartments (28.7% of the total) were permanently occupied, while 209 apartments (65.1%) were seasonally occupied and 20 apartments (6.2%) were empty.

The historical population is given in the following chart:

== Sights ==
The entire village of Mase is designated as part of the Inventory of Swiss Heritage Sites.

== Politics ==
In the 2007 federal election the most popular party was the CVP which received 41.05% of the vote. The next three most popular parties were the SP (21.53%), the SVP (16.98%) and the FDP (13.35%). In the federal election, a total of 162 votes were cast, and the voter turnout was 78.6%.

In the 2009 Conseil d'État/Staatsrat election a total of 124 votes were cast, of which 8 or about 6.5% were invalid. The voter participation was 67.0%, which is much more than the cantonal average of 54.67%. In the 2007 Swiss Council of States election a total of 156 votes were cast, of which 4 or about 2.6% were invalid. The voter participation was 81.3%, which is much more than the cantonal average of 59.88%.

== Economy ==
There were 83 residents of the village who were employed in some capacity, of which females made up 39.8% of the workforce.

In 2008 the total number of full-time equivalent jobs was 36. The number of jobs in the primary sector was 4, all of which were in agriculture. The number of jobs in the secondary sector was 14, all of which were in construction. The number of jobs in the tertiary sector was 18 of which 13 or 72.2% were in a hotel or restaurant.

In 2000, there were 7 workers who commuted into the village and 61 workers who commuted away. The village is a net exporter of workers, with about 8.7 workers leaving the village for every one entering.

== Religion ==
From the 2000 census, 175 or 84.5% were Roman Catholic, while 8 or 3.9% belonged to the Swiss Reformed Church. There were 5 (or about 2.42% of the population) who were Islamic. 11 (or about 5.31% of the population) belonged to no church, are agnostic or atheist, and 8 individuals (or about 3.86% of the population) did not answer the question.

== Education ==
In Mase about 66 or (31.9%) of the population have completed non-mandatory upper secondary education, and 10 or (4.8%) have completed additional higher education (either University or a Fachhochschule). Of the 10 who completed tertiary schooling, 90.0% were Swiss men, 10.0% were Swiss women.

As of 2000, there were 25 students from Mase who attended schools outside the village.
