= Mont-Noble =

- Municipality
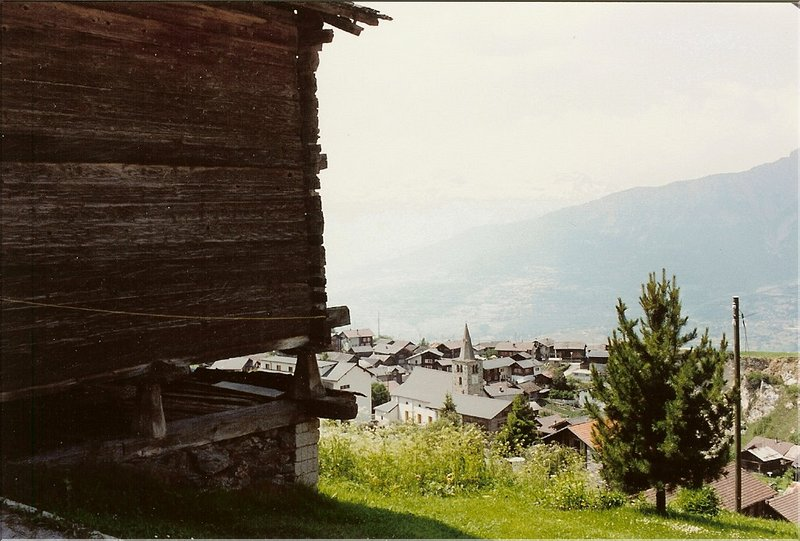
- Nax village

- Flag Coat of arms
- Location of Mont-Noble
- Location within Switzerland Location within Canton of Valais
- Coordinates: 46°13′N 07°25′E
- Country: Switzerland
- Canton: Valais
- District: Hérens

Area
  - Total: 43.0 km^{2} (16.6 sq mi)
- Elevation: 1,286 m (4,219 ft)

Population (December 2020)
  - Total: 1,102
  - Density: 25.6/km^{2} (66.4/sq mi)
- Time zone: UTC+01:00 (CET)
  - Summer (DST): UTC+02:00 (CEST)
- Postal code: 1973
- SFOS number: 6090
- ISO 3166 code: CH-VS
- Website: https://www.mont-noble.ch SFSO statistics

Mont-Noble (French pronunciation: [mɔ̃ nɔbl]) is a municipality in the district of Hérens in the canton of Valais in Switzerland. It was created on 1 January 2011 through the merger of the municipalities of Mase, Vernamiège and Nax.

== History ==
Mase is first mentioned about 1100 as villa Magis. Until 1902 it was known as Mage. Nax is first mentioned around 1001-1100 as Nas. Nax's village church collapsed in 1909 during a service, killing 31 and injuring 50.

== Geography ==
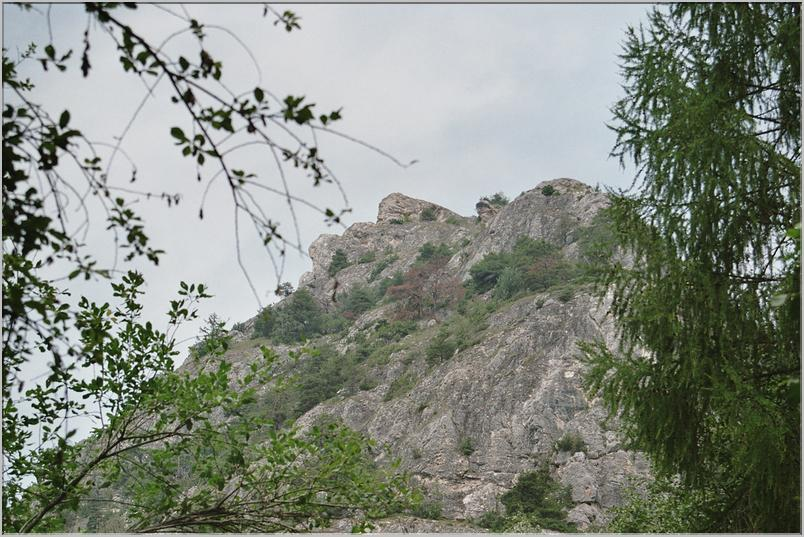
Rocky promontory near Nax

Mont-Noble has an area, as of 2013, of 43.45 square kilometers (16.78 mi^{2}). Of this area, 30.7% is used for agricultural purposes, while 41.7% is forested. Of the rest of the land, 4.1% is settled (buildings or roads) and 23.4% is unproductive land.

The village of Mase is located in the Hérens district on the right bank of the Borgne and the left bank of the Rhone in the Val d'Hérens at an elevation of 1,345 m (4,413 ft).

Nax is situated at the entrance to the Hérens valley near a rocky promontory which may provided its name, from the Latin: nasus, nose.

== Demographics ==
Mont-Noble has a population (as of December 2020) of 1,102. As of 2008, 7.2% of the population are resident foreign nationals. Over the last 10 years (1999–2009 ) the population has changed at a rate of 10.6%. It has changed at a rate of 15.5% due to migration and at a rate of -6.2% due to births and deaths.

Most of the population (as of 2000) speaks French (92.8%) as their first language, German is the second most common (5.2%) and Italian is the third (0.8%).

The age distribution of the population (as of 2000) is children and teenagers (0–19 years old) make up 17.3% of the population, while adults (20–64 years old) make up 57.6% and seniors (over 64 years old) make up 25.1%.

As of 2009, the construction rate of new housing units was 6.8 new units per 1000 residents. The vacancy rate for the municipality, in 2010, was 1.49%.

== Historic Population ==
The historical population is given in the following chart:

== Sights ==
The entire village of Mase is designated as part of the Inventory of Swiss Heritage Sites.

== Economy ==
As of 2010, Mont-Noble had an unemployment rate of 5.7%. As of 2008, there were 27 people employed in the primary economic sector and about 16 businesses involved in this sector. 26 people were employed in the secondary sector and there were 8 businesses in this sector. 93 people were employed in the tertiary sector, with 31 businesses in this sector.

Of the working population, 11.8% used public transportation to get to work, and 67.1% used a private car.

== Notable people ==
- Bertrand Bitz (b. 1978), singer and songwriter from Nax
