= Saint-Nicolas Church, Hérémence =

Catholic church in Hérémence, Switzerland

Coordinates: 46.1805°N 7.4045°E

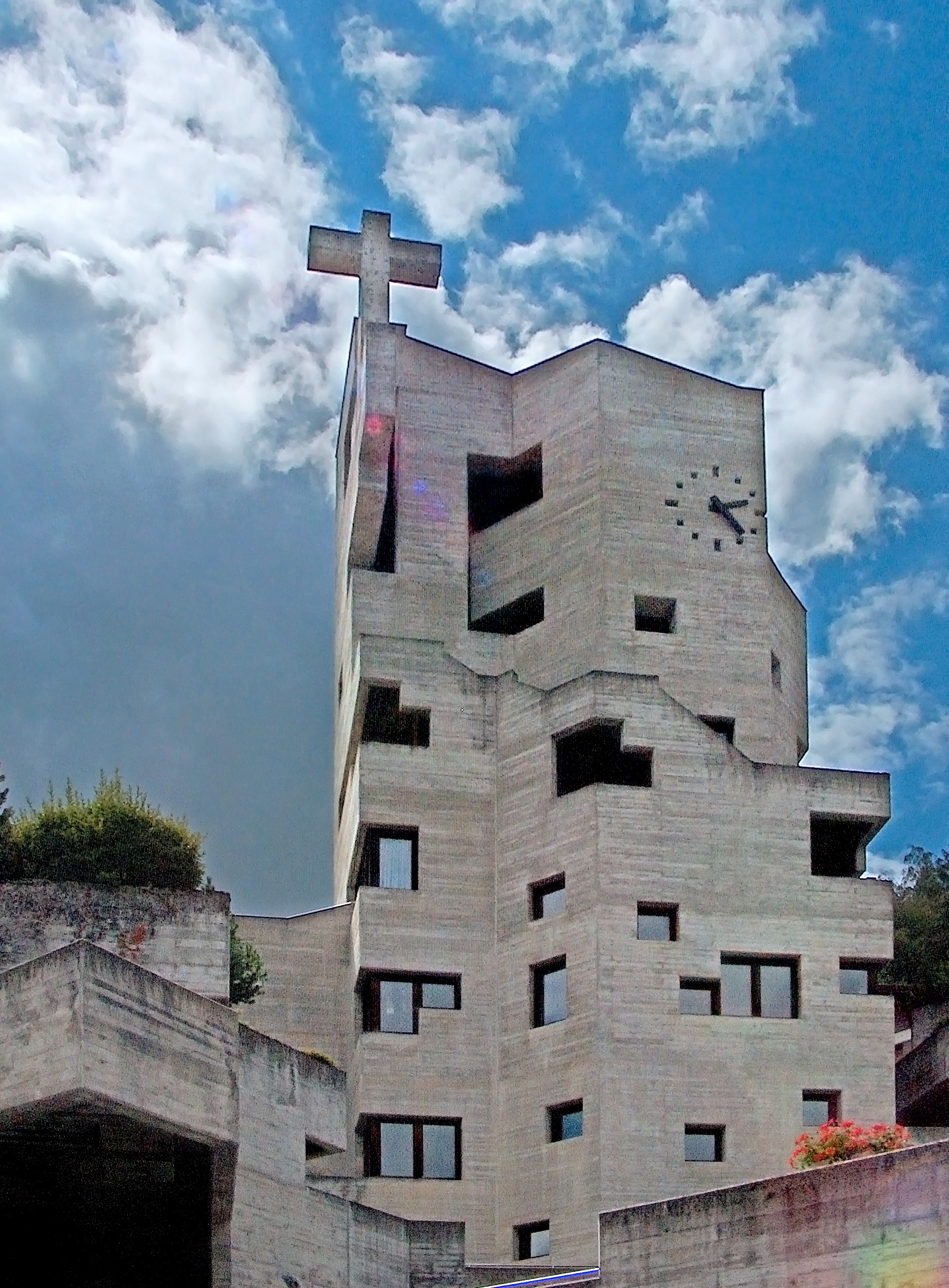

Saint-Nicolas Church is a Catholic church in Hérémence, Switzerland, known for its brutalist modern architecture. It was designed by Walter Maria Förderer (March 21, 1928–June 29, 2006).
