= Nax =

- Former municipality
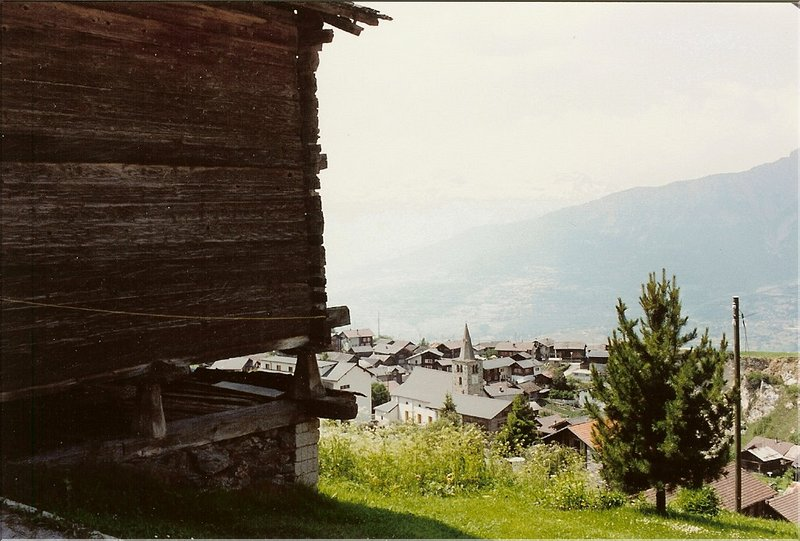
- Nax village

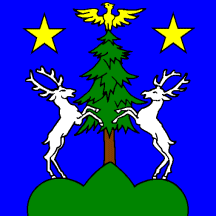
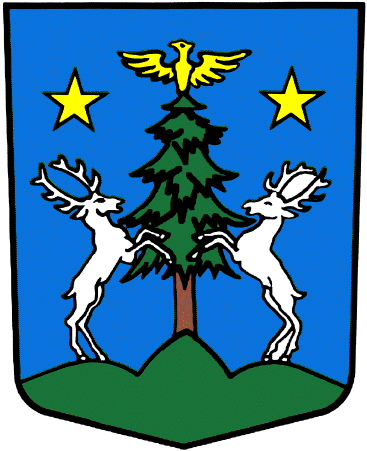
- Flag Coat of arms
- Location of Nax
- Location within Switzerland Location within Canton of Valais
- Coordinates: 46°14′N 7°26′E
- Country: Switzerland
- Canton: Valais
- District: Hérens

Area
  - Total: 24.5 km^{2} (9.5 sq mi)
- Elevation: 1,286 m (4,219 ft)

Population (December 2002)
  - Total: 403
  - Density: 16.4/km^{2} (42.6/sq mi)
- Time zone: UTC+01:00 (CET)
  - Summer (DST): UTC+02:00 (CEST)
- Postal code: 1973
- SFOS number: 6086
- ISO 3166 code: CH-VS
- Surrounded by: Grimentz, Grône, Mase, Saint-Jean, Saint-Martin, Sion, Vernamiège, Vex
- Website: www.nax.ch

Nax is a former municipality in the district of Hérens in the canton of Valais in Switzerland. On 1 January 2011, the former municipalities of Vernamiège, Nax and Mase merged in the new municipality of Mont-Noble.

== History ==
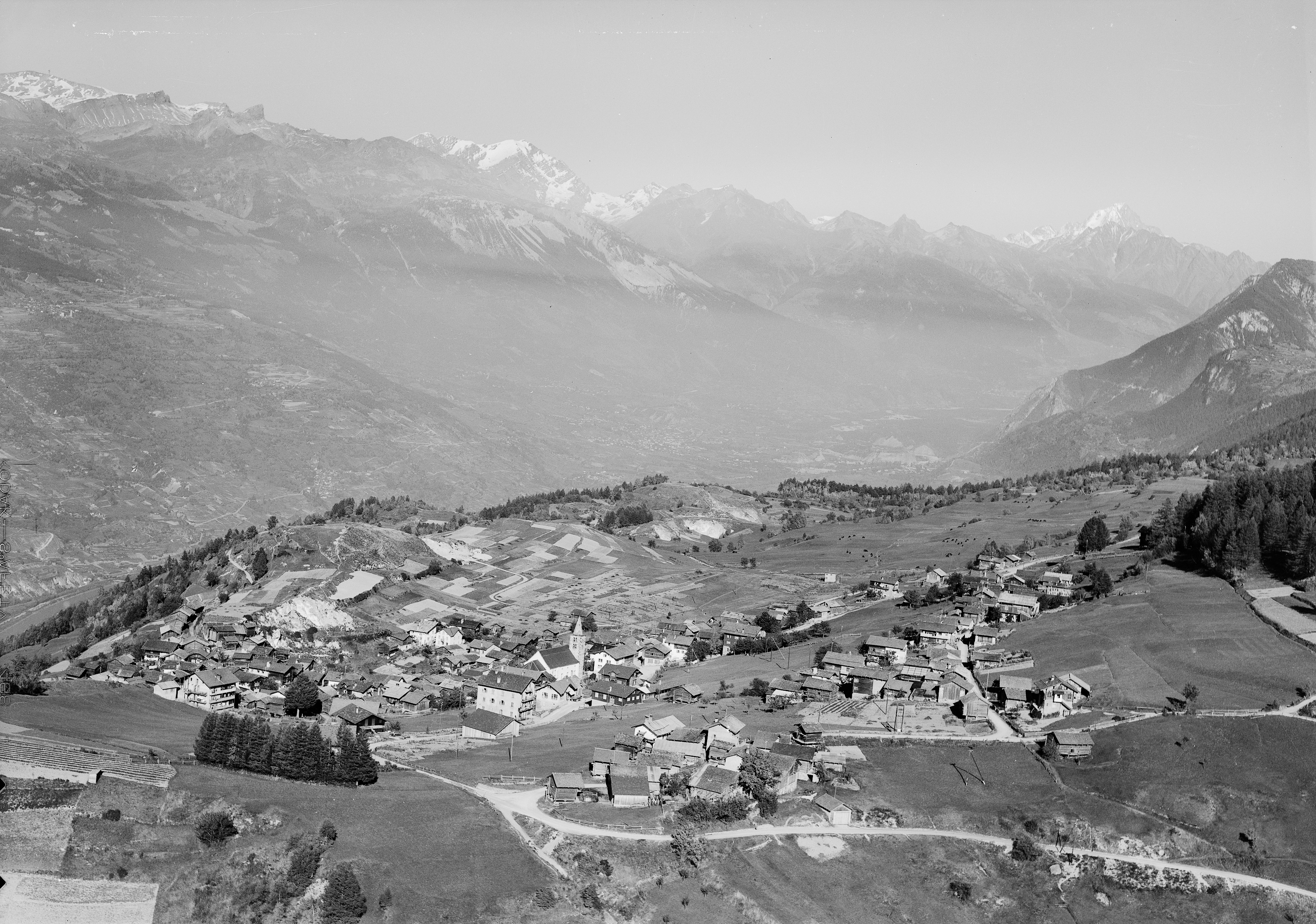
Aerial view (1955)

Nax is first mentioned around 1001–1100 as Nas. Its village church collapsed in 1909 during a service, killing 31 and injuring 50.

== Geography ==
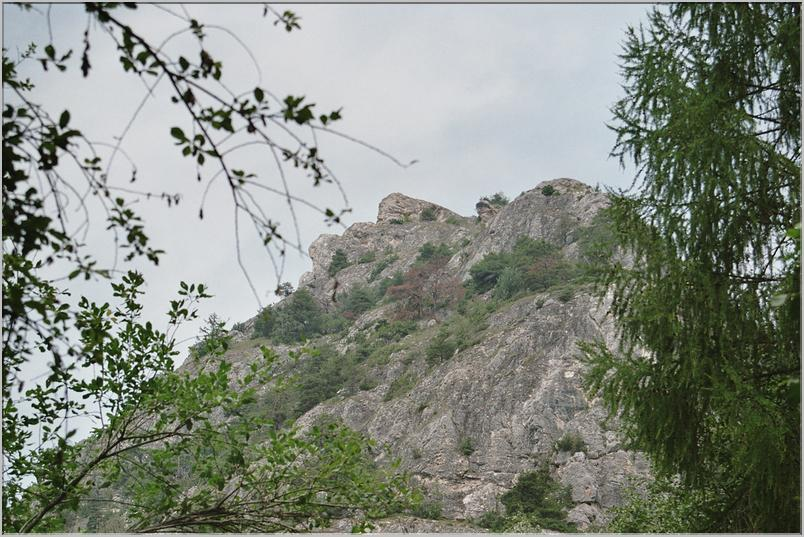
Rocky promontory near Nax

Nax has an area, as of 2009, of 24.5 square kilometers (9.5 mi^{2}). Of this area, 8.13 km^{2} (3.14 mi^{2}) or 33.1% is used for agricultural purposes, while 7.77 km^{2} (3.00 mi^{2}) or 31.7% is forested. Of the rest of the land, 0.78 km^{2} (0.30 mi^{2}) or 3.2% is settled (buildings or roads), 0.11 km^{2} (27 acres) or 0.4% is either rivers or lakes and 7.71 km^{2} (2.98 mi^{2}) or 31.4% is unproductive land.

Of the built up area, housing and buildings made up 1.8% and transportation infrastructure made up 0.9%. Out of the forested land, 29.2% of the total land area is heavily forested and 2.5% is covered with orchards or small clusters of trees. Of the agricultural land, 0.1% is used for growing crops and 5.4% is pastures and 27.1% is used for alpine pastures. Of the water in the village, 0.2% is in lakes and 0.2% is in rivers and streams. Of the unproductive areas, 12.4% is unproductive vegetation and 19.0% is too rocky for vegetation.

Nax is situated at the entrance to the Hérens valley near a rocky promontory which may provided its name, from the Latin: nasus, nose.

== Coat of arms ==
The blazon of the village coat of arms is Azure, issuant from Coupeaux Vert between two Bucks rampant respectant Argent a Pine Tree Vert trunked proper topped with a Bird volant Or, in chief two Mullets of Five of the last.

== Demographics ==
Nax has a population (as of December 2002) of 403.

Most of the population (as of 2000) speaks French (362 or 94.5%) as their first language, German is the second most common (14 or 3.7%) and Italian is the third (3 or 0.8%).

As of 2008, the gender distribution of the population was 45.6% male and 54.4% female. The population was made up of 181 Swiss men (40.0% of the population) and 25 (5.5%) non-Swiss men. There were 231 Swiss women (51.1%) and 15 (3.3%) non-Swiss women. Of the population in the village 212 or about 55.4% were born in Nax and lived there in 2000. There were 66 or 17.2% who were born in the same canton, while 57 or 14.9% were born somewhere else in Switzerland, and 33 or 8.6% were born outside of Switzerland.

As of 2000, there were 135 people who were single and never married in the village. There were 193 married individuals, 37 widows or widowers and 18 individuals who are divorced.

There were 55 households that consist of only one person and 7 households with five or more people. Out of a total of 174 households that answered this question, 31.6% were households made up of just one person and there were 7 adults who lived with their parents. Of the rest of the households, there are 50 married couples without children, 45 married couples with children There were 9 single parents with a child or children. There were 2 households that were made up of unrelated people and 6 households that were made up of some sort of institution or another collective housing.

In 2000 there were 291 single family homes (or 71.9% of the total) out of a total of 405 inhabited buildings. There were 75 multi-family buildings (18.5%), along with 28 multi-purpose buildings that were mostly used for housing (6.9%) and 11 other use buildings (commercial or industrial) that also had some housing (2.7%).

In 2000, a total of 167 apartments (28.9% of the total) were permanently occupied, while 359 apartments (62.2%) were seasonally occupied and 51 apartments (8.8%) were empty.

The historical population is given in the following chart:

== Politics ==
In the 2007 federal election the most popular party was the CVP which received 35.92% of the vote. The next three most popular parties were the SP (25.32%), the FDP (16.05%) and the SVP (13.99%). In the federal election, a total of 248 votes were cast, and the voter turnout was 67.2%.

In the 2009 Conseil d'État/Staatsrat election a total of 227 votes were cast, of which 8 or about 3.5% were invalid. The voter participation was 63.6%, which is much more than the cantonal average of 54.67%. In the 2007 Swiss Council of States election a total of 244 votes were cast, of which 14 or about 5.7% were invalid. The voter participation was 68.5%, which is much more than the cantonal average of 59.88%.

== Economy ==
As of 2010, Nax had an unemployment rate of 0%. As of 2008, there were people employed in the primary economic sector and about businesses involved in this sector. No one was employed in the secondary sector or the tertiary sector. There were 169 residents of the village who were employed in some capacity, of which females made up 43.2% of the workforce.

In 2008 the total number of full-time equivalent jobs was 65. The number of jobs in the primary sector was 7, all of which were in agriculture. The number of jobs in the secondary sector was 9 of which 4 or (44.4%) were in manufacturing and 4 (44.4%) were in construction. The number of jobs in the tertiary sector was 49. In the tertiary sector; 11 or 22.4% were in the sale or repair of motor vehicles, 4 or 8.2% were in the movement and storage of goods, 10 or 20.4% were in a hotel or restaurant, 14 or 28.6% were technical professionals or scientists, 3 or 6.1% were in education.

In 2000, there were 29 workers who commuted into the village and 103 workers who commuted away. The village is a net exporter of workers, with about 3.6 workers leaving the village for every one entering. Of the working population, % used public transportation to get to work, and % used a private car.

== Religion ==
From the 2000 census, 330 or 86.2% were Roman Catholic, while 17 or 4.4% belonged to the Swiss Reformed Church. There were 1 individual who belonged to another church. 20 (or about 5.22% of the population) belonged to no church, are agnostic or atheist, and 15 individuals (or about 3.92% of the population) did not answer the question.

== Education ==
In Nax about 134 or (35.0%) of the population have completed non-mandatory upper secondary education, and 40 or (10.4%) have completed additional higher education (either University or a Fachhochschule). Of the 40 who completed tertiary schooling, 50.0% were Swiss men, 25.0% were Swiss women, 12.5% were non-Swiss men and 12.5% were non-Swiss women.

As of 2000, there were 14 students in Nax who came from another village, while 25 residents attended schools outside the village.
