= Vernamiège =

- Former municipality
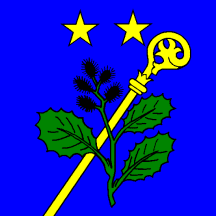
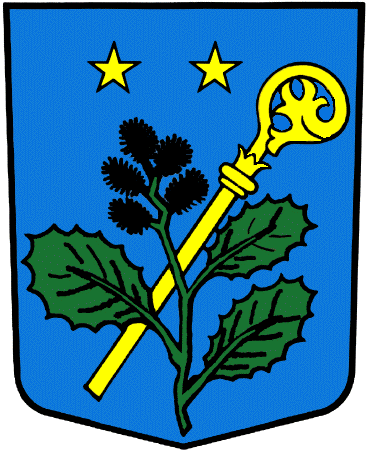
- Flag Coat of arms
- Location of Vernamiège
- Location within Switzerland Location within Canton of Valais
- Coordinates: 46°13′N 7°26′E
- Country: Switzerland
- Canton: Valais
- District: Hérens

Area
  - Total: 7.4 km^{2} (2.9 sq mi)
- Elevation: 1,321 m (4,334 ft)

Population (December 2002)
  - Total: 153
  - Density: 21/km^{2} (54/sq mi)
- Time zone: UTC+01:00 (CET)
  - Summer (DST): UTC+02:00 (CEST)
- Postal code: 1961
- SFOS number: 6088
- ISO 3166 code: CH-VS
- Surrounded by: Mase, Nax, Sion, Vex
- Website: www.vernamiege.ch

Vernamiège (French pronunciation: [vɛʁnamjɛʒ]) is a former municipality in the district of Hérens in the canton of Valais in Switzerland. On 1 January 2011, the former municipalities of Vernamiège, Nax and Mase merged in the new municipality of Mont-Noble.

== Geography ==
Aerial view (1955)

Vernamiège has an area, as of 2009, of 7.4 square kilometers (2.9 mi^{2}). Of this area, 1.51 km^{2} (0.58 mi^{2}) or 20.4% is used for agricultural purposes, while 5.28 km^{2} (2.04 mi^{2}) or 71.4% is forested. Of the rest of the land, 0.3 km^{2} (0.12 mi^{2}) or 4.1% is settled (buildings or roads), 0.02 km^{2} (4.9 acres) or 0.3% is either rivers or lakes and 0.28 km^{2} (0.11 mi^{2}) or 3.8% is unproductive land.

Of the built up area, housing and buildings made up 1.6% and transportation infrastructure made up 2.3%. Out of the forested land, 65.9% of the total land area is heavily forested and 5.5% is covered with orchards or small clusters of trees. Of the agricultural land, 0.0% is used for growing crops and 8.7% is pastures, while 1.2% is used for orchards or vine crops and 10.6% is used for alpine pastures. All the water in the village is flowing water. Of the unproductive areas, 1.5% is unproductive vegetation and 2.3% is too rocky for vegetation.

== Coat of arms ==
The blazon of the village coat of arms is Azure a Crosier Or issuant from base and an alder-tree Branch Vert fructed Sable in saltire in chief two Mullets of Five of the second.

== Demographics ==
Vernamiège has a population (as of December 2002) of 153.

Most of the population (as of 2000) speaks French (132 or 91.7%) as their first language, German is the second most common (11 or 7.6%) and Dutch is the third (1 or 0.7%).

As of 2008, the gender distribution of the population was 47.1% male and 52.9% female. The population was made up of 83 Swiss men (43.9% of the population) and 6 (3.2%) non-Swiss men. There were 96 Swiss women (50.8%) and 4 (2.1%) non-Swiss women. Of the population in the village 97 or about 67.4% were born in Vernamiège and lived there in 2000. There were 15 or 10.4% who were born in the same canton, while 24 or 16.7% were born somewhere else in Switzerland, and 8 or 5.6% were born outside of Switzerland.

As of 2000, there were 60 people who were single and never married in the village. There were 70 married individuals, 10 widows or widowers and 4 individuals who are divorced.

There were 25 households that consist of only one person and 4 households with five or more people. Out of a total of 68 households that answered this question, 36.8% were households made up of just one person and there were 3 adults who lived with their parents. Of the rest of the households, there are 21 married couples without children, 14 married couples with children There were 2 single parents with a child or children. There were 3 households that were made up of unrelated people.

In 2000 there were 119 single family homes (or 73.0% of the total) out of a total of 163 inhabited buildings. There were 36 multi-family buildings (22.1%), along with 5 multi-purpose buildings that were mostly used for housing (3.1%) and 3 other use buildings (commercial or industrial) that also had some housing (1.8%).

In 2000, a total of 68 apartments (31.1% of the total) were permanently occupied, while 127 apartments (58.0%) were seasonally occupied and 24 apartments (11.0%) were empty.

The historical population is given in the following chart:

== Politics ==
In the 2007 federal election the most popular party was the CVP which received 48.48% of the vote. The next three most popular parties were the SP (23.38%), the Green Party (11.4%) and the SVP (11.11%). In the federal election, a total of 100 votes were cast, and the voter turnout was 63.3%.

In the 2009 Conseil d'État/Staatsrat election a total of 84 votes were cast, of which 7 or about 8.3% were invalid. The voter participation was 51.9%, which is similar to the cantonal average of 54.67%. In the 2007 Swiss Council of States election a total of 99 votes were cast, of which 3 or about 3.0% were invalid. The voter participation was 63.5%, which is similar to the cantonal average of 59.88%.

== Economy ==
As of 2010, Vernamiège had an unemployment rate of 0%. As of 2008, there were people employed in the primary economic sector and about businesses involved in this sector. No one was employed in the secondary sector or the tertiary sector. There were 52 residents of the village who were employed in some capacity, of which females made up 38.5% of the workforce.

In 2008 the total number of full-time equivalent jobs was 11. The number of jobs in the primary sector was 4, all of which were in agriculture. There were no jobs in the secondary sector. The number of jobs in the tertiary sector was 7. In the tertiary sector; 1 was in the sale or repair of motor vehicles, 1 was in a hotel or restaurant, and 1 was in the information industry.

In 2000, there were 34 workers who commuted away from the village. Of the working population, % used public transportation to get to work, and % used a private car.

== Religion ==
From the 2000 census, 118 or 81.9% were Roman Catholic, while 12 or 8.3% belonged to the Swiss Reformed Church. There was 1 individual who was Jewish, and 10 (or about 6.94% of the population) belonged to no church, are agnostic or atheist, and 3 individuals (or about 2.08% of the population) did not answer the question.

== Education ==
In Vernamiège about 34 or (23.6%) of the population have completed non-mandatory upper secondary education, and 20 or (13.9%) have completed additional higher education (either University or a Fachhochschule). Of the 20 who completed tertiary schooling, 65.0% were Swiss men, 30.0% were Swiss women.

As of 2000, there were 17 students from Vernamiège who attended schools outside the village.
