= Evolène =

- Municipality
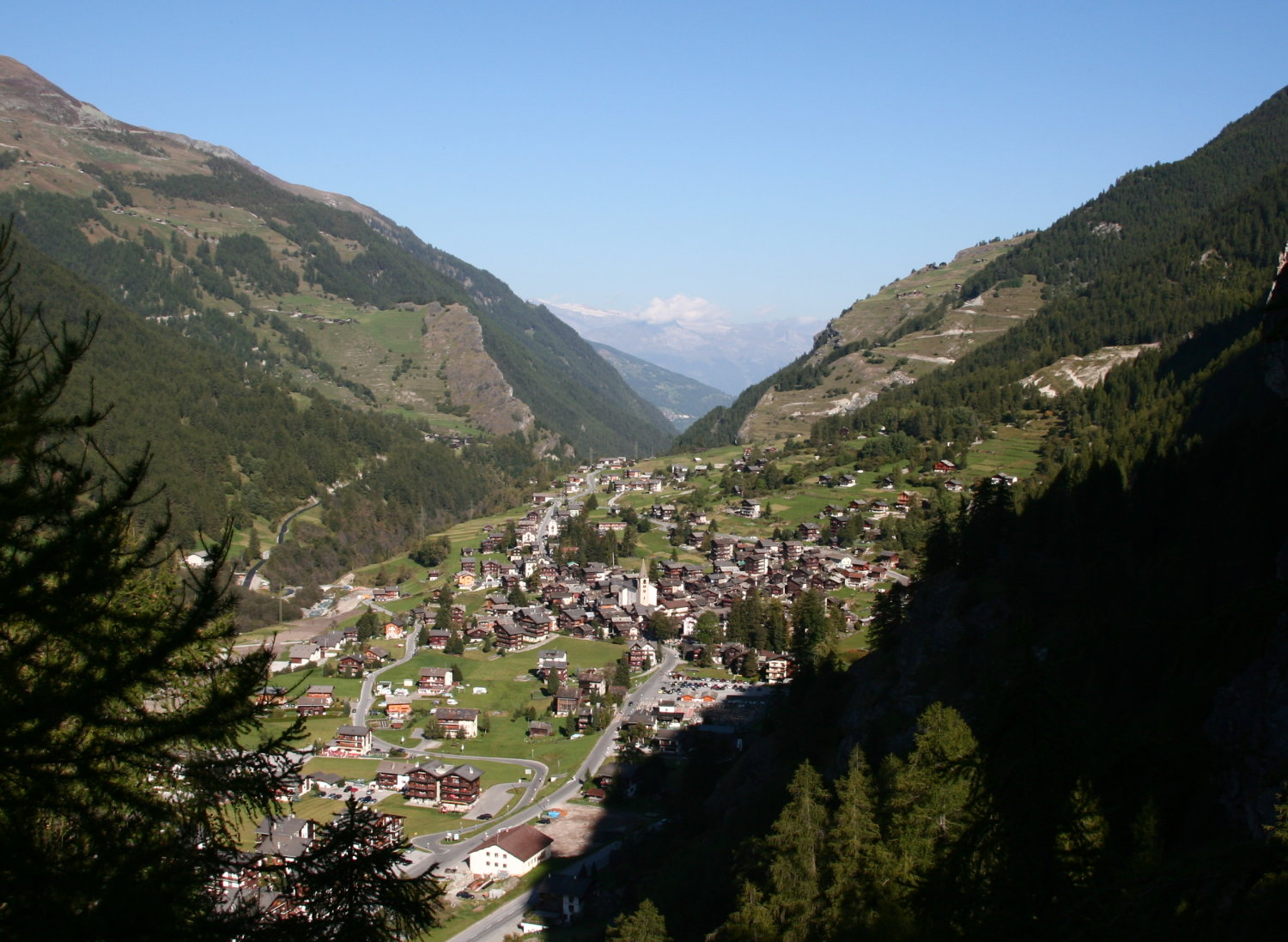

- Flag Coat of arms
- Location of Evolène
- Location within Switzerland Location within Canton of Valais
- Coordinates: 46°7′N 7°30′E
- Country: Switzerland
- Canton: Valais
- District: Hérens

Government
  - Mayor: Virginie Gaspoz

Area
  - Total: 209.9 km^{2} (81.0 sq mi)
- Elevation: 1,371 m (4,498 ft)
- Highest elevation (Dent Blanche): 4,357 m (14,295 ft)

Population (December 2002)
  - Total: 1,559
  - Density: 7.427/km^{2} (19.24/sq mi)
- Time zone: UTC+01:00 (CET)
  - Summer (DST): UTC+02:00 (CEST)
- Postal code: 1983
- SFOS number: 6083
- ISO 3166 code: CH-VS
- Localities: Evolène, Arolla, Ferpècle, La Forclaz, La Gouille, Les Haudères, Lannaz, La Sage, La Tour, Villa
- Surrounded by: Ayer, Bagnes, Bionaz (IT-AO), Grimentz, Hérémence, Saint-Martin, Zermatt
- Twin towns: Châtelaillon-Plage (France)
- Website: www.commune-evolene.ch

Evolène is a municipality in the district of Hérens in the canton of Valais in Switzerland.

It includes the villages of Evolène, Les Haudères, La Sage, Villa, La Forclaz, and Arolla, the hamlets of Lannaz and La Tour, and the hollow of Ferpècle.

== History ==
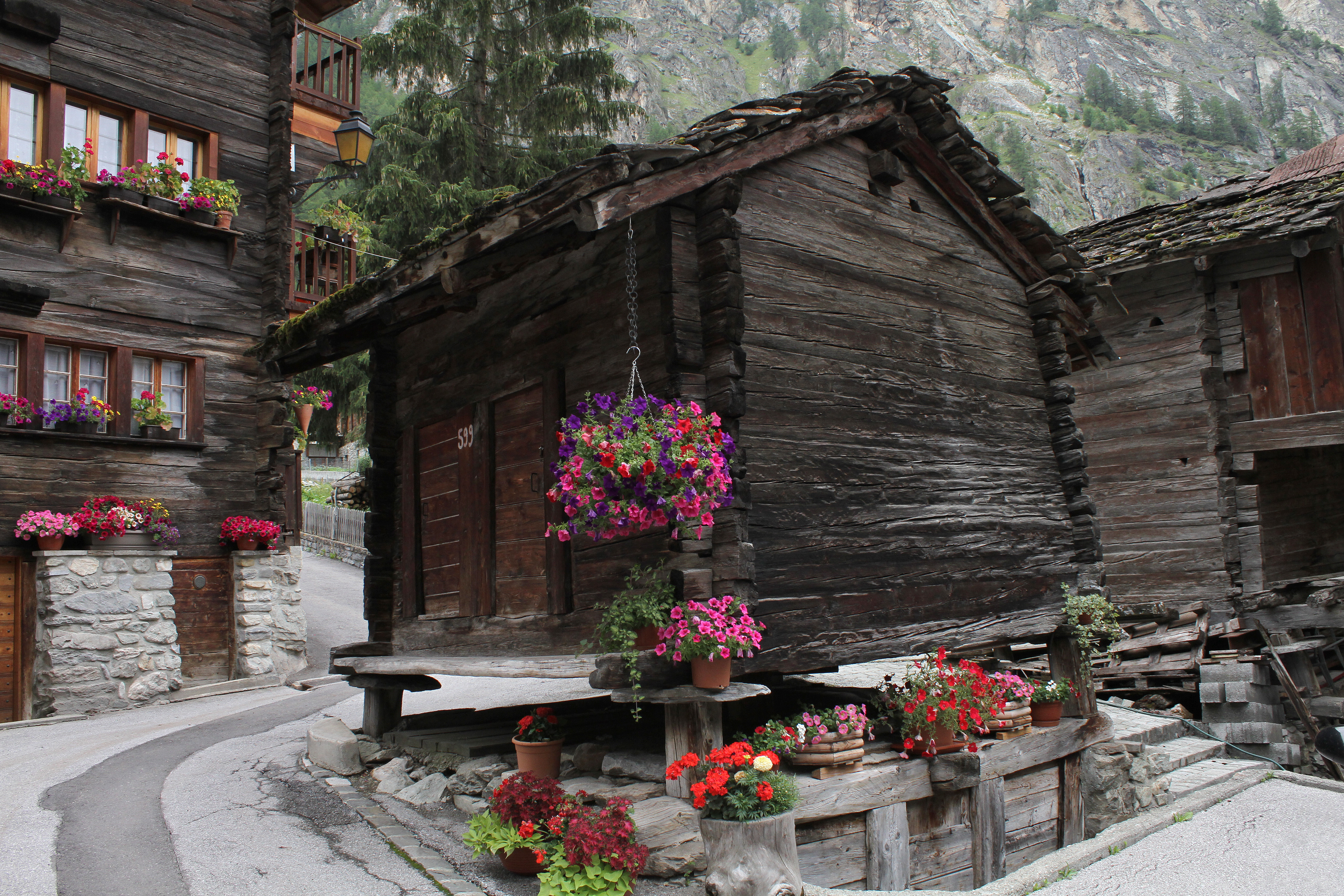
Maison d’habitation in Les Haudères

The prehistoric rock carvings at Alpage De Cotter and the Maison d’habitation in Les Haudères are listed as Swiss heritage site of national significance.

Evolène is first mentioned in 1250 as Ewelina. In 1444 it was mentioned as in loco de Evolena. The municipality was formed in 1882 by division of Hérens municipality into Evolène and Saint-Martin. The blazon of the municipal coat of arms is Azure, issuant from a base Vert a mountain Argent, in chief dexter two Mullets of Five and a bird vollant all Or.

=== Avalanches of 21 February 1999 ===
On 21 February 1999, Evolène was the place of a number of fatal avalanches that caused the deaths of 12 people. This was due to a substantial amount of snow which fell on the Alps during the winter of 1999.

The amount of snow that fell during the end of January and the month of February was huge. In spite of this, the snow was able to retain cohesion due to favourable, relatively constant temperature. The situation, however, worsened on the Thursday the 18th, three days before the drama. Weather reports indicated that temperatures were set to rise and between Thursday night and Friday morning, the temperature rose 5 degrees Celsius. This rapid rise caused a mixing between the old and the new layers of snow. In this state, the risk of an avalanche was considered to be at level 3, on a scale of 5. The situation was still not considered to be critical and therefore it was not seen as necessary to instigate any emergency measures. On Saturday 20 February, the avalanche danger was increased to level 4 due to between 20 and 30 centimeters (7.9 and 11.8 in) of fresh snow that fell on the older, established layers, meaning that the possibility of the new layer literally sliding off the older layer (after slight melting) increased. The temperature remained constant between Saturday (20th) and Sunday 21 February, until midday on Sunday when it began to rapidly rise due to prolonged exposure to the sun.

At precisely 8.27 pm, the first two avalanches were set off on the slopes above Villa, at an altitude around 2,600 m (8,500 ft). They were a combination of fresh powder snow and established spring snow and demolished all trees and chalets in their path, as well as the people unlucky enough to be in the chalets at the time. The two avalanches continued to run along the extremities of Villa and eventually formed as one massive fusion of snow and debris reaching up to 15 m (49 ft) high that came to rest 1,000 m (3,300 ft) down the slope, after taking 12 lives and cutting off the main road between Evolène and des Haudères.

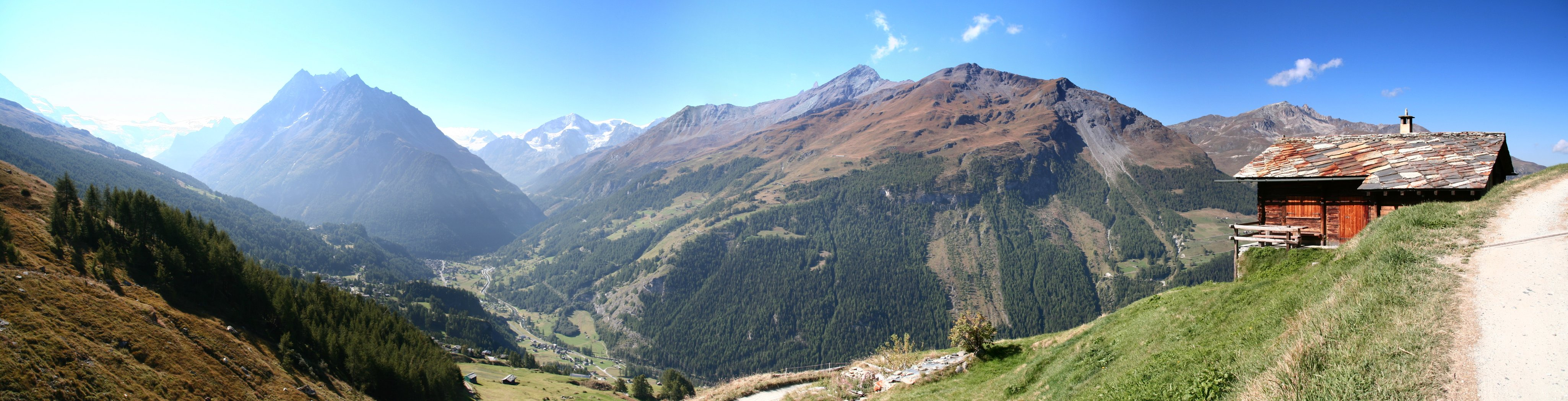
Les Haudères, Val d'Hérens, Valais, Suisse (sept. 2007)

== Geography ==
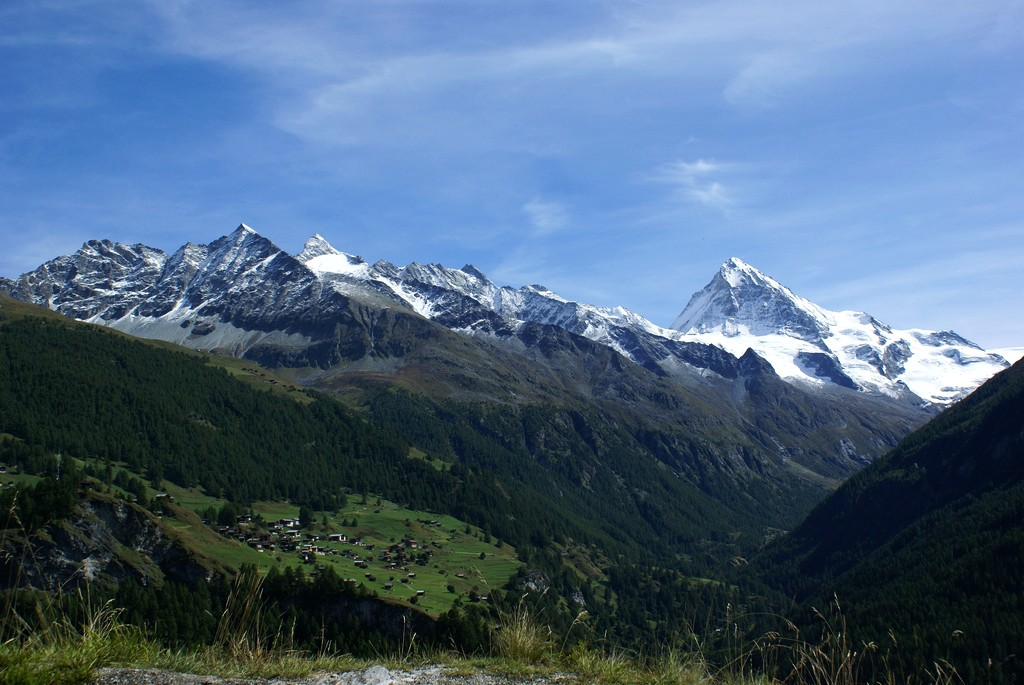
Val d'Hérens

Evolène has an area, as of 2011, of 210 square kilometers (81 mi^{2}). Of this area, 17.7% is used for agricultural purposes, while 12.0% is forested. Of the rest of the land, 0.9% is settled (buildings or roads) and 69.3% is unproductive land.

The municipality is located in the Hérens district and was part of Hérens until 1882.

It is located south of Sion in the Pennine Alps. It is one of the last strongholds of the Franco-Provençal language, being the only village in Switzerland where all generations speak it.

The commune of Evolène is situated in the Val d'Hérens. Evolène is one of the largest municipalities in Switzerland despite having no more than 1,600 inhabitants. This is due to the broken nature of its surrounding alpine terrain, which includes the highest point in the commune, la Dent Blanche (white tooth) at 4,357 m (14,295 ft). Due to its mountain terrain Evolène is subjected to a number of natural dangers such as avalanches and aggressive erosion of its main river due to the recession of three surrounding glaciers.

The commune is made up of several close-lying villages. The main village is Evolène, fortunately situated on a plateau above the river (to avoid flooding of the river), as well as being protected from avalanches by a surrounding forest. Thanks to its favourable position, Evolène was quickly established as the safest village to expand and therefore has become the biggest village in the commune.

Other villages that make up the Evolène commune, such as Arolla, les Haudères, La Sage, La Forclaz and Villa do not benefit from the same level of natural protection as Evolène and are therefore exposed to more risks and have thus become less desirable to develop. The small village of les Haudères is closely situated to Evolène, at the very extremity of Val d'Hérens. The even smaller villages of Villa and La Sage are found about 300 meters (980 ft) up from Evolène. Orientated towards the South, Villa and La Sage benefit from generous sunlight hours. They are also situated near large Swiss mountain meadows which extend up to an altitude of 2,700 meters (8,900 ft). The villages of Evolène and Les Haudères and the hamlet of Lana are part of the Inventory of Swiss Heritage Sites.

=== Climate ===
Climate data for Evolène, elevation 1,825 m (5,988 ft), (1991–2020)
| Month | Jan | Feb | Mar | Apr | May | Jun | Jul | Aug | Sep | Oct | Nov | Dec | Year |
|---|---|---|---|---|---|---|---|---|---|---|---|---|---|
| Mean daily maximum °C (°F) | 0.7 (33.3) | 0.9 (33.6) | 4.4 (39.9) | 8.0 (46.4) | 11.8 (53.2) | 15.7 (60.3) | 18.0 (64.4) | 17.5 (63.5) | 13.7 (56.7) | 10.1 (50.2) | 4.7 (40.5) | 1.8 (35.2) | 8.9 (48.0) |
| Daily mean °C (°F) | −2.6 (27.3) | −2.8 (27.0) | 0.0 (32.0) | 3.1 (37.6) | 6.9 (44.4) | 10.6 (51.1) | 12.7 (54.9) | 12.6 (54.7) | 8.9 (48.0) | 5.7 (42.3) | 1.0 (33.8) | −1.6 (29.1) | 4.5 (40.1) |
| Mean daily minimum °C (°F) | −5.5 (22.1) | −6.0 (21.2) | −3.5 (25.7) | −0.8 (30.6) | 2.9 (37.2) | 6.3 (43.3) | 8.2 (46.8) | 8.6 (47.5) | 5.3 (41.5) | 2.3 (36.1) | −2.1 (28.2) | −4.6 (23.7) | 0.9 (33.6) |
| Average precipitation mm (inches) | 49.3 (1.94) | 39.6 (1.56) | 41.1 (1.62) | 50.0 (1.97) | 81.0 (3.19) | 80.9 (3.19) | 88.3 (3.48) | 84.8 (3.34) | 54.6 (2.15) | 54.1 (2.13) | 54.6 (2.15) | 55.4 (2.18) | 733.7 (28.89) |
| Average snowfall cm (inches) | 56.4 (22.2) | 57.7 (22.7) | 44.4 (17.5) | 32.6 (12.8) | 9.2 (3.6) | 0.3 (0.1) | 0.0 (0.0) | 0.1 (0.0) | 1.6 (0.6) | 12.4 (4.9) | 42.8 (16.9) | 54.0 (21.3) | 311.5 (122.6) |
| Average precipitation days (≥ 1.0 mm) | 7.8 | 7.0 | 7.6 | 7.8 | 11.4 | 10.9 | 11.0 | 11.2 | 7.9 | 7.5 | 7.7 | 8.4 | 106.2 |
| Average snowy days (≥ 1.0 cm) | 7.9 | 8.7 | 8.0 | 5.4 | 1.5 | 0.2 | 0.0 | 0.1 | 0.4 | 2.3 | 6.6 | 8.7 | 49.8 |
| Average relative humidity (%) | 56 | 58 | 60 | 63 | 69 | 70 | 67 | 68 | 70 | 65 | 62 | 58 | 64 |
| Mean monthly sunshine hours | 110.3 | 119.5 | 158.9 | 163.8 | 178.2 | 192.2 | 211.6 | 194.0 | 169.0 | 142.6 | 103.6 | 96.4 | 1,840.1 |
| Percentage possible sunshine | 58 | 58 | 57 | 52 | 48 | 50 | 55 | 57 | 59 | 60 | 54 | 54 | 55 |
Source 1: NOAA
Source 2: MeteoSwiss (snow 1981–2010)

== Demographics ==
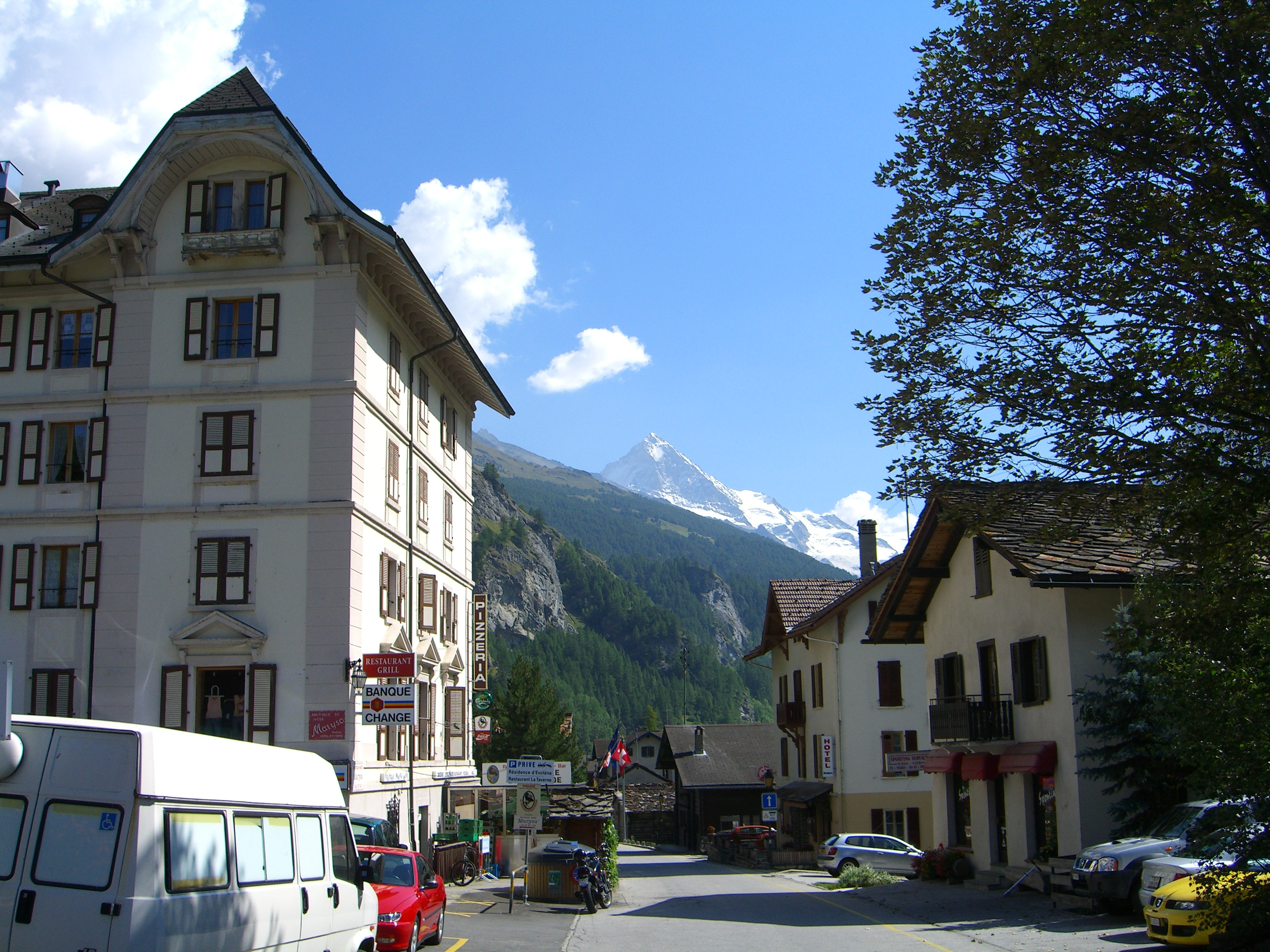
Evolène town

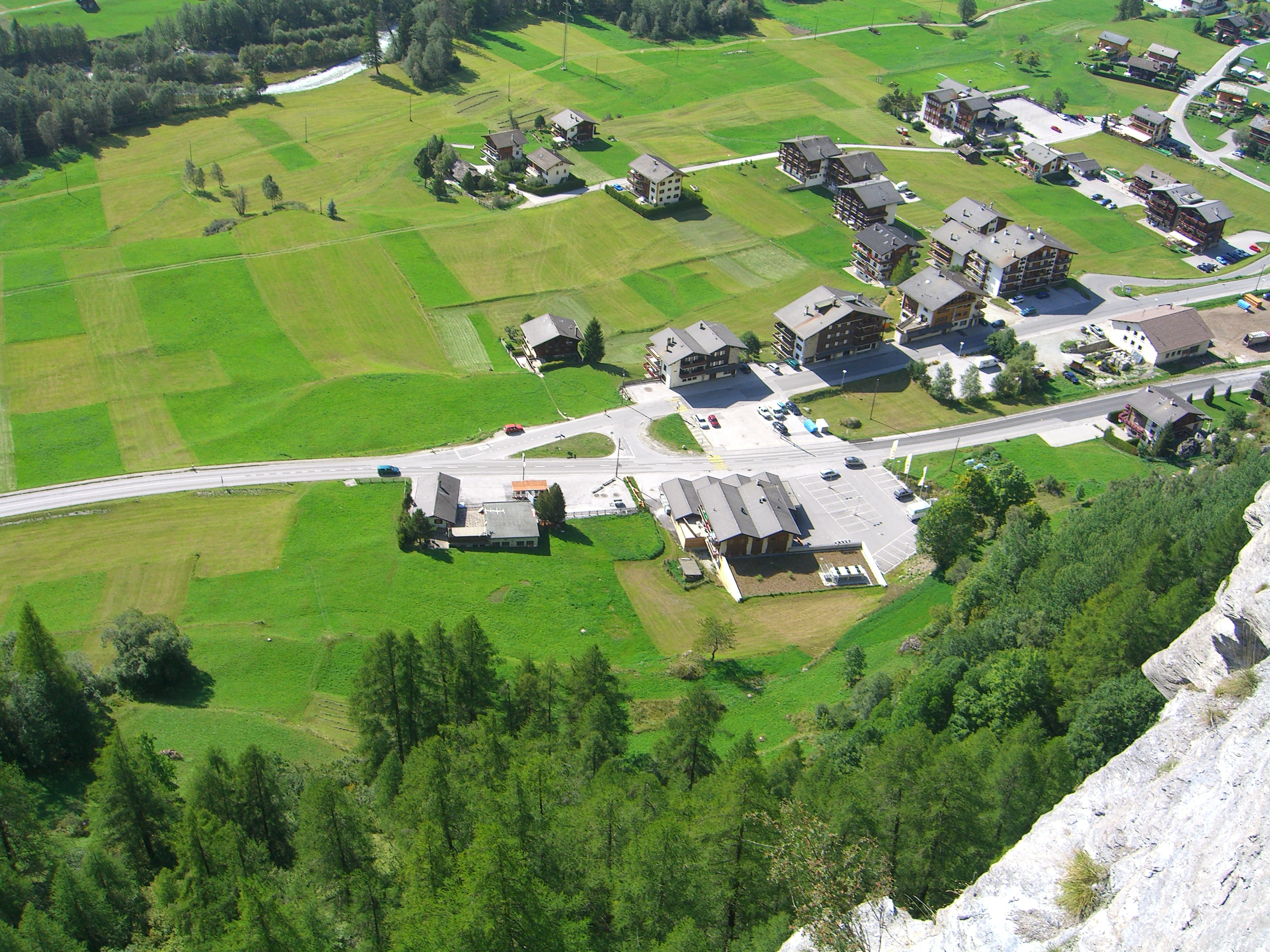
View from above of Evolène

Evolène has a population (as of December 2020) of 1,647. As of 2008, 7.7% of the population are resident foreign nationals. Over the last 10 years (1999–2009) the population has changed at a rate of 5.5%. It has changed at a rate of 2.3% due to migration and at a rate of 1.6% due to births and deaths.

Most of the population (as of 2000) speaks French (1,471 or 96.6%) as their first language, Portuguese is the second most common (20 or 1.3%) and German is the third (13 or 0.9%). There are 7 people who speak Italian.

As of 2008, the gender distribution of the population was 49.1% male and 50.9% female. The population was made up of 745 Swiss men (45.5% of the population) and 58 (3.5%) non-Swiss men. There were 768 Swiss women (46.9%) and 65 (4.0%) non-Swiss women. Of the population in the municipality 1,153 or about 75.8% were born in Evolène and lived there in 2000. There were 111 or 7.3% who were born in the same canton, while 97 or 6.4% were born somewhere else in Switzerland, and 121 or 8.0% were born outside of Switzerland.

The age distribution of the population (as of 2000) is children and teenagers (0–19 years old) make up 24.4% of the population, while adults (20–64 years old) make up 59.7% and seniors (over 64 years old) make up 15.9%.

As of 2000, there were 631 people who were single and never married in the municipality. There were 733 married individuals, 107 widows or widowers and 51 individuals who are divorced.

As of 2000, there were 579 private households in the municipality, and an average of 2.6 persons per household. There were 153 households that consist of only one person and 52 households with five or more people. Out of a total of 598 households that answered this question, 25.6% were households made up of just one person and there were 16 adults who lived with their parents. Of the rest of the households, there are 133 married couples without children, 224 married couples with children There were 39 single parents with a child or children. There were 14 households that were made up of unrelated people and 19 households that were made up of some sort of institution or another collective housing.

In 2000 there were 547 single family homes (or 61.0% of the total) out of a total of 897 inhabited buildings. There were 236 multi-family buildings (26.3%), along with 55 multi-purpose buildings that were mostly used for housing (6.1%) and 59 other use buildings (commercial or industrial) that also had some housing (6.6%).

In 2000, a total of 548 apartments (36.4% of the total) were permanently occupied, while 767 apartments (51.0%) were seasonally occupied and 190 apartments (12.6%) were empty. As of 2009, the construction rate of new housing units was 6.1 new units per 1000 residents. The vacancy rate for the municipality, in 2010, was 2.84%.

The historical population is given in the following chart:

=== Language ===
Evolène is one of the few Swiss-Romande municipalities still using a variety of Arpitan (also known as "Franco-Provençal") for oral communication. Evolène is considered as the last stronghold of the Arpitan language across the Swiss part of its historical domain. However, as children are schooled in French only, only about a third of all children regularly use their regional language among themselves.

=== Religion ===
From the 2000 census, 1,379 or 90.6% were Roman Catholic, while 39 or 2.6% belonged to the Swiss Reformed Church. Of the rest of the population, there were six individuals (or about 0.39% of the population) who belonged to another Christian church. There was one person who was Buddhist and one individual who belonged to another church. 53 (or about 3.48% of the population) belonged to no church, were agnostic or atheist, and 44 individuals (or about 2.89% of the population) did not answer the question.

=== Education ===
In Evolène about 470 or (30.9%) of the population have completed non-mandatory upper secondary education, and 116 or (7.6%) have completed additional higher education (either university or a Fachhochschule). Of the 116 who completed tertiary schooling, 54.3% were Swiss men, 31.9% were Swiss women, 7.8% were non-Swiss men and 6.0% were non-Swiss women.

As of 2000, there were 118 students from Evolène who attended schools outside the municipality.

== Events ==
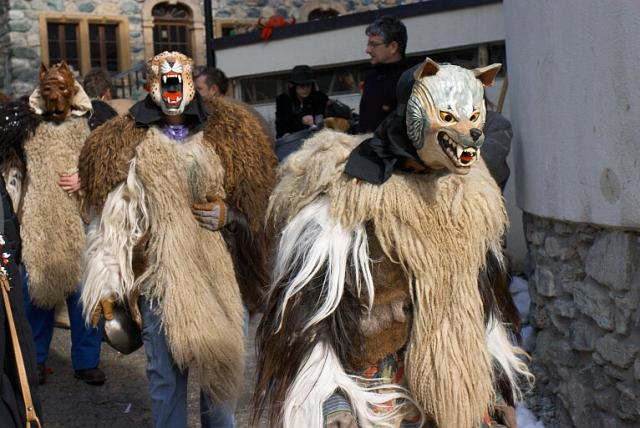
Carnaval in Evolène

The municipality is a popular area for nature lovers and winter sports seekers as well as a popular resort for writers and artists due to its tranquil settings.

Traditional annual cow fights are held around the beginning of May each year (signalling the release of cows after spending the winter indoors) and jointly shared between Evolène, les Haudères and La Sage.

== Politics ==
In the 2007 federal election the most popular party was the CVP which received 57.73% of the vote. The next three most popular parties were the SVP (12.37%), the FDP (10.33%) and the SP (8.82%). In the federal election, a total of 1,128 votes were cast, and the voter turnout was 86.6%.

In the 2009 Conseil d'État/Staatsrat election a total of 1,002 votes were cast, of which 37 or about 3.7% were invalid. The voter participation was 78.5%, which is much more than the cantonal average of 54.67%. In the 2007 Swiss Council of States election a total of 1,109 votes were cast, of which 37 or about 3.3% were invalid. The voter participation was 86.1%, which is much more than the cantonal average of 59.88%.

== Economy ==
As of 2010, Evolène had an unemployment rate of 3.2%. As of 2008, there were 179 people employed in the primary economic sector and about 80 businesses involved in this sector. 99 people were employed in the secondary sector and there were 23 businesses in this sector. 287 people were employed in the tertiary sector, with 91 businesses in this sector. There were 732 residents of the municipality who were employed in some capacity, of which females made up 41.0% of the workforce.

In 2008 the total number of full-time equivalent jobs was 411. The number of jobs in the primary sector was 88, of which 85 were in agriculture and 3 were in forestry or lumber production. The number of jobs in the secondary sector was 95 of which 26 or (27.4%) were in manufacturing and 49 (51.6%) were in construction. The number of jobs in the tertiary sector was 228. In the tertiary sector; 61 or 26.8% were in wholesale or retail sales or the repair of motor vehicles, 17 or 7.5% were in the movement and storage of goods, 94 or 41.2% were in a hotel or restaurant, 4 or 1.8% were the insurance or financial industry, 12 or 5.3% were technical professionals or scientists, 8 or 3.5% were in education and 13 or 5.7% were in health care.

In 2000, there were 14 workers who commuted into the municipality and 238 workers who commuted away. The municipality is a net exporter of workers, with about 17.0 workers leaving the municipality for every one entering. Of the working population, 6.4% used public transportation to get to work, and 61.3% used a private car.

== Twin town ==
Evolène is twinned with the town of Châtelaillon-Plage, France.
