= Ferpècle =

Coordinates: 46.0608°N 7.5497°E

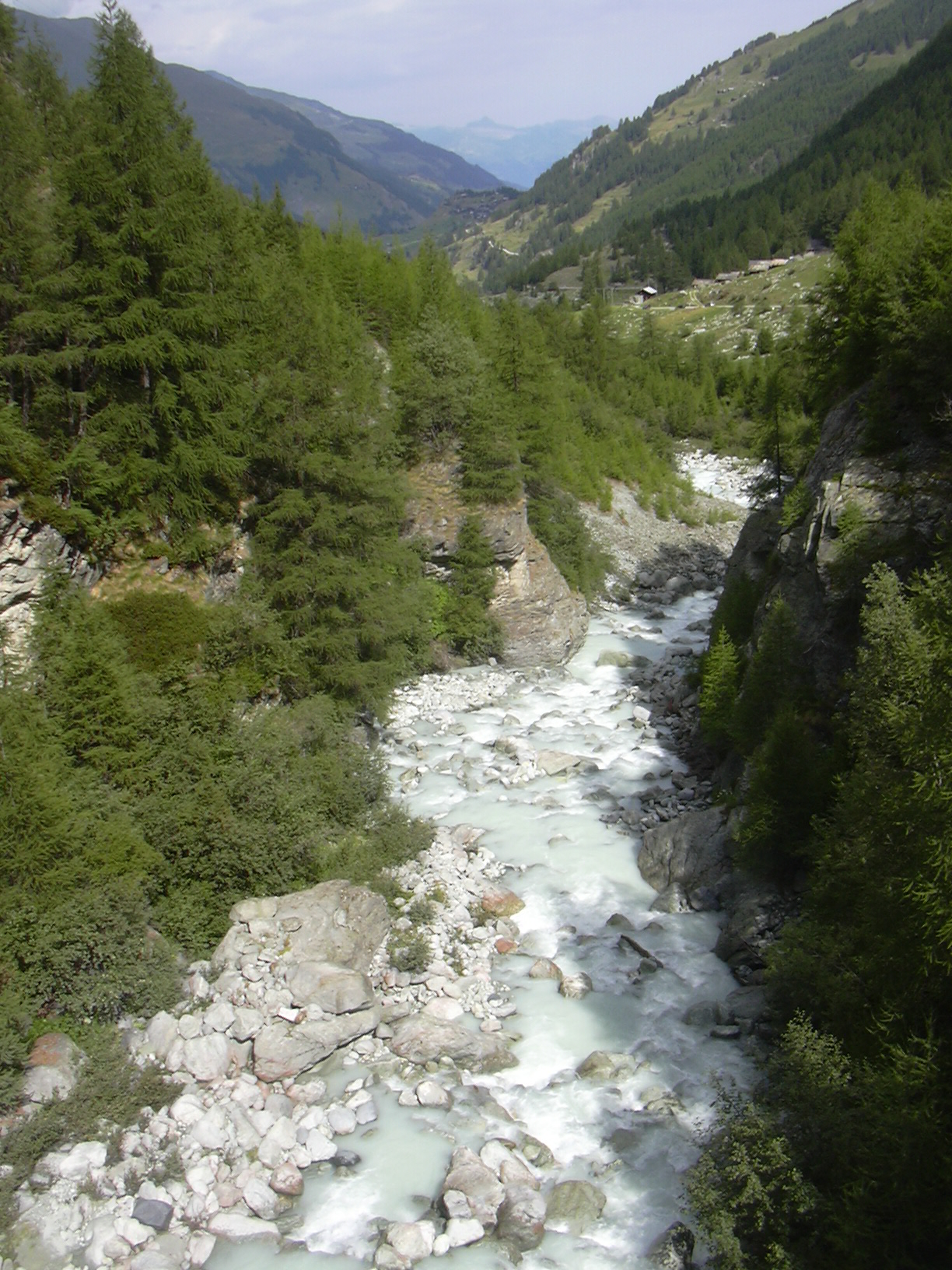
Borgne Valley in Ferpècle

Ferpècle is a dispersed settlement in the upper Val d'Hérens in Valais, Switzerland, upstream of Les Haudères, at between about 1,700 m and 1,800 m elevation, spanning a distance of about 5 km along the Borgne de Ferpècle stream. Like Les Haudères, it is part of Evolène municipality. Individual settlements of Ferpècle are Seppec, Pra Floric, Renoillin and Salay.

Ferpècle serves as starting-point for a number of alpinist excursions, including Ferpècle Glacier and Mont Miné Glacier. Until the 19th century, these two glaciers were still connected, reaching down to just above Salay (1,766 m). Since the later 19th century, the glacier has retreated and become separated into two non-contiguous parts, forming the two sources of the Borgne de Ferpècle. At 1,880 m, a dam was built in 1964 to prevent inundations.
