= Saint-Martin, Valais =

Saint-Martin
- Municipality
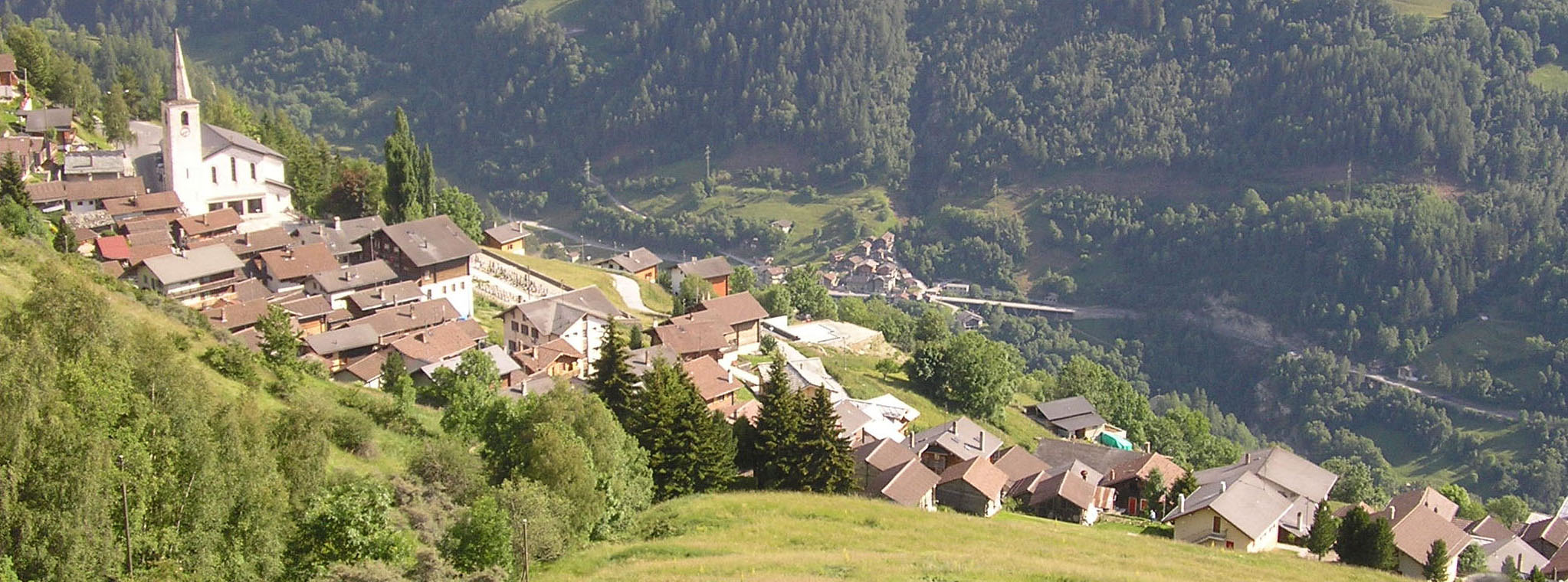
- Saint-Martin village

- Flag Coat of arms
- Location of Saint-Martin
- Location within Switzerland Location within Canton of Valais
- Coordinates: 46°10′N 7°26′E
- Country: Switzerland
- Canton: Valais
- District: Hérens

Area
  - Total: 37 km^{2} (14 sq mi)
- Elevation: 1,411 m (4,629 ft)

Population (December 2002)
  - Total: 875
  - Density: 24/km^{2} (61/sq mi)
- Time zone: UTC+01:00 (CET)
  - Summer (DST): UTC+02:00 (CEST)
- Postal code: 1969
- SFOS number: 6087
- ISO 3166 code: CH-VS
- Surrounded by: Evolène, Grimentz, Hérémence, Mase, Nax, Vex
- Website: www.saint-martin.ch

Saint-Martin (French pronunciation: [sɛ̃ maʁtɛ̃]; Arpitan: Sent-Martin) is a municipality in the district of Hérens in the canton of Valais in Switzerland.

== History ==
Aerial view (1955)

Saint-Martin is first mentioned in 1224 as Sanctum Martinum.

== Geography ==
Saint-Martin has an area, as of 2011, of 37 square kilometers (14 mi^{2}). Of this area, 33.0% is used for agricultural purposes, while 42.9% is forested. Of the rest of the land, 2.4% is settled (buildings or roads) and 21.8% is unproductive land.

The municipality is located in the Hérens district. It consists of the villages of Saint-Martin, Suen, Trogne, Eison, Liez, Praz-Jean and La Luette as well as a pair of hamlets including Ossona.

== Coat of arms ==
The blazon of the municipal coat of arms is Azure on a Mount Vert St. Martin robed Or on a Horse Argent cutting his Coat Gules to share with a Beggar Proper.

== Demographics ==
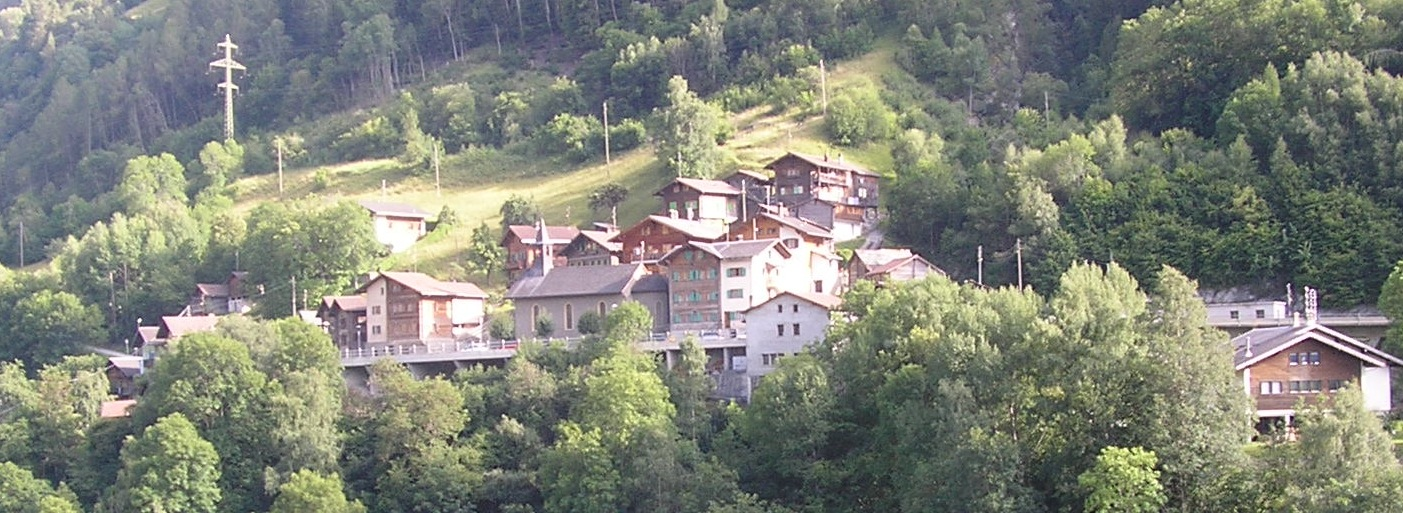
La Luette village

Saint-Martin has a population (as of December 2020) of 842. As of 2008, 3.2% of the population are resident foreign nationals. Over the last 10 years (1999–2009) the population has changed at a rate of -3.9%. It has changed at a rate of 2.4% due to migration and at a rate of -2.4% due to births and deaths.

Most of the population (as of 2000) speaks French (887 or 98.9%) as their first language, German is the second most common (5 or 0.6%) and Portuguese is the third (2 or 0.2%). There is 1 person who speaks Italian.

As of 2008, the gender distribution of the population was 48.0% male and 52.0% female. The population was made up of 432 Swiss men (46.1% of the population) and 18 (1.9%) non-Swiss men. There were 473 Swiss women (50.5%) and 14 (1.5%) non-Swiss women. Of the population in the municipality 690 or about 76.9% were born in Saint-Martin and lived there in 2000. There were 84 or 9.4% who were born in the same canton, while 63 or 7.0% were born somewhere else in Switzerland, and 29 or 3.2% were born outside of Switzerland.

The age distribution of the population (as of 2000) is children and teenagers (0–19 years old) make up 22.1% of the population, while adults (20–64 years old) make up 54.7% and seniors (over 64 years old) make up 23.2%.

As of 2000, there were 338 people who were single and never married in the municipality. There were 488 married individuals, 56 widows or widowers and 15 individuals who are divorced.

As of 2000, there were 342 private households in the municipality, and an average of 2.6 persons per household. There were 83 households that consist of only one person and 31 households with five or more people. Out of a total of 349 households that answered this question, 23.8% were households made up of just one person and there were 7 adults who lived with their parents. Of the rest of the households, there are 111 married couples without children, 124 married couples with children There were 12 single parents with a child or children. There were 5 households that were made up of unrelated people and 7 households that were made up of some sort of institution or another collective housing.

In 2000 there were 225 single family homes (or 60.5% of the total) out of a total of 372 inhabited buildings. There were 114 multi-family buildings (30.6%), along with 18 multi-purpose buildings that were mostly used for housing (4.8%) and 15 other use buildings (commercial or industrial) that also had some housing (4.0%).

In 2000, a total of 337 apartments (59.8% of the total) were permanently occupied, while 185 apartments (32.8%) were seasonally occupied and 42 apartments (7.4%) were empty. The vacancy rate for the municipality, in 2010, was 8.28%.

The historical population is given in the following chart:

== Politics ==
In the 2007 federal election the most popular party was the CVP which received 60.42% of the vote. The next three most popular parties were the SVP (15.46%), the FDP (11.8%) and the SP (9.82%). In the federal election, a total of 599 votes were cast, and the voter turnout was 77.8%.

== Economy ==
As of 2010, Saint-Martin had an unemployment rate of 2.5%. As of 2008, there were 32 people employed in the primary economic sector and about 19 businesses involved in this sector. 86 people were employed in the secondary sector and there were 19 businesses in this sector. 80 people were employed in the tertiary sector, with 27 businesses in this sector. There were 397 residents of the municipality who were employed in some capacity, of which females made up 40.8% of the workforce.

In 2008 the total number of full-time equivalent jobs was 155. The number of jobs in the primary sector was 16, all of which were in agriculture. The number of jobs in the secondary sector was 80 of which 64 or (80.0%) were in manufacturing and 16 (20.0%) were in construction. The number of jobs in the tertiary sector was 59. In the tertiary sector; 11 or 18.6% were in wholesale or retail sales or the repair of motor vehicles, 17 or 28.8% were in the movement and storage of goods, 10 or 16.9% were in a hotel or restaurant, 2 or 3.4% were the insurance or financial industry, 3 or 5.1% were technical professionals or scientists, 5 or 8.5% were in education.

In 2000, there were 30 workers who commuted into the municipality and 282 workers who commuted away. The municipality is a net exporter of workers, with about 9.4 workers leaving the municipality for every one entering. Of the working population, 14.9% used public transportation to get to work, and 70.3% used a private car.

== Religion ==
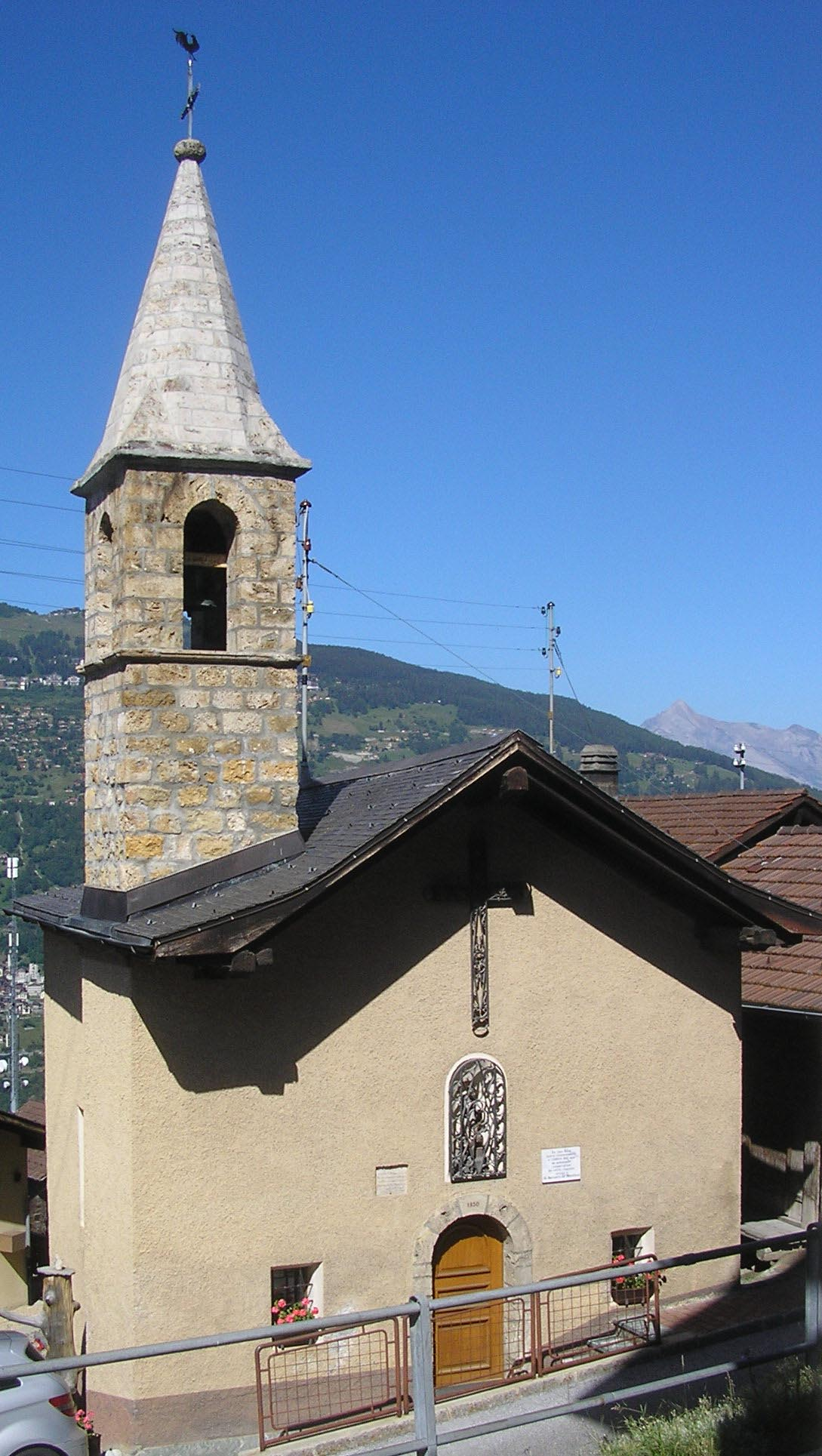
Chapel in Saint-Martin

From the 2000 census, 827 or 92.2% were Roman Catholic, while 20 or 2.2% belonged to the Swiss Reformed Church. Of the rest of the population, there were 5 individuals (or about 0.56% of the population) who belonged to another Christian church. There was 1 individual who was Jewish, and 10 (or about 1.11% of the population) belonged to no church, are agnostic or atheist, and 36 individuals (or about 4.01% of the population) did not answer the question.

== Education ==
In Saint-Martin about 296 or (33.0%) of the population have completed non-mandatory upper secondary education, and 56 or (6.2%) have completed additional higher education (either university or a Fachhochschule). Of the 56 who completed tertiary schooling, 66.1% were Swiss men, 30.4% were Swiss women.

As of 2000, there were 2 students in Saint-Martin who came from another municipality, while 62 residents attended schools outside the municipality.
