= Vex, Switzerland =

Vex
- Municipality
- Vex from Nax

- Flag Coat of arms
- Location of Vex
- Location within Switzerland Location within Canton of Valais
- Coordinates: 46°13′N 7°24′E
- Country: Switzerland
- Canton: Valais
- District: Hérens

Government
  - Mayor: Daniel Defago

Area
  - Total: 13.0 km^{2} (5.0 sq mi)
- Elevation: 939 m (3,081 ft)

Population (December 2002)
  - Total: 1,388
  - Density: 107/km^{2} (277/sq mi)
- Time zone: UTC+01:00 (CET)
  - Summer (DST): UTC+02:00 (CEST)
- Postal code: 1981
- SFOS number: 6089
- ISO 3166 code: CH-VS
- Surrounded by: Hérémence, Les Agettes, Mase, Nax, Nendaz, Saint-Martin, Sion, Vernamiège
- Website: www.vex.ch

Vex (Arpitan: Vés) is a municipality and capital of the district of Hérens in the canton of Valais in Switzerland.

== Geography ==
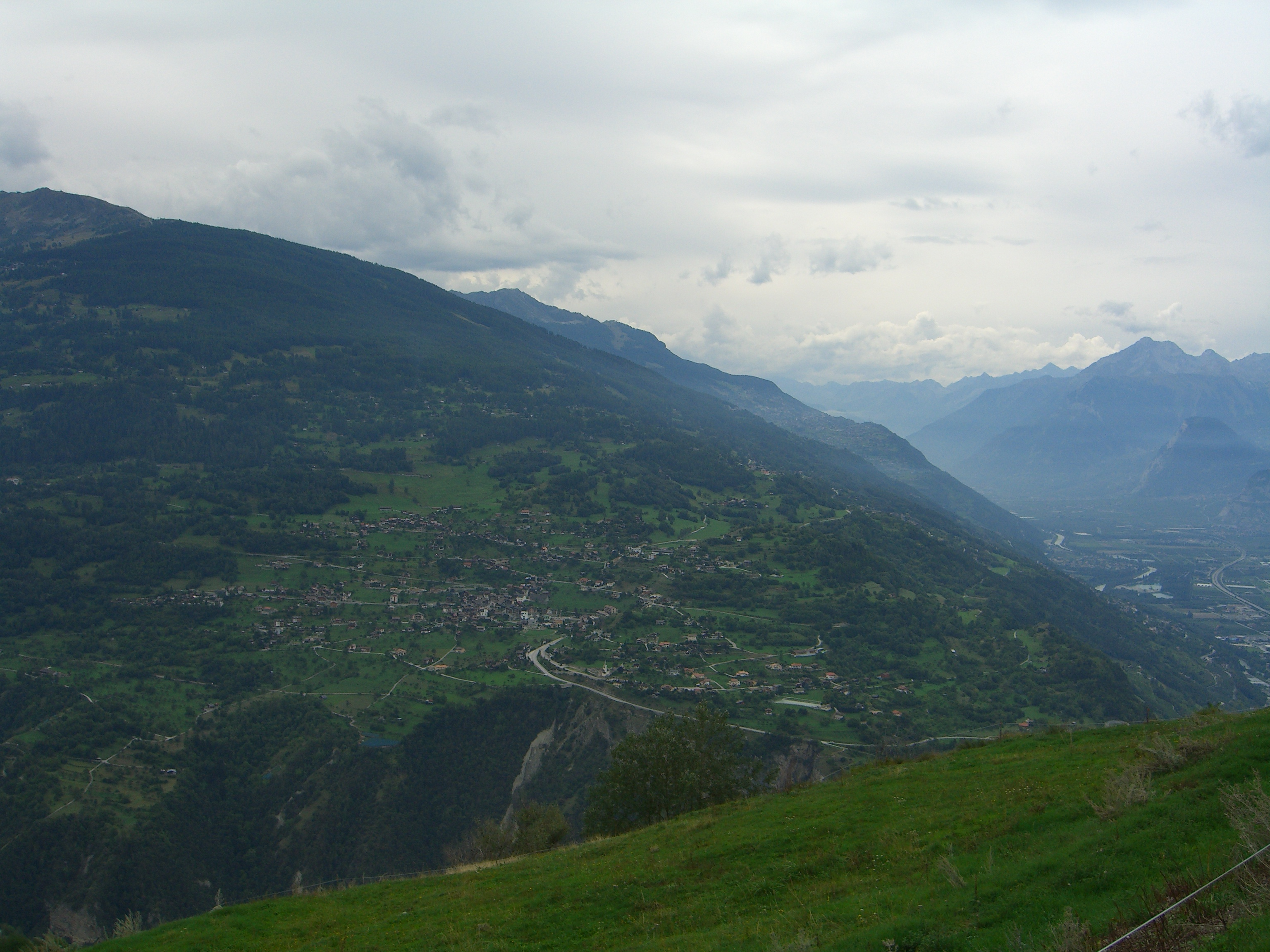
Vex and Les Agettes

Aerial view (1955)

Vex has an area, as of 2009, of 13 square kilometers (5.0 mi^{2}). Of this area, 4.17 km^{2} (1.61 mi^{2}) or 32.1% is used for agricultural purposes, while 6.17 km^{2} (2.38 mi^{2}) or 47.5% is forested. Of the rest of the land, 1.71 km^{2} (0.66 mi^{2}) or 13.2% is settled (buildings or roads), 0.07 km^{2} (17 acres) or 0.5% is either rivers or lakes and 0.87 km^{2} (0.34 mi^{2}) or 6.7% is unproductive land.

Of the built up area, housing and buildings made up 7.2% and transportation infrastructure made up 4.8%. Out of the forested land, 38.6% of the total land area is heavily forested and 7.7% is covered with orchards or small clusters of trees. Of the agricultural land, 0.2% is used for growing crops and 18.3% is pastures, while 2.5% is used for orchards or vine crops and 11.0% is used for alpine pastures. All the water in the municipality is flowing water. Of the unproductive areas, 5.7% is unproductive vegetation.

== Coat of arms ==
The blazon of the municipal coat of arms is Azure, a Chevronelle inverted couped Argent between three Mullets of Five of the same and Coupeaux Vert in base.

== Demographics ==
Vex has a population (as of December 2020) of 1,792. As of 2008, 11.3% of the population are resident foreign nationals. Over the last 10 years (1999–2009 ) the population has changed at a rate of 23.8%. It has changed at a rate of 23% due to migration and at a rate of -0.7% due to births and deaths.

Most of the population (as of 2000) speaks French (1,216 or 92.8%) as their first language, German is the second most common (38 or 2.9%) and Portuguese is the third (30 or 2.3%). There are 4 people who speak Italian.

As of 2008, the gender distribution of the population was 50.7% male and 49.3% female. The population was made up of 724 Swiss men (44.4% of the population) and 103 (6.3%) non-Swiss men. There were 721 Swiss women (44.2%) and 83 (5.1%) non-Swiss women. Of the population in the municipality 535 or about 40.8% were born in Vex and lived there in 2000. There were 350 or 26.7% who were born in the same canton, while 157 or 12.0% were born somewhere else in Switzerland, and 173 or 13.2% were born outside of Switzerland.

The age distribution of the population (as of 2000) is children and teenagers (0–19 years old) make up 24.1% of the population, while adults (20–64 years old) make up 56.9% and seniors (over 64 years old) make up 19%.

As of 2000, there were 526 people who were single and never married in the municipality. There were 604 married individuals, 126 widows or widowers and 55 individuals who are divorced.

As of 2000, there were 514 private households in the municipality, and an average of 2.3 persons per household. There were 180 households that consist of only one person and 28 households with five or more people. Out of a total of 528 households that answered this question, 34.1% were households made up of just one person and there were 6 adults who lived with their parents. Of the rest of the households, there are 129 married couples without children, 169 married couples with children There were 24 single parents with a child or children. There were 6 households that were made up of unrelated people and 14 households that were made up of some sort of institution or another collective housing.

In 2000 there were 626 single family homes (or 72.3% of the total) out of a total of 866 inhabited buildings. There were 135 multi-family buildings (15.6%), along with 51 multi-purpose buildings that were mostly used for housing (5.9%) and 54 other use buildings (commercial or industrial) that also had some housing (6.2%).

In 2000, a total of 498 apartments (28.4% of the total) were permanently occupied, while 1,186 apartments (67.7%) were seasonally occupied and 69 apartments (3.9%) were empty. As of 2009, the construction rate of new housing units was 15.3 new units per 1000 residents.

The historical population is given in the following chart:

== Politics ==
In the 2007 federal election the most popular party was the CVP which received 37.97% of the vote. The next three most popular parties were the FDP (21.97%), the SVP (19.71%) and the SP (12.57%). In the federal election, a total of 724 votes were cast, and the voter turnout was 68.6%.

In the 2009 Conseil d'État/Staatsrat election a total of 676 votes were cast, of which 41 or about 6.1% were invalid. The voter participation was 63.3%, which is much more than the cantonal average of 54.67%. In the 2007 Swiss Council of States election a total of 718 votes were cast, of which 52 or about 7.2% were invalid. The voter participation was 69.4%, which is much more than the cantonal average of 59.88%.

== Economy ==
As of 2010, Vex had an unemployment rate of 2.8%. As of 2008, there were 50 people employed in the primary economic sector and about 18 businesses involved in this sector. 58 people were employed in the secondary sector and there were 11 businesses in this sector. 309 people were employed in the tertiary sector, with 57 businesses in this sector. There were 644 residents of the municipality who were employed in some capacity, of which females made up 43.3% of the workforce.

In 2008 the total number of full-time equivalent jobs was 331. The number of jobs in the primary sector was 34, of which 20 were in agriculture and 14 were in forestry or lumber production. The number of jobs in the secondary sector was 54 of which 1 was in manufacturing and 53 (98.1%) were in construction. The number of jobs in the tertiary sector was 243. In the tertiary sector; 42 or 17.3% were in wholesale or retail sales or the repair of motor vehicles, 16 or 6.6% were in the movement and storage of goods, 55 or 22.6% were in a hotel or restaurant, 13 or 5.3% were the insurance or financial industry, 6 or 2.5% were technical professionals or scientists, 10 or 4.1% were in education and 53 or 21.8% were in health care.

In 2000, there were 153 workers who commuted into the municipality and 406 workers who commuted away. The municipality is a net exporter of workers, with about 2.7 workers leaving the municipality for every one entering. Of the working population, 8.9% used public transportation to get to work, and 71.4% used a private car.

== Religion ==
From the 2000 census, 1,047 or 79.9% were Roman Catholic, while 78 or 5.9% belonged to the Swiss Reformed Church. Of the rest of the population, there were 5 members of an Orthodox church (or about 0.38% of the population), there was 1 individual who belongs to the Christian Catholic Church, and there was 1 individual who belongs to another Christian church. There was 1 individual who was Jewish, and 4 (or about 0.31% of the population) who were Islamic. There was 1 person who was Buddhist and 1 individual who belonged to another church. 57 (or about 4.35% of the population) belonged to no church, are agnostic or atheist, and 115 individuals (or about 8.77% of the population) did not answer the question.

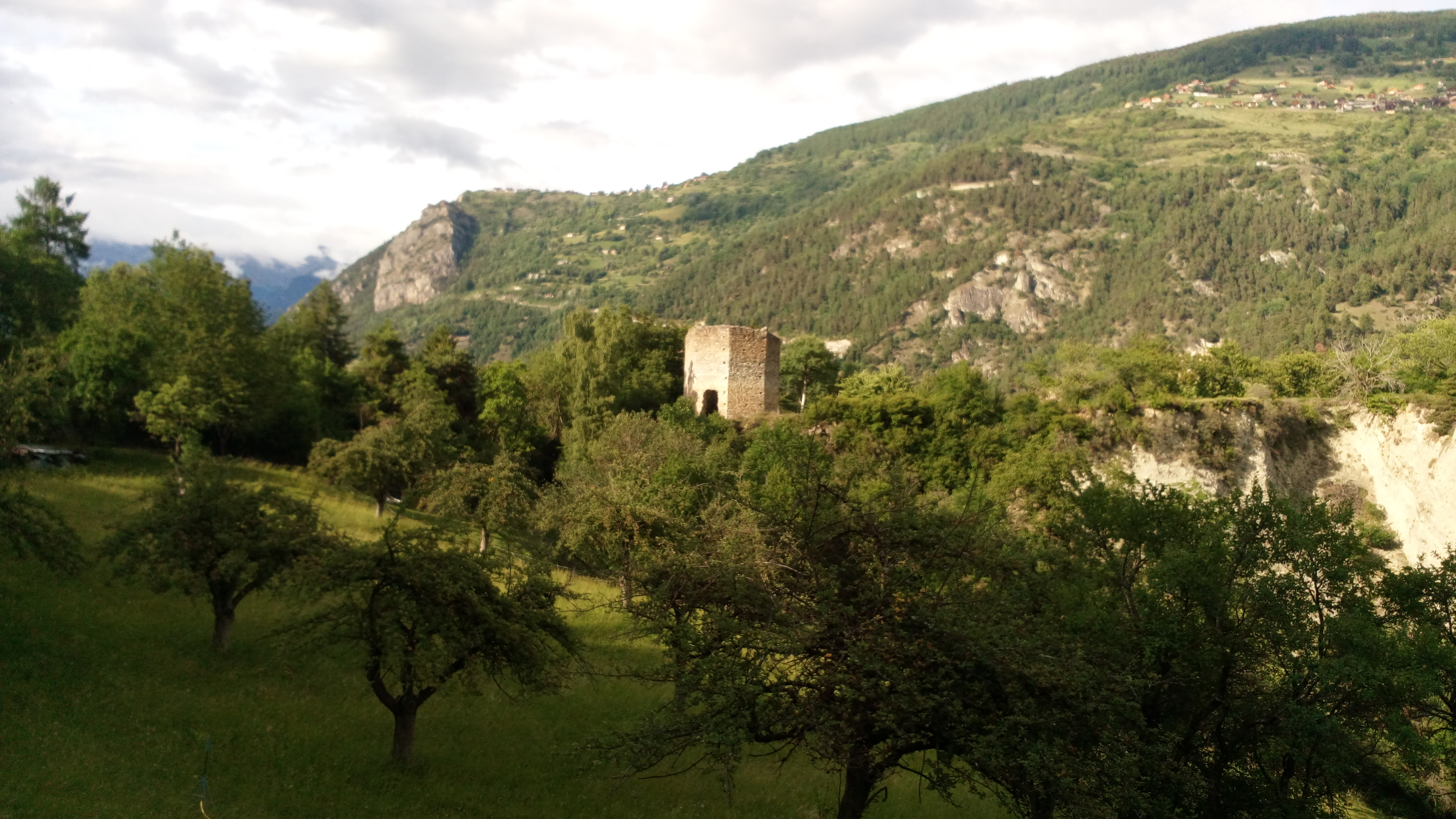
The Tavelli tower; named after a local bishop.

== Education ==
In Vex about 448 or (34.2%) of the population have completed non-mandatory upper secondary education, and 125 or (9.5%) have completed additional higher education (either university or a Fachhochschule). Of the 125 who completed tertiary schooling, 57.6% were Swiss men, 28.8% were Swiss women, 7.2% were non-Swiss men and 6.4% were non-Swiss women. As of 2000, there were 25 students in Vex who came from another municipality, while 69 residents attended schools outside the municipality.

Vex is home to the Bibliothèque de Vex library. The library has (as of 2008) 4,671 books or other media, and loaned out 6,911 items in the same year. It was open a total of 79 days with average of 6 hours per week during that year.
