= Hérémence =

- Municipality
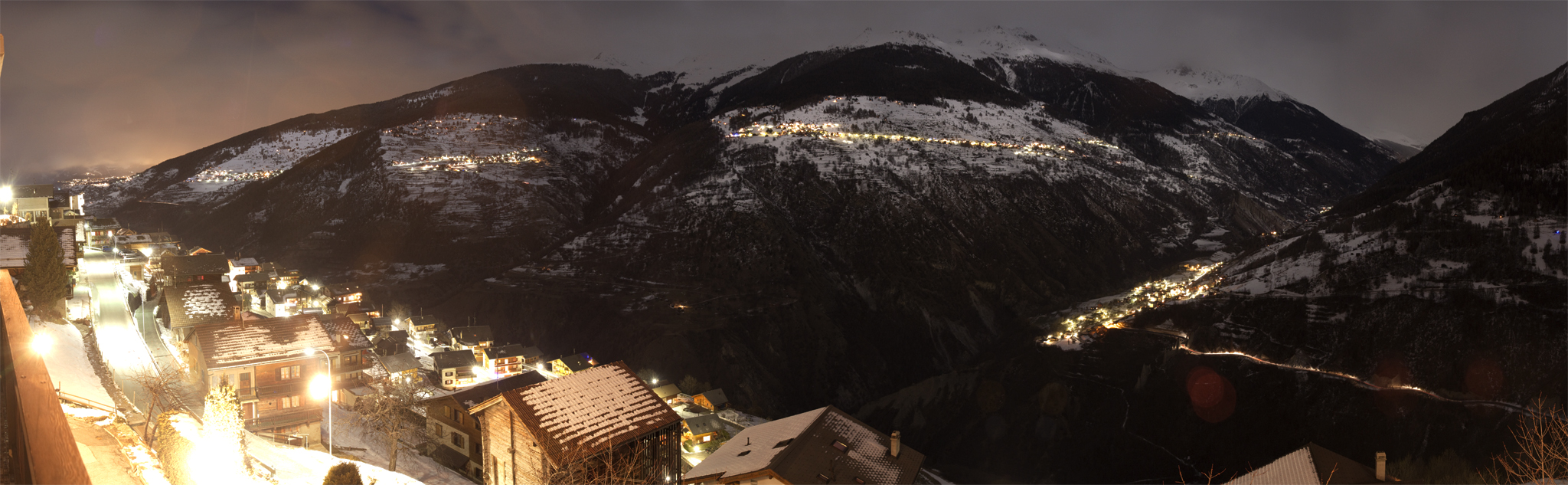

- Flag Coat of arms
- Location of Hérémence
- Location within Switzerland Location within Canton of Valais
- Coordinates: 46°11′N 7°24′E
- Country: Switzerland
- Canton: Valais
- District: Hérens

Government
  - Mayor: Régis Bovier

Area
  - Total: 107.5 km^{2} (41.5 sq mi)
- Elevation: 1,237 m (4,058 ft)

Population (December 2002)
  - Total: 1,321
  - Density: 12.29/km^{2} (31.83/sq mi)
- Time zone: UTC+01:00 (CET)
  - Summer (DST): UTC+02:00 (CEST)
- Postal code: 1987
- SFOS number: 6084
- ISO 3166 code: CH-VS
- Surrounded by: Bagnes, Evolène, Nendaz, Saint-Martin, Vex
- Website: www.heremence.ch

Hérémence is a municipality in the district of Hérens in the canton of Valais in Switzerland.

== History ==
Hérémence is first mentioned in 1195 as Aremens.

== Geography ==
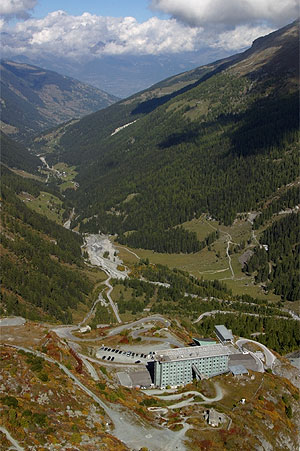
Hotel du Barrage and Dixence valley below the La Grande Dixence dam

Aerial view (1955)

Hérémence has an area, as of 2011, of 107.6 square kilometers (41.5 mi^{2}). Of this area, 18.0% is used for agricultural purposes, while 18.8% is forested. Of the rest of the land, 1.9% is settled (buildings or roads) and 61.3% is unproductive land.

The municipality is located in the Hérens district, on the left side of the Borgne and the Dixence rivers. The village of Hérémence is at the confluence of the two rivers. It includes the entire Dixence valley, which is one of the side valleys off the main Rhone valley. It consists of the village of Hérémence and the hamlets of Ayer, Euseigne, Mâche, Pralong, Riod and Cerise.

== Coat of arms ==
The blazon of the municipal coat of arms is Gules, a Mullet Argent.

== Demographics ==
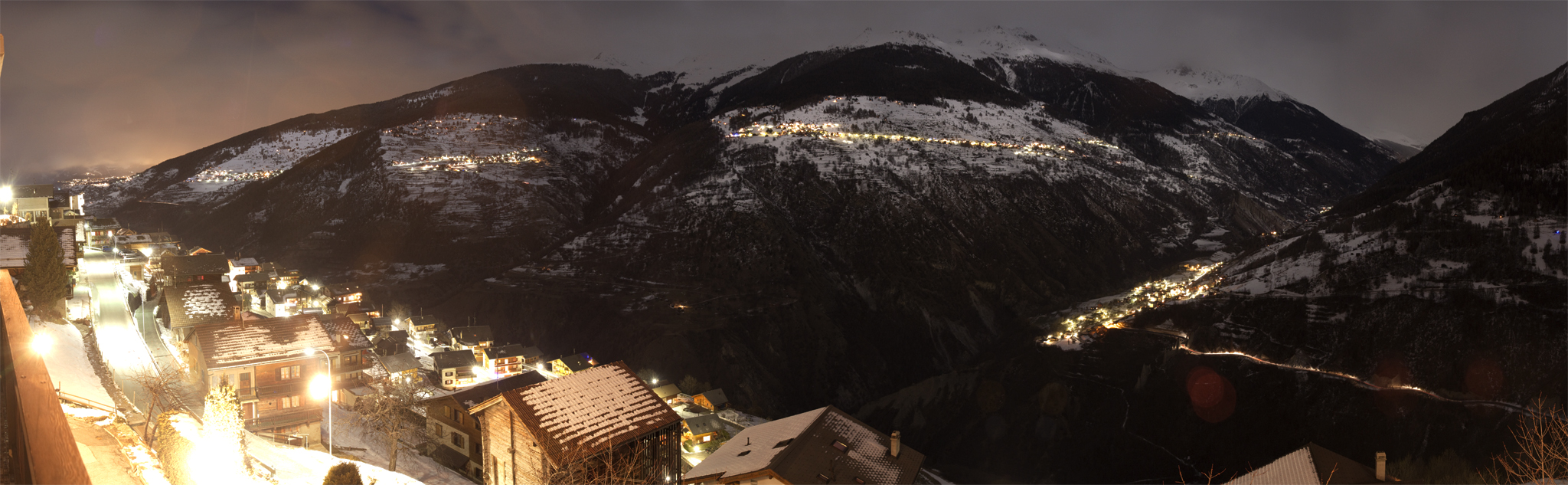
Hérémence at night

Hérémence has a population (as of December 2020) of 1,433. As of 2008, 5.7% of the population are resident foreign nationals. Over the last 10 years (1999–2009), the population has changed at a rate of -0.5%. It has changed at a rate of 7.4% due to migration and at a rate of -5.4% due to births and deaths.

Most of the population (as of 2000) speaks French (1,262 or 97.5%) as their first language, German is the second most common (18 or 1.4%) and Portuguese is the third (7 or 0.5%). There are four people who speak Italian.

As of 2008, the gender distribution of the population was 49.6% male and 50.4% female. The population was made up of 613 Swiss men (46.5% of the population) and 41 (3.1%) non-Swiss men. There were 629 Swiss women (47.7%) and 36 (2.7%) non-Swiss women. Of the population in the municipality 228 or about (17.6%) were born in Hérémence and lived there in 2000. There were 32 (or 2.5%) who were born in the same canton, while 14 (or 1.1%) were born somewhere else in Switzerland, and 27 (or 2.1%) were born outside of Switzerland.

The age distribution of the population (as of 2000) is children and teenagers (0–19 years old) make up 20.2% of the population, while adults (20–64 years old) make up 59.2% and seniors (over 64 years old) make up 20.6%.

As of 2000, there were 548 people who were single and never married in the municipality. There were 644 married individuals, 83 widows or widowers and 19 individuals who are divorced.

As of 2000, there were 450 private households in the municipality, and an average of 2.6 persons per household. There were 144 households that consist of only one person and 52 households with five or more people. Out of a total of 523 households that answered this question, 27.5% were households made up of just one person and there were 13 adults who lived with their parents. Of the rest of the households, there are 134 married couples without children, 126 married couples with children There were 20 single parents with a child or children. There were 13 households that were made up of unrelated people and 73 households that were made up of some sort of institution or another collective housing.

In 2000, there were 149 single family homes (or 42.3% of the total) out of a total of 352 inhabited buildings. There were 179 multi-family buildings (50.9%), along with 17 multi-purpose buildings that were mostly used for housing (4.8%) and seven other use buildings (commercial or industrial) that also had some housing (2.0%).

In 2000, a total of 450 apartments (63.8% of the total) were permanently occupied, while 161 apartments (22.8%) were seasonally occupied and 94 apartments (13.3%) were empty. As of 2009, the construction rate of new housing units was 9.9 new units per 1,000 residents. The vacancy rate for the municipality, in 2010, was 0.48%.

The historical population is given in the following chart:

== Heritage sites of national significance ==
The Saint-Nicolas Church, the aux Fées cave, and the La Grande Dixence dam are listed as Swiss heritage site of national significance. The village of Hérémence and the hamlet of Mâche / Mâchette are both part of the Inventory of Swiss Heritage Sites.

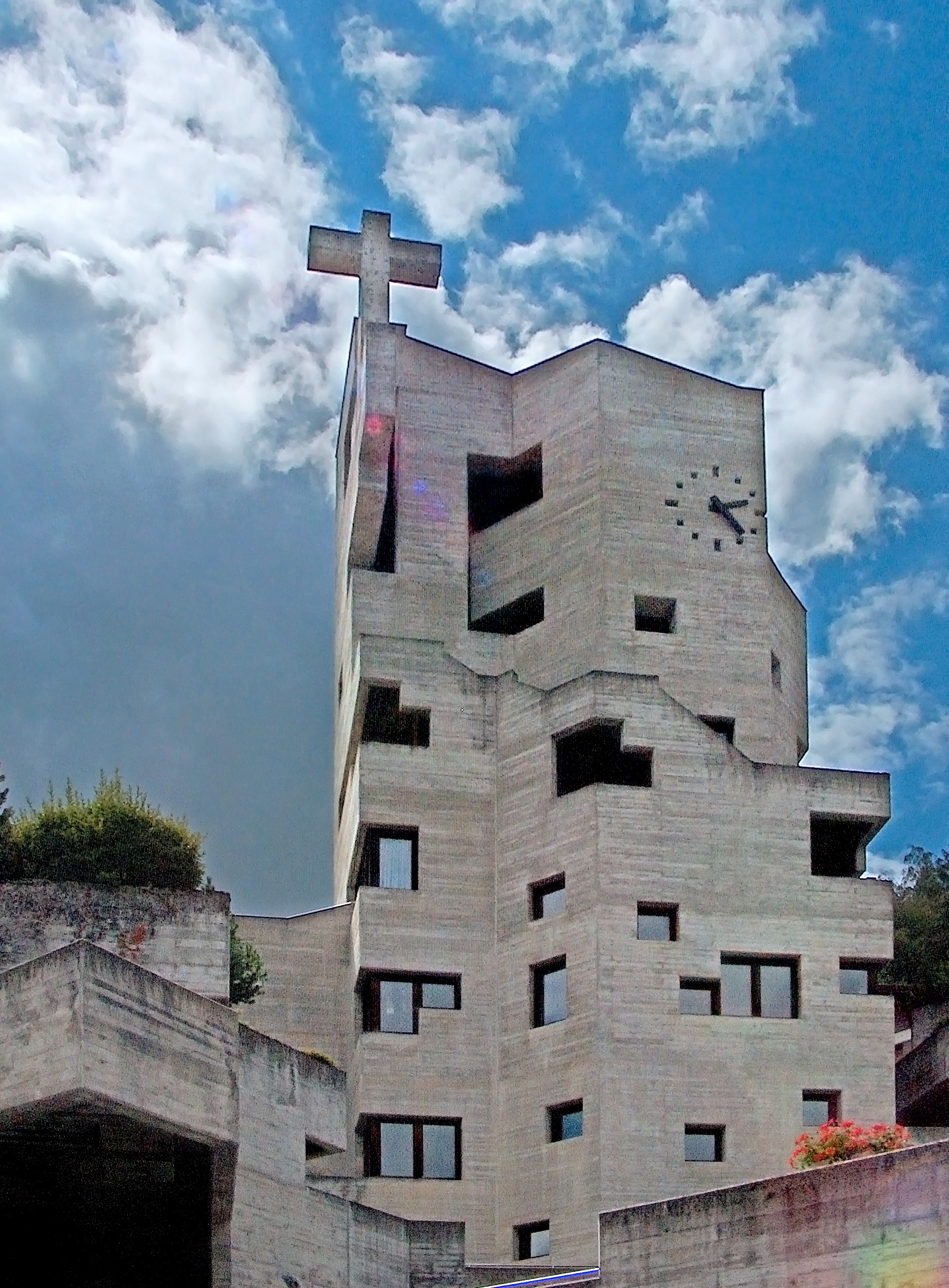
Saint-Nicolas Church, Hérémence

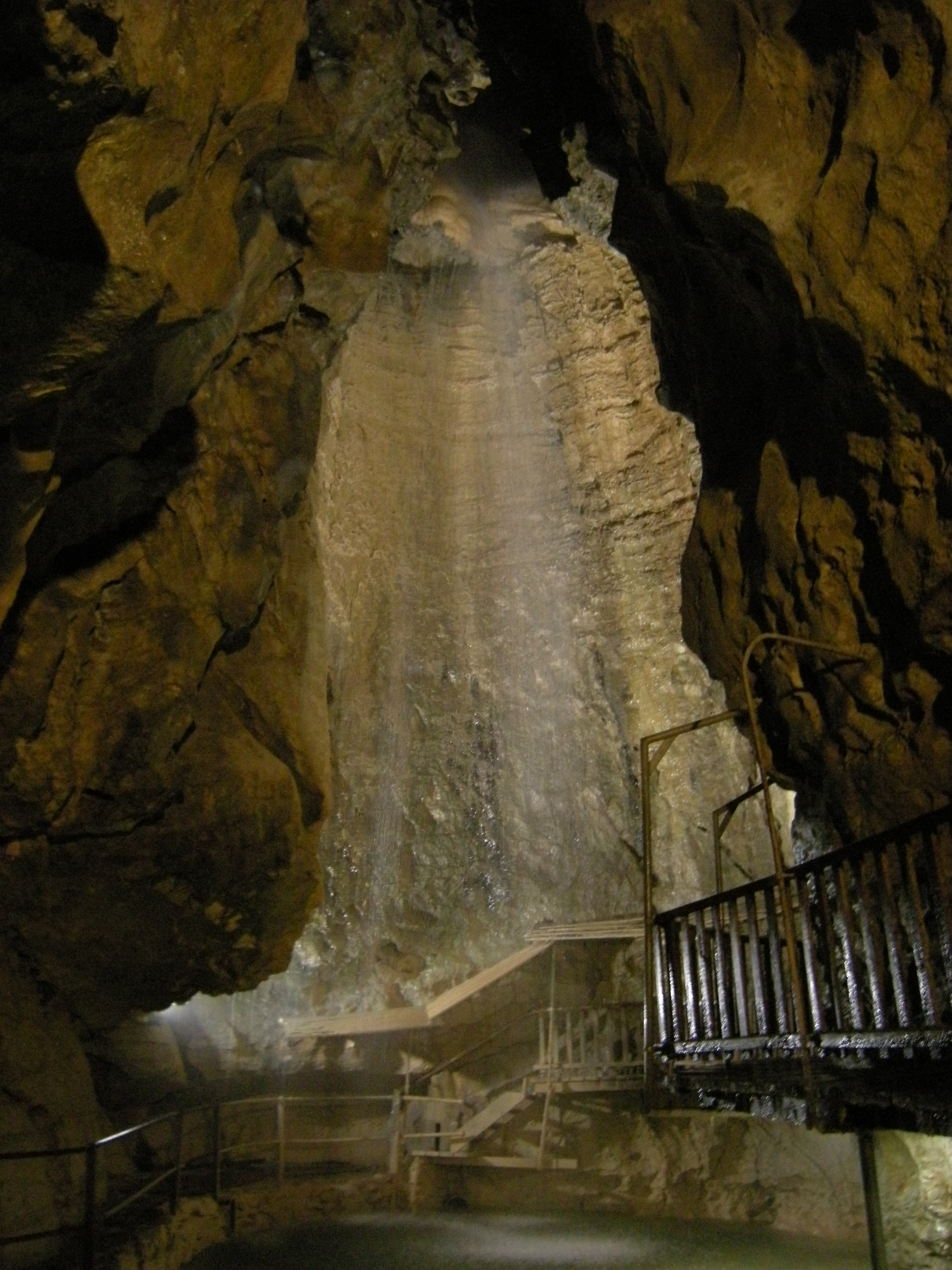
aux Fées cave

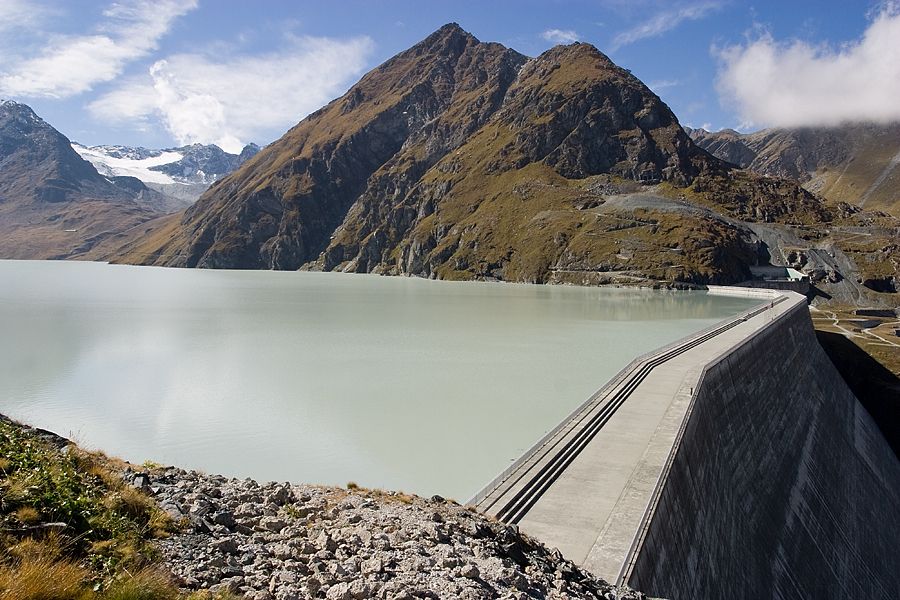
La Grande Dixence

== Politics ==
In the 2007 federal election, the most popular party was the CVP, which received 56.8% of the vote. The next three most popular parties were the SVP (23.33%), the SP (8.98%) and the FDP (4.57%). In the federal election, a total of 802 votes were cast, and the voter turnout was 71.3%.

In the 2009 Conseil d'État/Staatsrat election, a total of 754 votes were cast, of which 45 (or about 6.0%) were invalid. The voter participation was 68.2%, which is much more than the cantonal average of 54.67%. In the 2007 Swiss Council of States election, a total of 794 votes were cast, of which 38 (or about 4.8%) were invalid. The voter participation was 72.6%, which is much more than the cantonal average of 59.88%.

== Economy ==
As of 2010, Hérémence had an unemployment rate of 2.6%. As of 2008, there were 50 people employed in the primary economic sector and about 29 businesses involved in this sector. One hundred and ninety-two people were employed in the secondary sector and there were 13 businesses in this sector. One hundred and sixty-four people were employed in the tertiary sector, with 39 businesses in this sector. There were 576 residents of the municipality who were employed in some capacity, of which females made up 43.9% of the workforce.

In 2008, the total number of full-time equivalent jobs was 323. The number of jobs in the primary sector was 24, all of which were in agriculture. The number of jobs in the secondary sector was 182 of which 50 (or 27.5%) were in manufacturing and 131 (72.0%) were in construction. The number of jobs in the tertiary sector was 117. In the tertiary sector, 12 (or 10.3%) were in wholesale or retail sales or the repair of motor vehicles, 15 (or 12.8%) were in the movement and storage of goods, 29 (or 24.8%) were in a hotel or restaurant, one was the insurance or financial industry, two (or 1.7%) were technical professionals or scientists, 25 or 21.4% were in education and eight (or 6.8%) were in health care.

In 2000, there were 89 workers who commuted into the municipality and 338 workers who commuted away. The municipality is a net exporter of workers, with about 3.8 workers leaving the municipality for every one entering. Of the working population, 14.8% used public transportation to get to work, and 52.3% used a private car.

== Religion ==
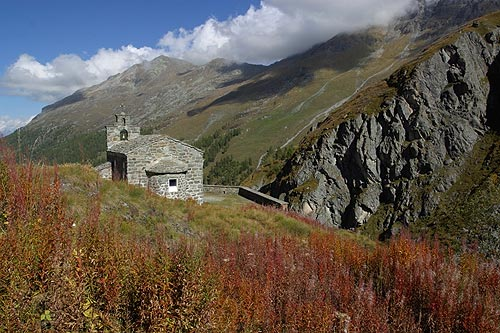
St. Jean chapel below the Grande Dixence dam

From the 2000 census, 1,239 (or 95.7%) were Roman Catholic, while 40 or (3.1%) belonged to the Swiss Reformed Church. Of the rest of the population, there was one member of an Orthodox church, and there was one individual who belongs to another Christian church. Four (or about 0.31% of the population) belonged to no church, are agnostic or atheist, and nine individuals (or about 0.70% of the population) did not answer the question.

== Weather ==
Hérémence has an average of 99.8 days of rain or snow per year and on average receives 776 mm (30.6 in) of precipitation. The wettest month is June, during which time Hérémence receives an average of 78 mm (3.1 in) of rain or snow. During this month, there is precipitation for an average of 10.1 days. The driest month of the year is April with an average of 51 mm (2.0 in) of precipitation over 7.7 days.

== Education ==
In Hérémence, about six (or 0.5% of the population) have completed non-mandatory upper secondary education, and six or (0.5%) have completed additional higher education (either university or a Fachhochschule). Of the six who completed tertiary schooling, 66.7% were Swiss men, and 33.3% were Swiss women.

As of 2000, there were 146 students in Hérémence who came from another municipality, while 35 residents attended schools outside the municipality.

Hérémence is home to the Bibliothèque communale et scolaire library. The library has (as of 2008) 5,335 books or other media, and loaned out 2,156 items in the same year. It was open a total of 300 days with average of seven hours per week during that year.

== Literature ==
- Alexandre Bourdin: HEREMENCE, son passé et notes sur le Val d'Hérens. (1973); Imprimerie Gessler S.A., Sion; Editions du Château, Sion; 220 pp. (OpenLibrary)
