= Hérens District =

Coordinates: 46°11′38″N 7°25′26″E

Hérens District d'Hérens
- District
- Flag Coat of arms
- Country: Switzerland
- Canton: Valais
- Capital: Vex

Area
  - Total: 443.5 km^{2} (171.2 sq mi)

Population (2020)
  - Total: 10,953
  - Density: 24.70/km^{2} (63.96/sq mi)
- Time zone: UTC+1 (CET)
  - Summer (DST): UTC+2 (CEST)
- Municipalities: 6

The district of Hérens is a district in the canton of Valais in Switzerland. It has a population of 10,953 (as of 31 December 2020).

== Geography ==
Except for the municipality of Ayent, which lies on the north bank of the Rhône, the municipalities of Hérens are located in the Val d'Hérens on the south bank of the Rhône.

== Municipalities ==
It comprises the following municipalities:

Municipality	Population (31 December 2020)	Area km^{2}
Ayent	4,137	55.13
Evolène	1,647	209.94
Hérémence	1,433	107.53
Mont-Noble	1,102	43.0
Saint-Martin	842	37.02
Vex	1,792	12.99
Total	10,953	470.73

== History ==
After the conquest of Lower Valais by the bishopric of Sion (1476), the Val d’Hérens became subordinate to the reeve of Saint-Maurice. In 1560, it was incorporated into the tithing of Sion, with the exception of Val d'Hérémence, which remained a bailiwick of the Seven Tithings. Hérémence district was formed in 1798 (Helvetic Republic), transformed into its own tithing in the Rhodanic Republic of 1802, and into a canton within the French département du Simplon in 1810. In 1815, it was restored as a tithing (after 1848 called district) within the canton of Valais of the restored Swiss Confederacy, with the addition of Ayent municipality. Arbaz and Savièse were detached from Hérémence under the revised constitution of 1839.

The blazon of the municipal coat of arms is Azure, on three mounts Vert a Ram passant Argent horned Or between two Mullets Or in chief.

On 1 January 2011 the former municipalities of Vernamiège, Nax and Mase merged to form the new municipality of Mont-Noble. The municipality of Les Agettes on 1 January 2017 merged into Sion.

== Demographics ==
Hérens has a population (as of December 2020) of 10,953. Most of the population (as of 2000) speaks French (8,582 or 95.0%) as their first language, German is the second most common (203 or 2.2%) and Portuguese is the third (100 or 1.1%). There are 40 people who speak Italian and 1 person who speaks Romansh.

As of 2008, the gender distribution of the population was 49.3% male and 50.7% female. The population was made up of 4,578 Swiss men (44.7% of the population) and 467 (4.6%) non-Swiss men. There were 4,748 Swiss women (46.4%) and 442 (4.3%) non-Swiss women. Of the population in the district 5,042 or about 55.8% were born in Hérens and lived there in 2000. There were 1,210 or 13.4% who were born in the same canton, while 781 or 8.6% were born somewhere else in Switzerland, and 707 or 7.8% were born outside of Switzerland.

As of 2000, there were 3,544 people who were single and never married in the district. There were 4,616 married individuals, 625 widows or widowers and 244 individuals who are divorced.

There were 1,031 households that consist of only one person and 265 households with five or more people. Out of a total of 3,703 households that answered this question, 27.8% were households made up of just one person and there were 80 adults who lived with their parents. Of the rest of the households, there are 1,014 married couples without children, 1,189 married couples with children There were 161 single parents with a child or children. There were 66 households that were made up of unrelated people and 162 households that were made up of some sort of institution or another collective housing.

The historical population is given in the following chart:

== Politics ==
In the 2007 federal election the most popular party was the CVP which received 47.67% of the vote. The next three most popular parties were the SP (17.26%), the SVP (15.57%) and the FDP (11.21%). In the federal election, a total of 5,651 votes were cast, and the voter turnout was 71.8%.

In the 2009 Conseil d'État/Staatsrat election a total of 5,035 votes were cast, of which 245 or about 4.9% were invalid. The voter participation was 65.0%, which is much more than the cantonal average of 54.67%. In the 2007 Swiss Council of States election a total of 5,571 votes were cast, of which 285 or about 5.1% were invalid. The voter participation was 72.4%, which is much more than the cantonal average of 59.88%.

== Religion ==
From the 2000 census, 7,939 or 87.9% were Roman Catholic, while 363 or 4.0% belonged to the Swiss Reformed Church. Of the rest of the population, there were 23 members of an Orthodox church (or about 0.25% of the population), there was 1 individual who belongs to the Christian Catholic Church, and there were 34 individuals (or about 0.38% of the population) who belonged to another Christian church. There were 3 individuals (or about 0.03% of the population) who were Jewish, and 15 (or about 0.17% of the population) who were Islamic. There were 4 individuals who were Buddhist, 1 person who was Hindu and 5 individuals who belonged to another church. 313 (or about 3.47% of the population) belonged to no church, are agnostic or atheist, and 339 individuals (or about 3.75% of the population) did not answer the question.

== Education ==
In Hérens about 2,559 or (28.3%) of the population have completed non-mandatory upper secondary education, and 710 or (7.9%) have completed additional higher education (either University or a Fachhochschule). Of the 710 who completed tertiary schooling, 58.3% were Swiss men, 28.0% were Swiss women, 6.8% were non-Swiss men and 6.9% were non-Swiss women.
