= Couronne de Bréona =

Mountain in Switzerland

- Location within Switzerland

Highest point
- Elevation: 3,159 m (10,364 ft)
- Prominence: 172 m (564 ft)
- Parent peak: Monte Rosa
- Coordinates: 46°05′30″N 07°34′14″E

Geography
- Location: Valais, Switzerland
- Parent range: Pennine Alps

The Couronne de Bréona, 3,159 m (10,364 ft) is a mountain of the Pennine Alps, located east of Les Haudères in the canton of Valais. It lies north of the Tsa de l'Ano, on the range between the valleys of Hérens and Moiry.

Bréona is the name of an extensive alpine pasture to the south-west of the peak, spanning elevations between some 2,200 to 2,800 m (7,200 to 9,200 ft), making it one of the highest pastures in the Alps altogether. Ascending from La Forclaz, Mayens de Bréona is reached at 2,087 m (6,847 ft), and the main buildings of Bréona alpage at 2,200 m (7,200 ft). At 2,320 m (7,610 ft), the path turns right to avoid a gravel field called Liapey d'Enfer, and at 2,435 m (7,989 ft) reaches Remointse de Bréona, the temporary and more elevated shelters of the alpage. The Bréona pasture stretches from here to 2,600 m (8,500 ft) and above, with a well structure indicated at 2,623 m (8,606 ft). From here, the path ascends to Col de Bréona at 2,916 m (9,567 ft), separating the Serra Neire to the southwest from the Couronne de Bréona to the southeast, and via Col du Tsaté (2,868 m [9,409 ft]) traversing to Pinte du Bandon (3,064 m [10,052 ft]) to the northwest. Beyond the main peak of Couronne de Bréona is a secondary summit, called Clocher de la Couronne at 3,101 m (10,174 ft), separated by the Col de la Couronne (2,987 m [9,800 ft]) from Pointe de Moiry (3,303 m [10,837 ft]) to the south.
