= Avalanche =

Rapid flow of a mass of snow down a slope

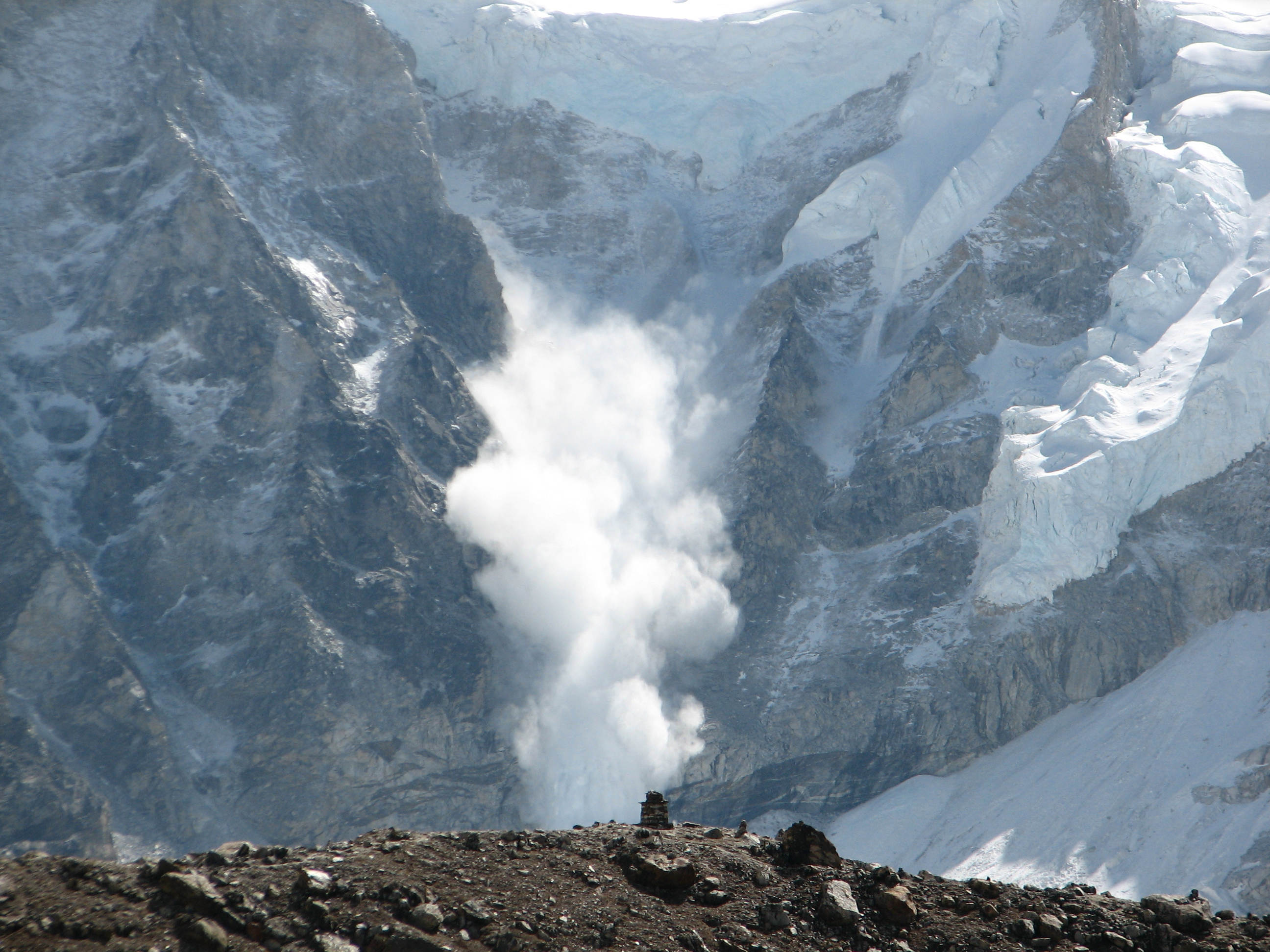
A powder snow avalanche in the Himalayas near Mount Everest

An avalanche is a rapid flow of snow down a slope, such as a hill or mountain. Avalanches can be triggered spontaneously, by factors such as increased precipitation or snowpack weakening, or by external means such as humans, other animals, and earthquakes. Primarily composed of flowing snow and air, large avalanches have the capability to capture and move ice, rocks, and trees.

Avalanches occur in two general forms, or combinations thereof: slab avalanches made of tightly packed snow, triggered by a collapse of an underlying weak snow layer, and loose snow avalanches made of looser snow. After being set off, avalanches usually accelerate rapidly and grow in mass and volume as they capture more snow. If an avalanche moves fast enough, some of the snow may mix with the air, forming a powder snow avalanche.

Though they appear to share similarities, avalanches are distinct from slush flows, mudslides, rock slides, and serac collapses. They are also different from large scale movements of ice. Avalanches can happen in any mountain range that has an enduring snowpack. They are most frequent in winter or spring, but may occur at any time of the year. In mountainous areas, avalanches are among the most serious natural hazards to life and property, so great efforts are made in avalanche control. There are many classification systems for the different forms of avalanches. Avalanches can be described by their size, destructive potential, initiation mechanism, composition, and dynamics.

== Formation ==
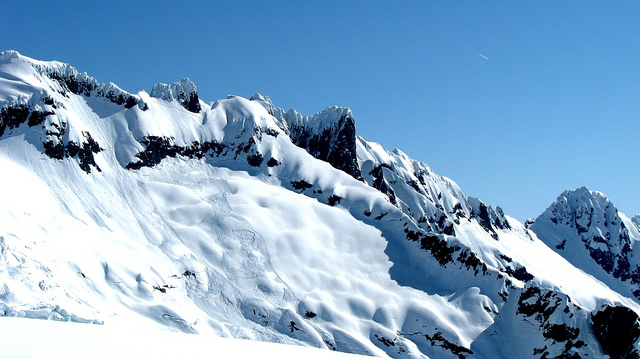
Loose snow avalanches (far left) and slab avalanches (near center) near Mount Shuksan in the North Cascades mountains. Fracture propagation is relatively limited.

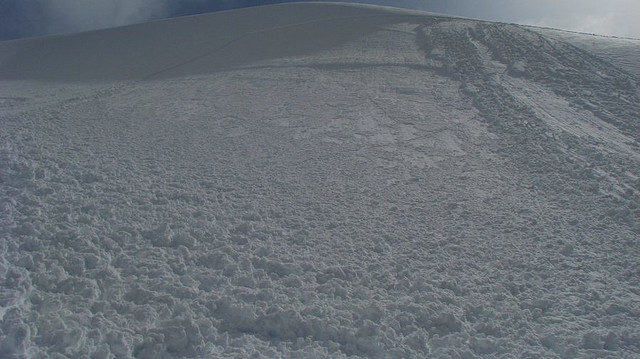
15 cm deep, soft slab avalanche triggered by a snowboarder near Heliotrope Ridge, Mount Baker in March 2010. Multiple crown fracture lines are visible in the top-middle of the image. Note the granular characteristic of the debris in the foreground that results from the slab breaking up during descent.

Most avalanches occur spontaneously during storms under increased load due to snowfall and/or erosion. Metamorphic changes in the snowpack, such as melting due to solar radiation, is the second-largest cause of natural avalanches. Other natural causes include rain, earthquakes, rockfall, and icefall. Artificial triggers of avalanches include skiers, snowmobiles, and controlled explosive work. Contrary to popular belief, avalanches are not triggered by loud sound; the pressure from sound is orders of magnitude too small to trigger an avalanche.

Avalanche initiation can start at a point with only a small amount of snow moving initially; this is typical of wet snow avalanches or avalanches in dry unconsolidated snow. However, if the snow has sintered into a stiff slab overlying a weak layer, then fractures can propagate very rapidly, so that a large volume of snow, possibly thousands of cubic metres, can start moving almost simultaneously.

A snowpack will fail when the load exceeds the strength. The load is straightforward; it is the weight of the snow. However, the strength of the snowpack is much more difficult to determine and is extremely heterogeneous. It varies in detail with properties of the snow grains, size, density, morphology, temperature, water content; and the properties of the bonds between the grains. These properties may all metamorphose in time according to the local humidity, water vapour flux, temperature and heat flux. The top of the snowpack is also extensively influenced by incoming radiation and the local air flow. One of the aims of avalanche research is to develop and validate computer models that can describe the evolution of the seasonal snowpack over time. A complicating factor is the complex interaction of terrain and weather, which causes significant spatial and temporal variability of the depths, crystal forms, and layering of the seasonal snowpack.

=== Slab avalanches ===
Slab avalanches are formed frequently in snow that has been deposited, or redeposited by wind. They have the characteristic appearance of a block (slab) of snow cut out from its surroundings by fractures. Elements of slab avalanches include a crown fracture at the top of the start zone, flank fractures on the sides of the start zones, and a fracture at the bottom called the stauchwall. The crown and flank fractures are vertical walls in the snow delineating the snow that was entrained in the avalanche from the snow that remained on the slope. Slabs can vary in thickness from a few centimetres to three metres. Slab avalanches account for around 90% of avalanche-related fatalities.

=== Powder snow avalanches ===
The largest avalanches form turbulent suspension currents known as powder snow avalanches or mixed avalanches, a kind of gravity current. These consist of a powder cloud, which overlies a dense avalanche. They can form from any type of snow or initiation mechanism, but usually occur with fresh dry powder. They can exceed speeds of 300 km/h (190 mph), and masses of 1,000,000 tons; their flows can travel long distances along flat valley bottoms and even uphill for short distances.

=== Wet snow avalanches ===
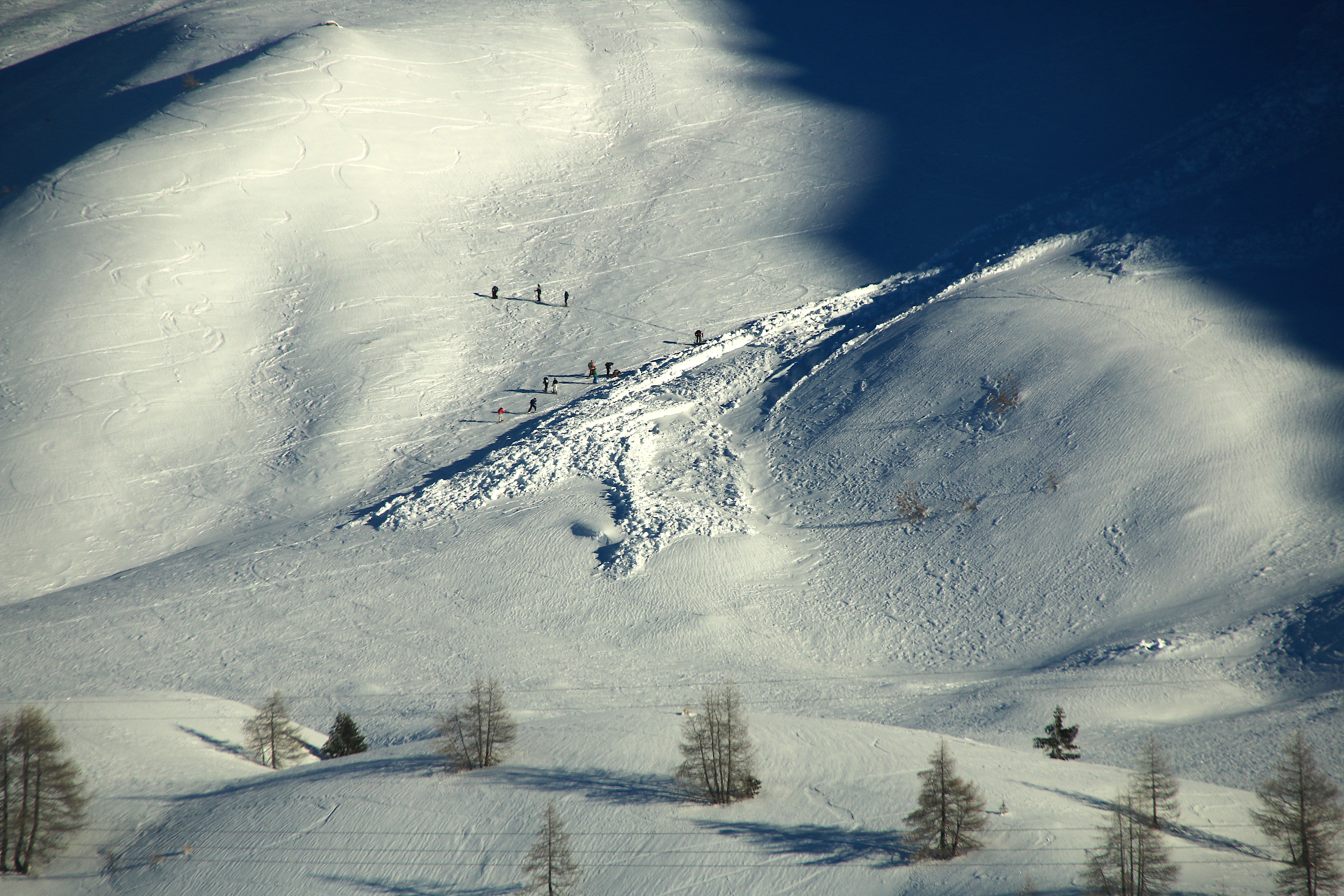
Avalanche on Simplon Pass (2019)

In contrast to powder snow avalanches, wet snow avalanches are a low velocity suspension of snow and water, with the flow confined to the track surface (McClung, 1999, p. 108). The low speed of travel is due to the friction between the sliding surface of the track and the water saturated flow. Despite the low speed of travel (≈10–40 km/h), wet snow avalanches are capable of generating powerful destructive forces, due to the large mass and density. The body of the flow of a wet snow avalanche can plough through soft snow, and can scour boulders, earth, trees, and other vegetation; leaving exposed and often scored ground in the avalanche track. Wet snow avalanches can be initiated from either loose snow releases, or slab releases, and only occur in snowpacks that are water saturated and isothermally equilibrated to the melting point of water. The isothermal characteristic of wet snow avalanches has led to the secondary term of isothermal slides found in the literature (for example in Daffern, 1999, p. 93). At temperate latitudes wet snow avalanches are frequently associated with climatic avalanche cycles at the end of the winter season, when there is significant daytime warming.

=== Ice avalanche ===
An ice avalanche occurs when a large piece of ice, such as from a serac or calving glacier, falls onto ice (such as the Khumbu Icefall), triggering a movement of broken ice chunks. The resulting movement is more analogous to a rockfall or a landslide than a snow avalanche. They are typically very difficult to predict and almost impossible to mitigate.

=== Avalanche pathway ===
As an avalanche moves down a slope it follows a certain pathway that is dependent on the slope's degree of steepness and the volume of snow/ice involved in the mass movement. The origin of an avalanche is called the Starting Point and typically occurs on a 30–45 degree slope. The body of the pathway is called the Track of the avalanche and usually occurs on a 20–30 degree slope. When the avalanche loses its momentum and eventually stops it reaches the Runout Zone. This usually occurs when the slope has reached a steepness that is less than 20 degrees. These degrees are not consistently true due to the fact that each avalanche is unique depending on the stability of the snowpack that it was derived from as well as the environmental or human influences that triggered the mass movement.

== Injuries and deaths ==
People caught in avalanches can die from suffocation, trauma, or hypothermia. From "1950–1951 to 2020–2021" there were 1,169 people who died in avalanches in the United States. For the 11-year period ending April 2006, 445 people died in avalanches throughout North America. On average, 28 people die in avalanches every winter in the United States. In 2001 it was reported that globally an average of 150 people die each year from avalanches.

== Terrain, snowpack, weather ==
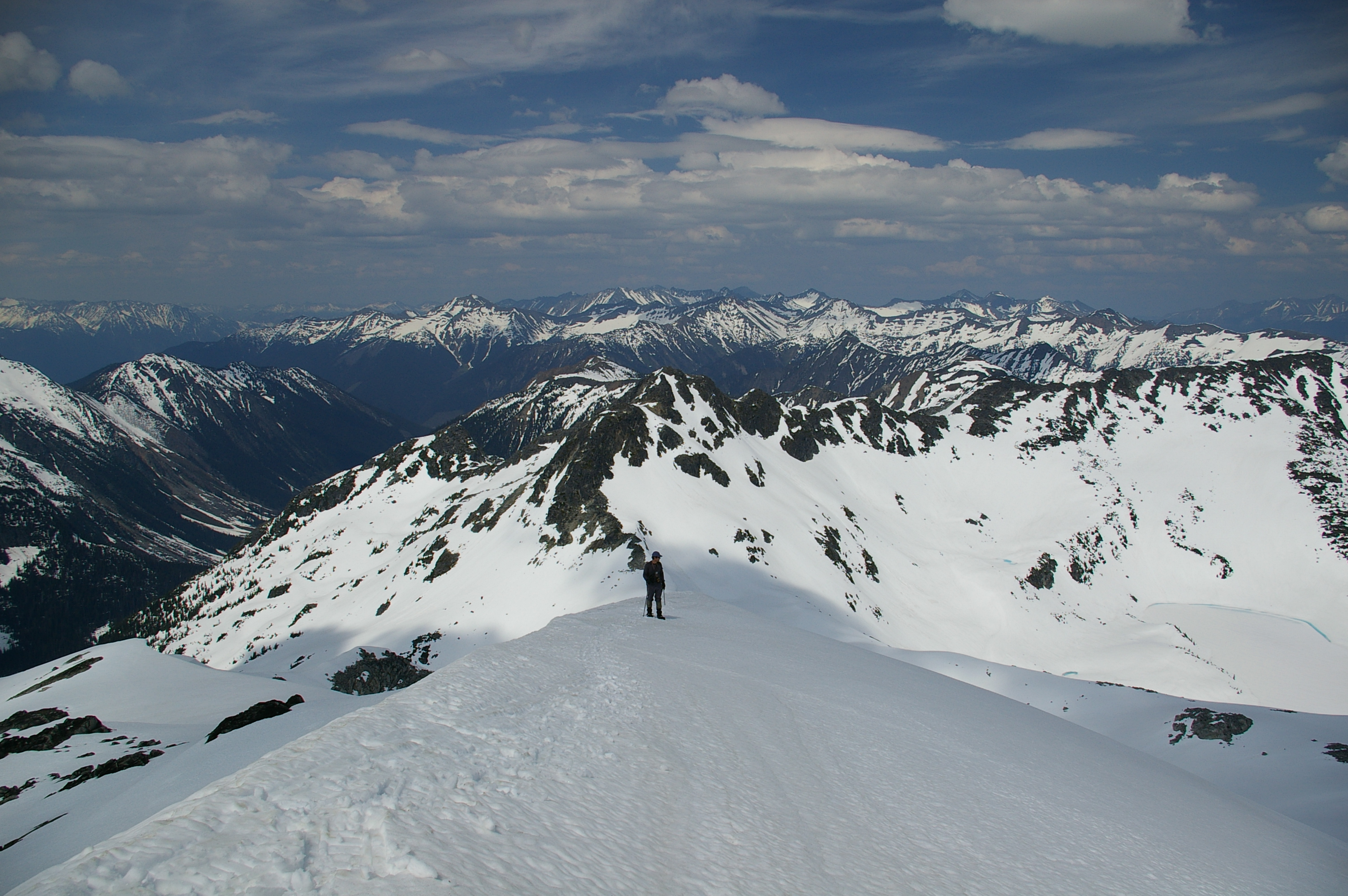
In steep avalanche-prone terrain, traveling on ridges is generally safer than traversing the slopes.

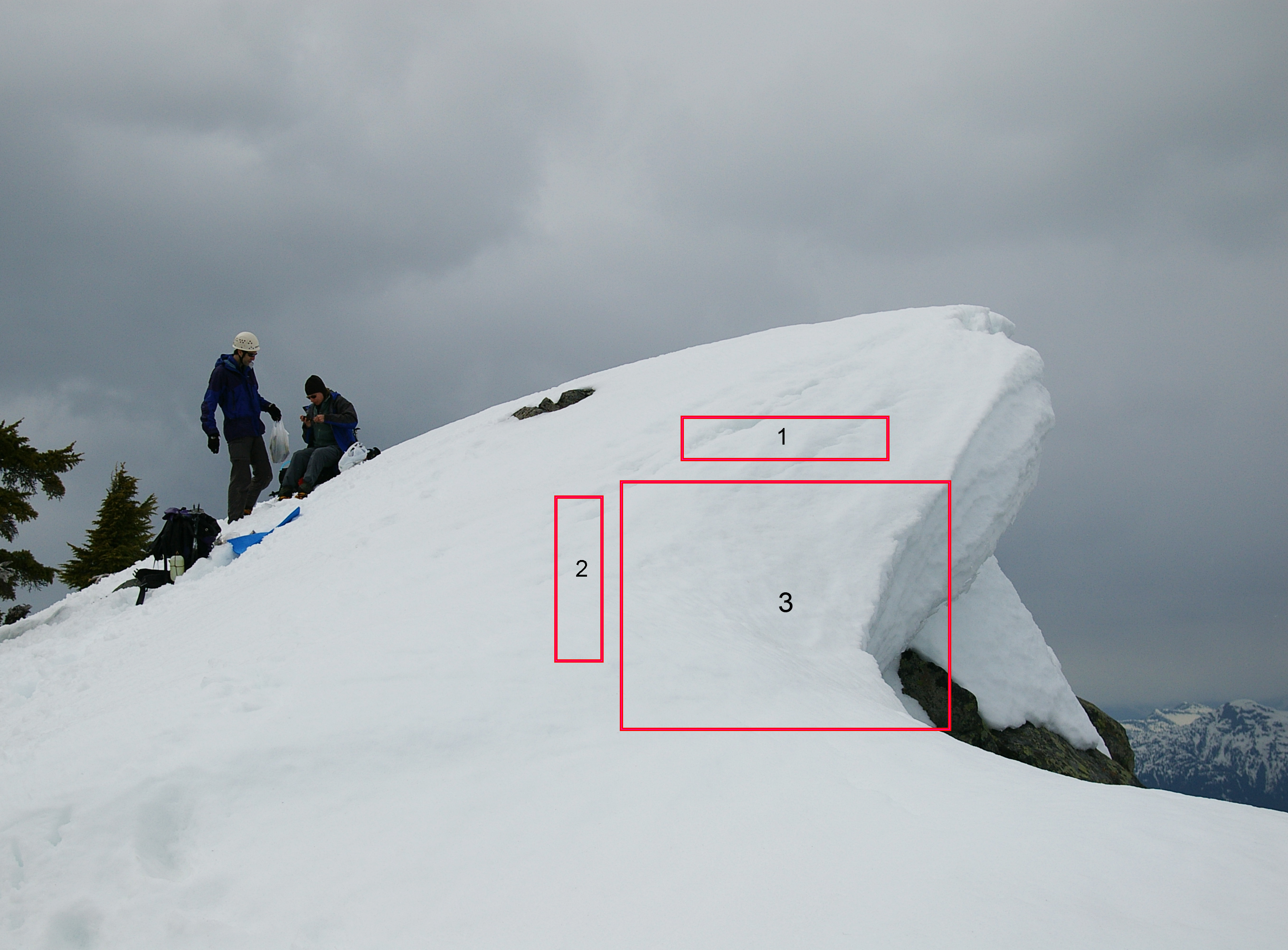
A cornice of snow about to fall. Cracks in the snow are visible in area (1). Area (3) fell soon after this picture was taken, leaving area (2) as the new edge.

Doug Fesler and Jill Fredston developed a conceptual model of the three primary elements of avalanches: terrain, weather, and snowpack. Terrain describes the places where avalanches occur, weather describes the meteorological conditions that create the snowpack, and snowpack describes the structural characteristics of snow that make avalanche formation possible.

=== Terrain ===
Avalanche formation requires a slope shallow enough for snow to accumulate but steep enough for the snow to accelerate once set in motion by the combination of mechanical failure (of the snowpack) and gravity. The angle of the slope that can hold snow, called the angle of repose, depends on a variety of factors, such as crystal form and moisture content. Some forms of drier and colder snow will only stick to shallower slopes, while wet and warm snow can bond to very steep surfaces. In coastal mountains, such as the Cordillera del Paine region of Patagonia, deep snowpacks collect on vertical and even overhanging rock faces. The slope angle that can allow moving snow to accelerate depends on a variety of factors such as the snow's shear strength (which is itself dependent upon crystal form) and the configuration of layers and inter-layer interfaces.

The snowpack on slopes with sunny exposures is strongly influenced by sunshine. Diurnal cycles of thawing and refreezing can stabilize the snowpack by promoting settlement. Strong freeze-thaw cycles result in the formation of surface crusts during the night and of unstable surface snow during the day. Slopes in the lee of a ridge or of another wind obstacle accumulate more snow and are more likely to include pockets of deep snow, wind slabs, and cornices, all of which, when disturbed, may result in avalanche formation. Conversely, the snowpack on a windward slope is often much shallower than on a lee slope.

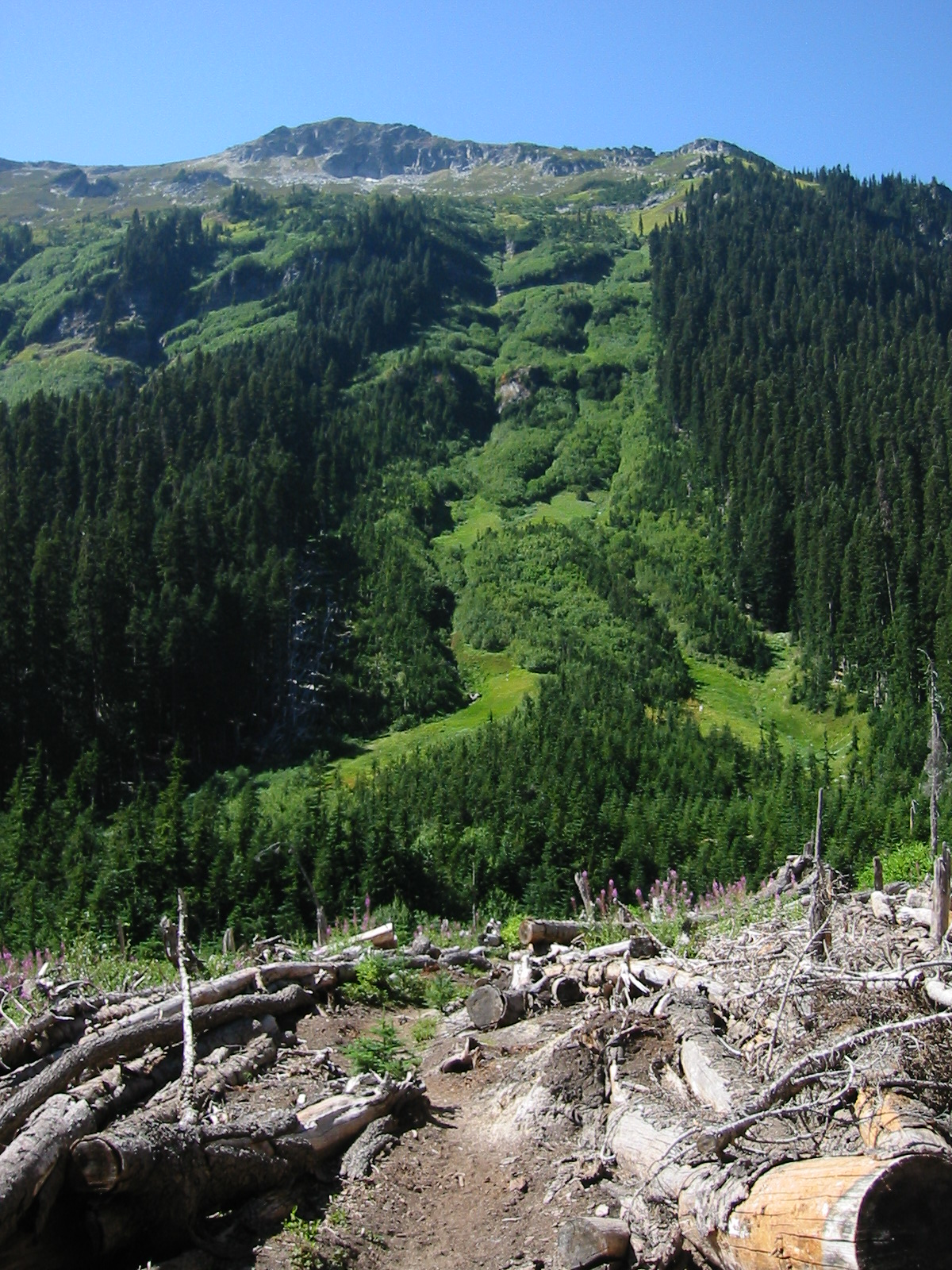
Avalanche path with 800 metres (2,600 ft) vertical fall in the Glacier Peak Wilderness, Washington state. Avalanche paths in alpine terrain may be poorly defined because of limited vegetation. Below tree line, avalanche paths are often delineated by vegetative trim lines created by past avalanches. The start zone is visible near the top of the image, the track is in the middle of the image and clearly denoted by vegetative trimlines, and the runout zone is shown at the bottom of the image. One possible timeline is as follows: an avalanche forms in the start zone near the ridge, and then descends the track, until coming to rest in the runout zone.

Avalanches and avalanche paths share common elements: a start zone where the avalanche originates, a track along which the avalanche flows, and a runout zone where the avalanche comes to rest. The debris deposit is the accumulated mass of the avalanched snow once it has come to rest in the run-out zone. For the image at left, many small avalanches form in this avalanche path every year, but most of these avalanches do not run the full vertical or horizontal length of the path. The frequency with which avalanches form in a given area is known as the return period.

The start zone of an avalanche must be steep enough to allow snow to accelerate once set in motion, additionally convex slopes are less stable than concave slopes because of the disparity between the tensile strength of snow layers and their compressive strength. The composition and structure of the ground surface beneath the snowpack influences the stability of the snowpack, either being a source of strength or weakness. Avalanches are unlikely to form in very thick forests, but boulders and sparsely distributed vegetation can create weak areas deep within the snowpack through the formation of strong temperature gradients. Full-depth avalanches (avalanches that sweep a slope virtually clean of snow cover) are more common on slopes with smooth ground, such as grass or rock slabs.

Generally speaking, avalanches follow drainages down-slope, frequently sharing drainage features with summertime watersheds. At and below tree line, avalanche paths through drainages are well defined by vegetation boundaries called trim lines, which occur where avalanches have removed trees and prevented regrowth of large vegetation. Engineered drainages, such as the avalanche dam on Mount Stephen in Kicking Horse Pass, have been constructed to protect people and property by redirecting the flow of avalanches. Deep debris deposits from avalanches will collect in catchments at the terminus of a run out, such as gullies and river beds.

Slopes flatter than 25 degrees or steeper than 60 degrees typically have a lower incidence of avalanches. Human-triggered avalanches have the greatest incidence when the snow's angle of repose is between 35 and 45 degrees; the critical angle, the angle at which human-triggered avalanches are most frequent, is 38 degrees. When the incidence of human triggered avalanches is normalized by the rates of recreational use, however, hazard increases uniformly with slope angle, and no significant difference in hazard for a given exposure direction can be found. The rule of thumb is: A slope that is flat enough to hold snow but steep enough to ski has the potential to generate an avalanche, regardless of the angle.

=== Snowpack structure and characteristics ===
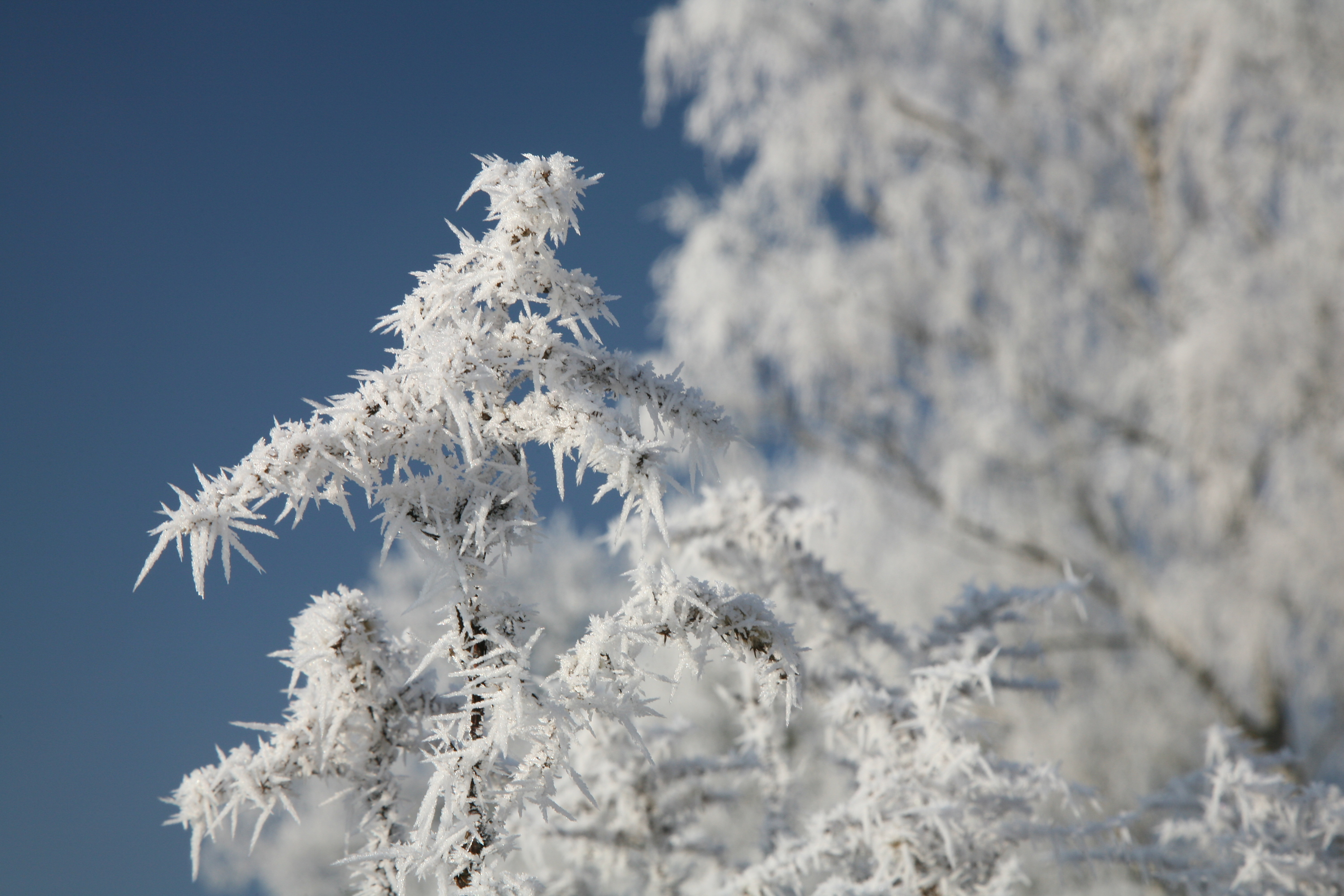
After surface hoarfrost becomes buried by later snowfall, the buried hoar layer can be a weak layer upon which upper layers can slide.

The snowpack is composed of ground-parallel layers that accumulate over the winter. Each layer contains ice grains that are representative of the distinct meteorological conditions during which the snow formed and was deposited. Once deposited, a snow layer continues to evolve under the influence of the meteorological conditions that prevail after deposition.

For an avalanche to occur, it is necessary that a snowpack have a weak layer (or instability) below a slab of cohesive snow. In practice the formal mechanical and structural factors related to snowpack instability are not directly observable outside of laboratories, thus the more easily observed properties of the snow layers (e.g. penetration resistance, grain size, grain type, temperature) are used as index measurements of the mechanical properties of the snow (e.g. tensile strength, friction coefficients, shear strength, and ductile strength). This results in two principal sources of uncertainty in determining snowpack stability based on snow structure: First, both the factors influencing snow stability and the specific characteristics of the snowpack vary widely within small areas and time scales, resulting in significant difficulty extrapolating point observations of snow layers across different scales of space and time. Second, the relationship between readily observable snowpack characteristics and the snowpack's critical mechanical properties has not been completely developed.

While the deterministic relationship between snowpack characteristics and snowpack stability is still a matter of ongoing scientific study, there is a growing empirical understanding of the snow composition and deposition characteristics that influence the likelihood of an avalanche. Observation and experience has shown that newly fallen snow requires time to bond with the snow layers beneath it, especially if the new snow falls during very cold and dry conditions. If ambient air temperatures are cold enough, shallow snow above or around boulders, plants, and other discontinuities in the slope, weakens from rapid crystal growth that occurs in the presence of a critical temperature gradient. Large, angular snow crystals are indicators of weak snow, because such crystals have fewer bonds per unit volume than small, rounded crystals that pack tightly together. Consolidated snow is less likely to slough than loose powdery layers or wet isothermal snow; however, consolidated snow is a necessary condition for the occurrence of slab avalanches, and persistent instabilities within the snowpack can hide below well-consolidated surface layers. Uncertainty associated with the empirical understanding of the factors influencing snow stability leads most professional avalanche workers to recommend conservative use of avalanche terrain relative to current snowpack instability.

=== Weather ===
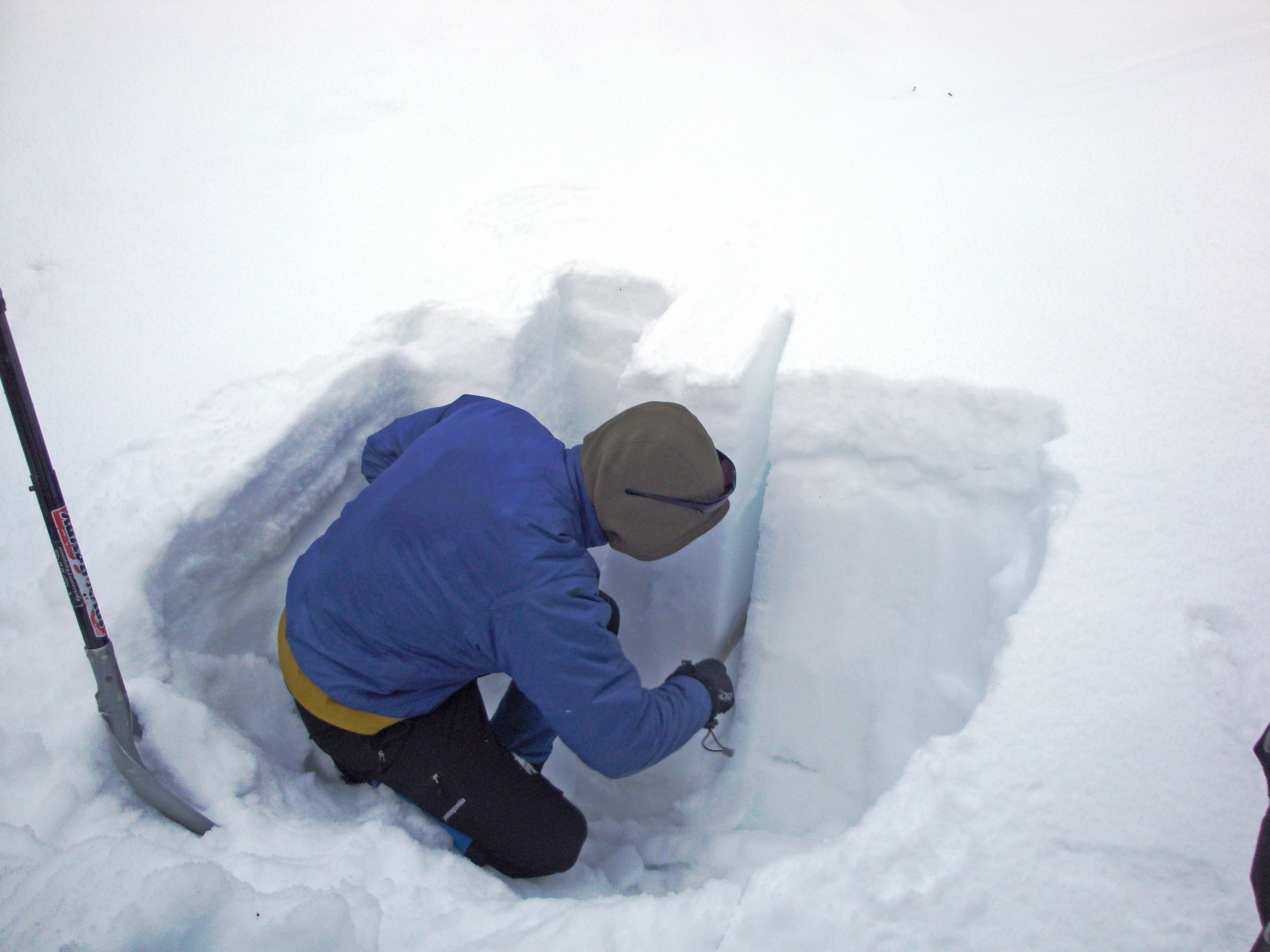
After digging a snow pit, it is possible to evaluate the snowpack for unstable layers. In this picture, snow from a weak layer has been easily scraped away by hand, leaving a horizontal line in the wall of the pit.

Avalanches only occur in a standing snowpack. Typically winter seasons at high latitudes, high altitudes, or both have weather that is sufficiently unsettled and cold enough for precipitated snow to accumulate into a seasonal snowpack. Continentality, through its potentiating influence on the meteorological extremes experienced by snowpacks, is an important factor in the evolution of instabilities, and consequential occurrence of avalanches faster stabilization of the snowpack after storm cycles. The evolution of the snowpack is critically sensitive to small variations within the narrow range of meteorological conditions that allow for the accumulation of snow into a snowpack. Among the critical factors controlling snowpack evolution are: heating by the sun, radiational cooling, vertical temperature gradients in standing snow, snowfall amounts, and snow types. Generally, mild winter weather will promote the settlement and stabilization of the snowpack; conversely, very cold, windy, or hot weather will weaken the snowpack.

At temperatures close to the freezing point of water, or during times of moderate solar radiation, a gentle freeze-thaw cycle will take place. The melting and refreezing of water in the snow strengthens the snowpack during the freezing phase and weakens it during the thawing phase. A rapid rise in temperature, to a point significantly above the freezing point of water, may cause avalanche formation at any time of year.

Persistent cold temperatures can either prevent new snow from stabilizing or destabilize the existing snowpack. Cold air temperatures on the snow surface produce a temperature gradient in the snow, because the ground temperature at the base of the snowpack is usually around 0 °C, and the ambient air temperature can be much colder. When a temperature gradient greater than 10 °C change per vertical meter of snow is sustained for more than a day, angular crystals called depth hoar or facets begin forming in the snowpack because of rapid moisture transport along the temperature gradient. These angular crystals, which bond poorly to one another and the surrounding snow, often become a persistent weakness in the snowpack. When a slab lying on top of a persistent weakness is loaded by a force greater than the strength of the slab and persistent weak layer, the persistent weak layer can fail and generate an avalanche.

Any wind stronger than a light breeze can contribute to a rapid accumulation of snow on sheltered slopes downwind. Wind slabs form quickly and, if present, weaker snow below the slab may not have time to adjust to the new load. Even on a clear day, wind can quickly load a slope with snow by blowing snow from one place to another. Top-loading occurs when wind deposits snow from the top of a slope; cross-loading occurs when wind deposits snow parallel to the slope. When a wind blows over the top of a mountain, the leeward, or downwind, side of the mountain experiences top-loading, from the top to the bottom of that lee slope. When the wind blows across a ridge that leads up the mountain, the leeward side of the ridge is subject to cross-loading. Cross-loaded wind-slabs are usually difficult to identify visually.

Snowstorms and rainstorms are important contributors to avalanche danger. Heavy snowfall will cause instability in the existing snowpack, both because of the additional weight and because the new snow has insufficient time to bond to underlying snow layers. Rain has a similar effect. In the short term, rain causes instability because, like a heavy snowfall, it imposes an additional load on the snowpack and once rainwater seeps down through the snow, acts as a lubricant, reducing the natural friction between snow layers that holds the snowpack together. Most avalanches happen during or soon after a storm.

Daytime exposure to sunlight will rapidly destabilize the upper layers of the snowpack if the sunlight is strong enough to melt the snow, thereby reducing its hardness. During clear nights, the snowpack can re-freeze when ambient air temperatures fall below freezing, through the process of long-wave radiative cooling, or both. Radiative heat loss occurs when the night air is significantly cooler than the snowpack, and the heat stored in the snow is re-radiated into the atmosphere.

== Dynamics ==
When a slab avalanche forms, the slab disintegrates into increasingly smaller fragments as the snow travels downhill. If the fragments become small enough the outer layer of the avalanche, called a saltation layer, takes on the characteristics of a fluid. When sufficiently fine particles are present they can become airborne and, given a sufficient quantity of airborne snow, this portion of the avalanche can become separated from the bulk of the avalanche and travel a greater distance as a powder snow avalanche. Scientific studies using radar, following the 1999 Galtür avalanche disaster, confirmed the hypothesis that a saltation layer forms between the surface and the airborne components of an avalanche, which can also separate from the bulk of the avalanche.

Driving an avalanche is the component of the avalanche's weight parallel to the slope; as the avalanche progresses any unstable snow in its path will tend to become incorporated, so increasing the overall weight. This force will increase as the steepness of the slope increases, and diminish as the slope flattens. Resisting this are a number of components that are thought to interact with each other: the friction between the avalanche and the surface beneath; friction between the air and snow within the fluid; fluid-dynamic drag at the leading edge of the avalanche; shear resistance between the avalanche and the air through which it is passing, and shear resistance between the fragments within the avalanche itself. An avalanche will continue to accelerate until the resistance exceeds the forward force.

=== Modeling ===
Attempts to model avalanche behaviour date from the early 20th century, notably the work of Professor Lagotala in preparation for the 1924 Winter Olympics in Chamonix. His method was developed by A. Voellmy and popularised following the publication in 1955 of his Ueber die Zerstörungskraft von Lawinen (On the Destructive Force of Avalanches).

Voellmy used a simple empirical formula, treating an avalanche as a sliding block of snow moving with a drag force that was proportional to the square of the speed of its flow:

$$\textrm{Pref} = \frac {1} {2} \, { \rho} \, { v^2} \,\!$$

He and others subsequently derived other formulae that take other factors into account, with the Voellmy-Salm-Gubler and the Perla-Cheng-McClung models becoming most widely used as simple tools to model flowing (as opposed to powder snow) avalanches.

Since the 1990s many more sophisticated models have been developed. In Europe much of the recent work was carried out as part of the SATSIE (Avalanche Studies and Model Validation in Europe) research project supported by the European Commission which produced the leading-edge MN2L model, now in use with the Service Restauration des Terrains en Montagne (Mountain Rescue Service) in France, and D2FRAM (Dynamical Two-Flow-Regime Avalanche Model), which was still undergoing validation as of 2007. Other known models are the SAMOS-AT avalanche simulation software and the RAMMS software.

== Human involvement ==
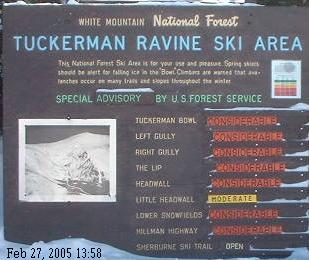
United States Forest Service avalanche danger advisories.

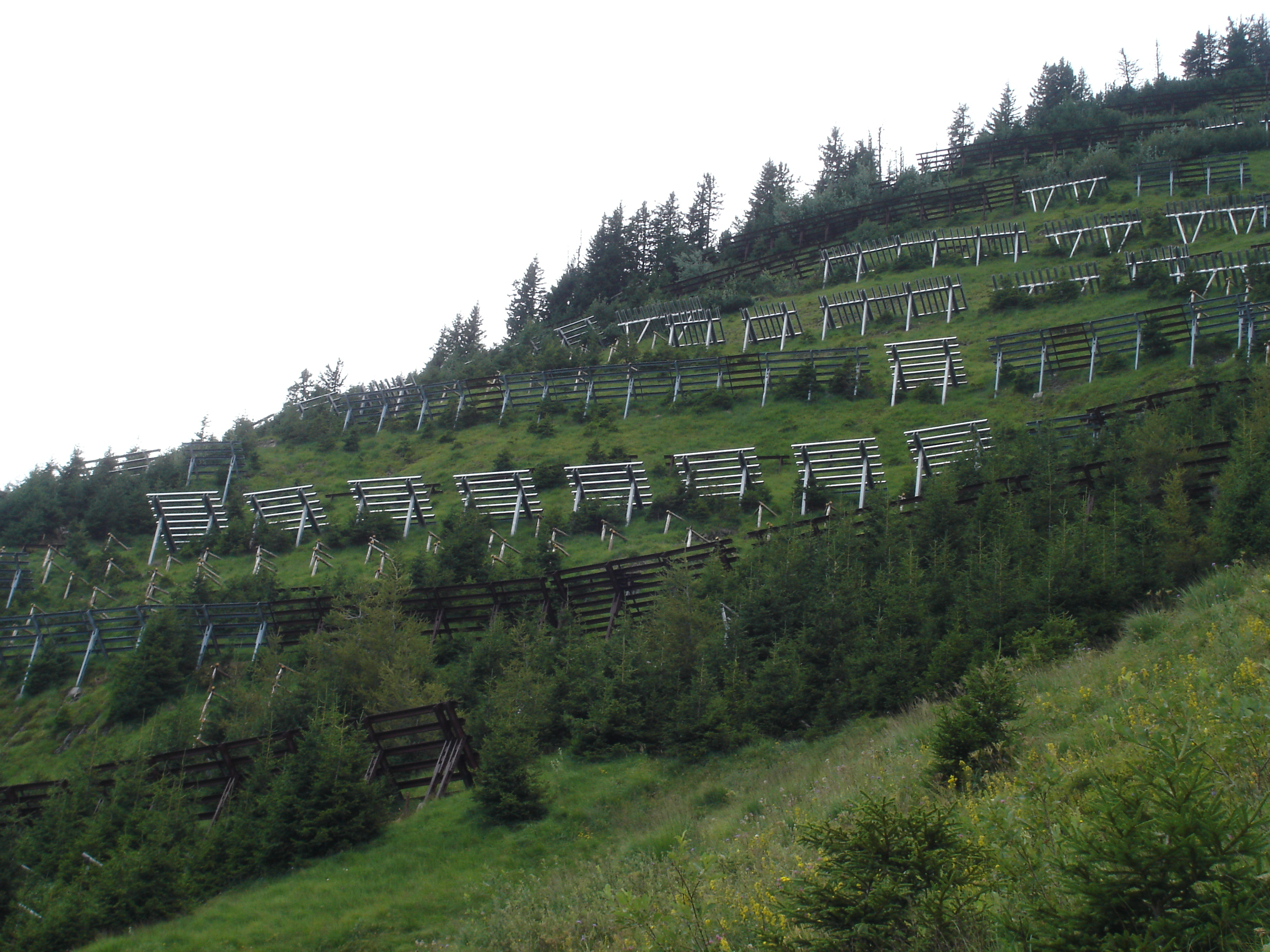
Snow fences in Switzerland during summer.

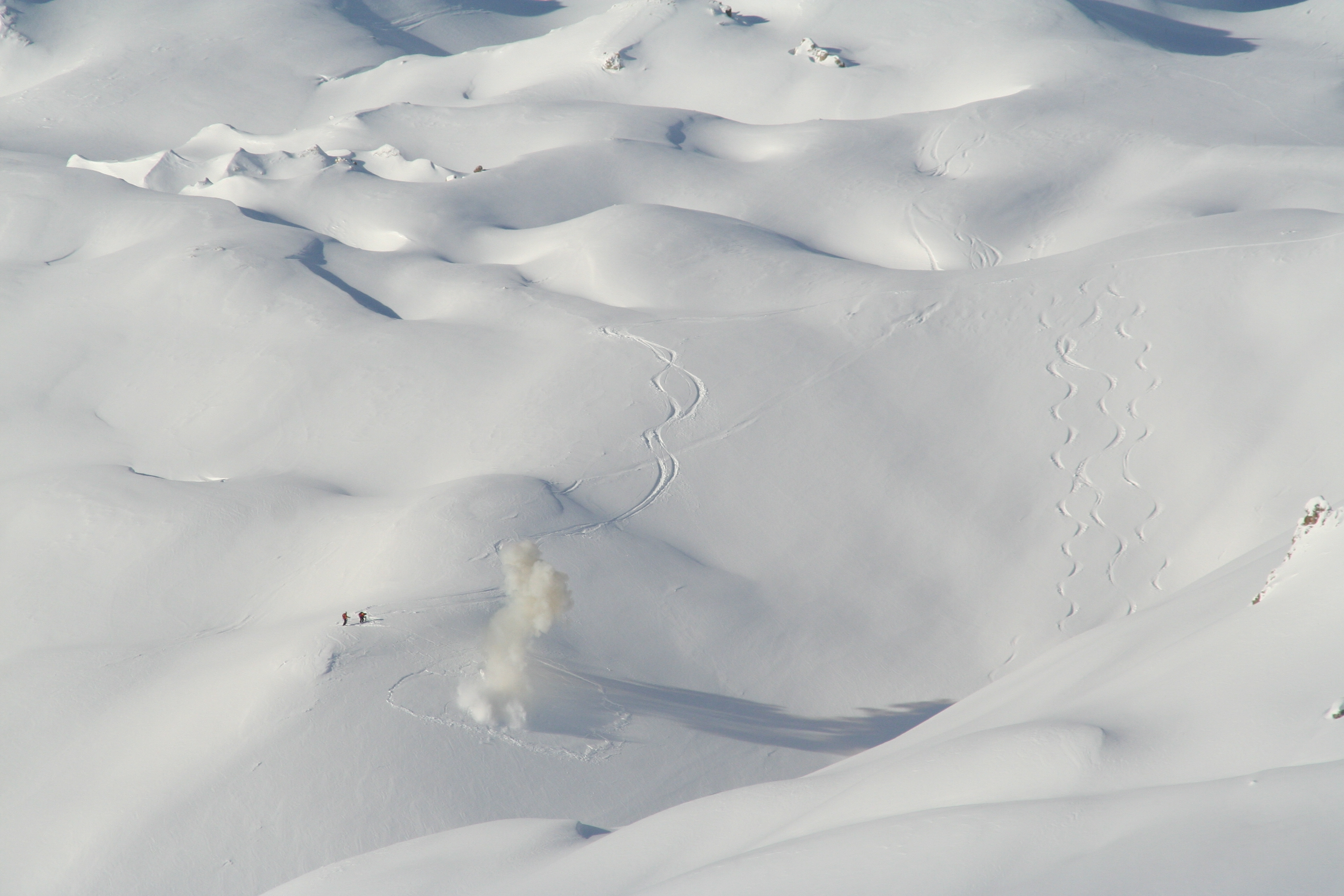
Avalanche blasting in French ski resort Tignes (3,600 m)

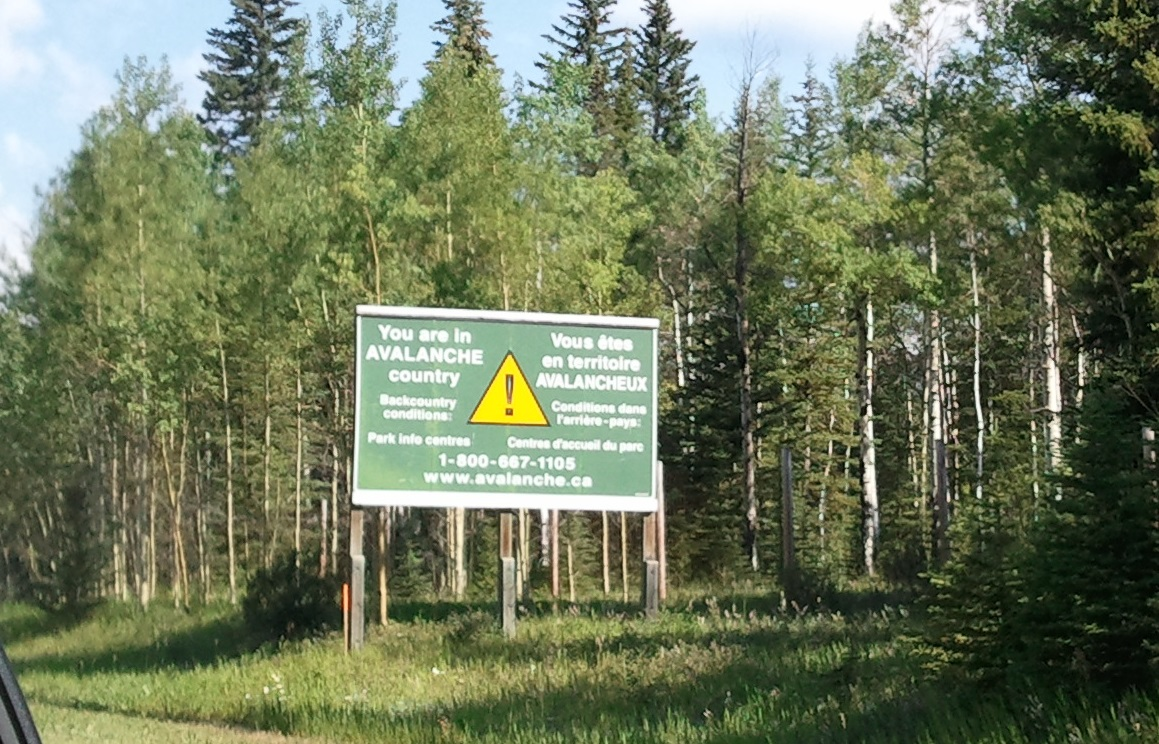
Avalanche warning sign near Banff, Alberta

=== Prevention ===
Preventative measures are employed in areas where avalanches pose a significant threat to people, such as ski resorts, mountain towns, roads, and railways. There are several ways to prevent avalanches and lessen their power and develop preventative measures to reduce the likelihood and size of avalanches by disrupting the structure of the snowpack, while passive measures reinforce and stabilize the snowpack in situ. The simplest active measure is repeatedly traveling on a snowpack as snow accumulates; this can be by means of boot-packing, ski-cutting, or machine grooming. Explosives are used extensively to prevent avalanches, by triggering smaller avalanches that break down instabilities in the snowpack, and removing overburden that can result in larger avalanches. Explosive charges are delivered by a number of methods including hand-tossed charges, helicopter-dropped bombs, Gazex concussion lines, and ballistic projectiles launched by air cannons and artillery. Passive preventive systems such as snow fences and light walls can be used to direct the placement of snow. Snow builds up around the fence, especially the side that faces the prevailing winds. Downwind of the fence, snow build-up is lessened. This is caused by the loss of snow at the fence that would have been deposited and the pickup of the snow that is already there by the wind, which was depleted of snow at the fence. When there is a sufficient density of trees, they can greatly reduce the strength of avalanches. They hold snow in place and when there is an avalanche, the impact of the snow against the trees slows it down. Trees can either be planted or they can be conserved, such as in the building of a ski resort, to reduce the strength of avalanches.

In turn, socio-environmental changes can influence the occurrence of damaging avalanches: some studies linking changes in land-use/land-cover patterns and the evolution of snow avalanche damage in mid latitude mountains show the importance of the role played by vegetation cover, that is at the root of the increase of damage when the protective forest is deforested (because of demographic growth, intensive grazing and industrial or legal causes), and at the root of the decrease of damage because of the transformation of a traditional land-management system based on overexploitation into a system based on land marginalization and reforestation, something that has happened mainly since the mid-20th century in mountain environments of developed countries.

=== Mitigation ===
In many areas, regular avalanche tracks can be identified and precautions can be taken to minimize damage, such as the prevention of development in these areas. To mitigate the effect of avalanches the construction of artificial barriers can be very effective in reducing avalanche damage. There are several types: One kind of barrier (snow net) uses a net strung between poles that are anchored by guy wires in addition to their foundations. These barriers are similar to those used for rockslides. Another type of barrier is a rigid fence-like structure (snow fence) and may be constructed of steel, wood or pre-stressed concrete. They usually have gaps between the beams and are built perpendicular to the slope, with reinforcing beams on the downhill side. Rigid barriers are often considered unsightly, especially when many rows must be built. They are also expensive and vulnerable to damage from falling rocks in the warmer months. In addition to industrially manufactured barriers, landscaped barriers, called avalanche dams stop or deflect avalanches with their weight and strength. These barriers are made out of concrete, rocks, or earth. They are usually placed right above the structure, road, or railway that they are trying to protect, although they can also be used to channel avalanches into other barriers. Occasionally, earth mounds are placed in the avalanche's path to slow it down. Finally, along transportation corridors, large shelters, called snow sheds, can be built directly in the slide path of an avalanche to protect traffic from avalanches.

=== Early warning systems ===
Warning systems can detect avalanches which develop slowly, such as ice avalanches caused by icefalls from glaciers. Interferometric radars, high-resolution cameras, or motion sensors can monitor unstable areas over a long term, lasting from days to years. Experts interpret the recorded data and are able to recognize upcoming ruptures in order to initiate appropriate measures. Such systems (e.g. the monitoring of the Weissmies glacier in Switzerland) can recognize events several days in advance.

=== Alarm systems ===
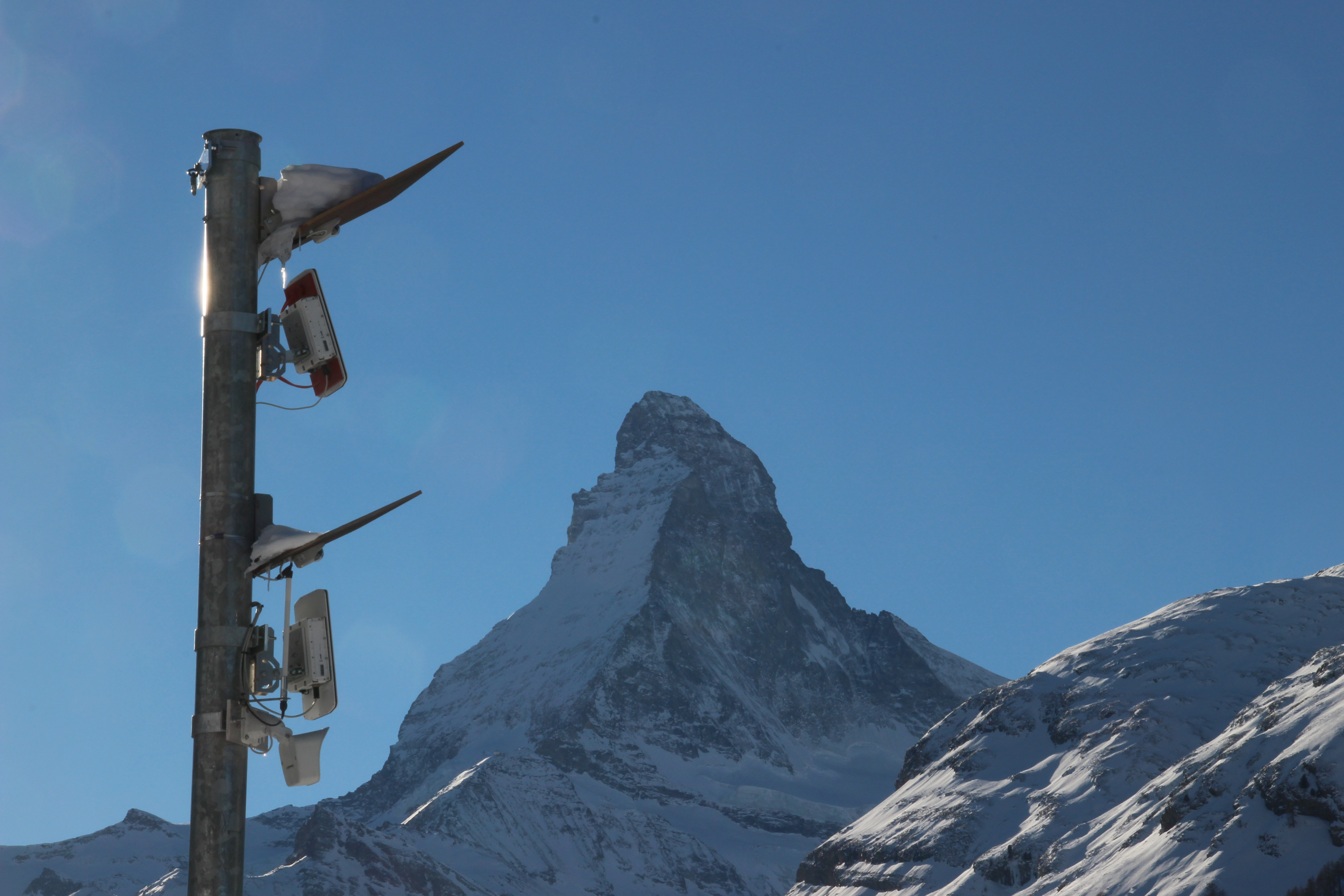
Radar station for avalanche monitoring in Zermatt.

Modern radar technology enables the monitoring of large areas and the localization of avalanches at any weather condition, by day and by night. Complex alarm systems are able to detect avalanches within a short time in order to close (e.g. roads and rails) or evacuate (e.g. construction sites) endangered areas. An example of such a system is installed on the only access road of Zermatt in Switzerland. Two radars monitor the slope of a mountain above the road. The system automatically closes the road by activating several barriers and traffic lights within seconds such that no people are harmed.

=== Survival, rescue, and recovery ===
Avalanche accidents are broadly differentiated into 2 categories: accidents in recreational settings, and accidents in residential, industrial, and transportation settings. This distinction is motivated by the observed difference in the causes of avalanche accidents in the two settings. In the recreational setting most accidents are caused by the people involved in the avalanche. In a 1996 study, Jamieson et al. (pages 7–20) found that 83% of all avalanches in the recreational setting were caused by those who were involved in the accident. In contrast, all the accidents in the residential, industrial, and transportation settings were due to spontaneous natural avalanches. Because of the difference in the causes of avalanche accidents, and the activities pursued in the two settings, avalanche and disaster management professionals have developed two related preparedness, rescue, and recovery strategies for each of the settings.

== Notable avalanches ==
Two avalanches occurred in March 1910 in the Cascade and Selkirk Mountain ranges. On 1 March the Wellington avalanche killed 96 in Washington state, United States. Three days later 62 railroad workers were killed in the Rogers Pass avalanche in British Columbia, Canada.

During World War I, an estimated 40,000 to 80,000 soldiers died as a result of avalanches during the mountain campaign in the Alps at the Austrian-Italian front, many of which were caused by artillery fire. Some 10,000 men, from both sides, died in avalanches in December 1916.

In the Northern Hemisphere winter of 1950–1951 approximately 649 avalanches were recorded in a three-month period throughout the Alps in Austria, France, Switzerland, Italy and Germany. This series of avalanches killed around 265 people and was termed the Winter of Terror.

The avalanche in Biały Jar occurred on 20 March 1968, sweeping away 24 people who were walking along the bottom of Biały Jar ravine in the Giant Mountains. Five of them, who were thrown aside by the avalanche, would survive. The remaining 19 people – including 13 Russians, 4 citizens of East Germany, and two Polish citizens – were killed. A total of 1,100 people took part in the rescue operation.

A mountain climbing camp on Lenin Peak, in what is now Kyrgyzstan, was wiped out in 1990 when an earthquake triggered a large avalanche that overran the camp. Forty-three climbers were killed.

In 1993, the Bayburt Üzengili avalanche killed 60 individuals in Üzengili in the province of Bayburt, Turkey.

A large avalanche in Montroc, France, in 1999, 300,000 cubic metres of snow slid on a 30° slope, achieving a speed in the region of 100 km/h (62 mph). It killed 12 people in their chalets under 100,000 tons of snow, 5 meters (16 feet) deep. The mayor of Chamonix was convicted of second-degree murder for not evacuating the area, but received a suspended sentence.

The small Austrian village of Galtür was hit by the Galtür avalanche in 1999. The village was thought to be in a safe zone but the avalanche was exceptionally large and flowed into the village. Thirty-one people died.

On 28 January 2003, the Tatra Mountains avalanche swept away nine out of a thirteen-member group heading to the summit of Rysy in the Tatra Mountains. The participants of the trip were students from the I Leon Kruczkowski High School in Tychy and individuals associated with the school's sports club.

On 3 July 2022 a serac collapsed on the Marmolada Glacier, Italy, causing an avalanche that killed 11 alpinists and injured eight.

== Classification of avalanches ==
=== European avalanche risk ===
In Europe, the avalanche risk is widely rated on the following 1 to 5 scale, which was adopted in April 1993 to replace the earlier non-standard national schemes. Descriptions were last updated in May 2003 to enhance uniformity.

In France, most avalanche deaths occur at risk levels 3 and 4. In Switzerland most occur at levels 2 and 3. It is thought that this may be due to national differences of interpretation when assessing the risks.

Risk Level	Snow Stability	Icon	Avalanche Risk
1 – Low	Snow is generally very stable.		Avalanches are unlikely except when heavy loads are applied on a few extreme steep slopes. Any spontaneous avalanches will be minor sloughs. In general, safe conditions.
2 – Moderate	On some steep slopes the snow is only moderately stable. Elsewhere it is very stable.		Avalanches may be triggered when heavy loads are applied, especially on a few generally identified steep slopes. Large spontaneous avalanches are not expected.
3 – Considerable	On many steep slopes the snow is only moderately or weakly stable.		Avalanches may be triggered on many slopes even if only light loads are applied. On some slopes, medium or even fairly large spontaneous avalanches may occur.
4 – High	On most steep slopes the snow is not very stable.		Avalanches are likely to be triggered on many slopes even if only light loads are applied. In some places, many medium or sometimes large spontaneous avalanches are likely.
5 – Very High	The snow is generally unstable.		Even on gentle slopes, many large spontaneous avalanches are likely to occur.

[1] Stability:

- Generally described in more detail in the avalanche bulletin (regarding the altitude, aspect, type of terrain etc.)

[2] additional load:

- heavy: two or more skiers or boarders without spacing between them, a single hiker or climber, a grooming machine, avalanche blasting
- light: a single skier or snowboarder smoothly linking turns and without falling, a group of skiers or snowboarders with a minimum 10 m gap between each person, a single person on snowshoes

Gradient:

- gentle slopes: with an incline below about 30°
- steep slopes: with an incline over 30°
- very steep slopes: with an incline over 35°
- extremely steep slopes: extreme in terms of the incline (over 40°), the terrain profile, proximity of the ridge, smoothness of underlying ground

=== European avalanche size table ===
Avalanche size:

Size	Runout	Potential Damage	Physical Size
1 – Sluff	Small snow slide that cannot bury a person, though there is a danger of falling.	Unlikely, but possible risk of injury or death to people.	length <50 m volume <100 m^{3}
2 – Small	Stops within the slope.	Could bury, injure or kill a person.	length <100 m volume <1,000 m^{3}
3 – Medium	Runs to the bottom of the slope.	Could bury and destroy a car, damage a truck, destroy small buildings or break trees.	length <1,000 m volume <10,000 m^{3}
4 – Large	Runs over flat areas (significantly less than 30°) of at least 50 m in length, may reach the valley bottom.	Could bury and destroy large trucks and trains, large buildings and forested areas.	length >1,000 m volume >10,000 m^{3}

=== North American Avalanche Danger Scale ===
In the United States and Canada, the following avalanche danger scale is used. Descriptors vary depending on country.

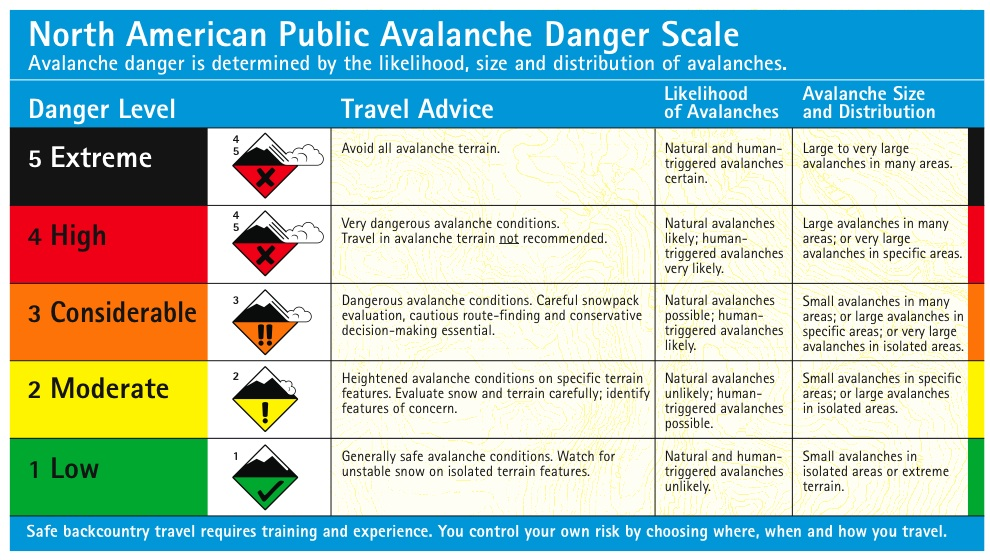
Danger Scale – English

=== Avalanche problems ===
There are nine different types of avalanche problems:

- Storm slab
- Wind slab
- Wet slab avalanches
- Persistent slab
- Deep persistent slab
- Loose dry avalanches
- Loose wet avalanches
- Glide avalanches
- Cornice fall

=== Canadian classification for avalanche size ===
The Canadian classification for avalanche size is based upon the consequences of the avalanche. Half sizes are commonly used.

Size	Destructive Potential
1	Relatively harmless to people.
2	Could bury, injure or kill a person.
3	Could bury and destroy a car, damage a truck, destroy a small building or break a few trees.
4	Could destroy a railway car, large truck, several buildings or a forest area up to 4 hectares.
5	Largest snow avalanche known. Could destroy a village or a forest of 40 hectares.

=== United States classification for avalanche size ===
The size of avalanches are classified using two scales; size relative to destructive force or D-scale and size relative to the avalanche path or R-scale. Both size scales range from 1 to 5. With the D-scale, half sizes can be used.

Size Relative to Path
R1~Very small, relative to the path.
R2~Small, relative to the path
R3~Medium, relative to the path
R4~Large, relative to the path
R5~Major or maximum, relative to the path

Size – Destructive Force
code		mass	length
D1	Relatively harmless to people	<10 t	10 m
D2	Could bury, injure, or kill a person	10^{2} t	100 m
D3	Could bury and destroy a car, damage a truck, destroy a wood-frame house, or break a few trees	10^{3} t	1000 m
D4	Could destroy a railway car, large truck, several buildings, or substantial amount of forest	10^{4} t	2000 m
D5	Could gouge the landscape. Largest snow avalanche known	10^{5} t	3000 m

=== Rutschblock Test ===
Slab avalanche hazard analysis can be done using the Rutschblock Test. A 2 m wide block of snow is isolated from the rest of the slope and progressively loaded. The result is a rating of slope stability on a seven step scale. (Rutsch means slide in German.)

== Avalanches and climate change ==
Avalanche formation and frequency is highly affected by weather patterns and the local climate. Snowpack layers will form differently depending on whether snow is falling in very cold or very warm conditions, and very dry or very humid conditions. Thus, climate change may affect when, where, and how often avalanches occur, and may also change the type of avalanches that are occurring.

=== Impacts on avalanche type and frequency ===
Overall, a rising seasonal snow line and a decrease in the number of days with snow cover are predicted. Climate change-caused temperature increases and changes in precipitation patterns will likely differ between the different mountain regions, and the impacts of these changes on avalanches will change at different elevations. In the long term, avalanche frequency at lower elevations is expected to decline corresponding to a decrease in snow cover and depth, and a short-term increase in the number of wet avalanches are predicted.

Precipitation is expected to increase, meaning more snow or rain depending on the elevation. Higher elevations predicted to remain above the seasonal snow line will likely see an increase in avalanche activity due to the increases in precipitation during the winter season. Storm precipitation intensity is also expected to increase, which is likely to lead to more days with enough snowfall to cause the snowpack to become unstable. Moderate and high elevations may see an increase in volatile swings from one weather extreme to the other. Predictions also show an increase in the number of rain on snow events, and wet avalanche cycles occurring earlier in the spring during the remainder of this century.

=== Impacts on burial survival rate ===
The warm, wet snowpacks that are likely to increase in frequency due to climate change may also make avalanche burials more deadly. Warm snow has a higher moisture content and is therefore denser than colder snow. Denser avalanche debris decreases the ability for a buried person to breathe and the amount of time they have before they run out of oxygen. This increases the likelihood of death by asphyxia in the event of a burial. Additionally, the predicted thinner snowpacks may increase the frequency of injuries due to trauma, such as a buried skier striking a rock or tree.

== Avalanches of dust on Mars ==
Avalanches on Mars

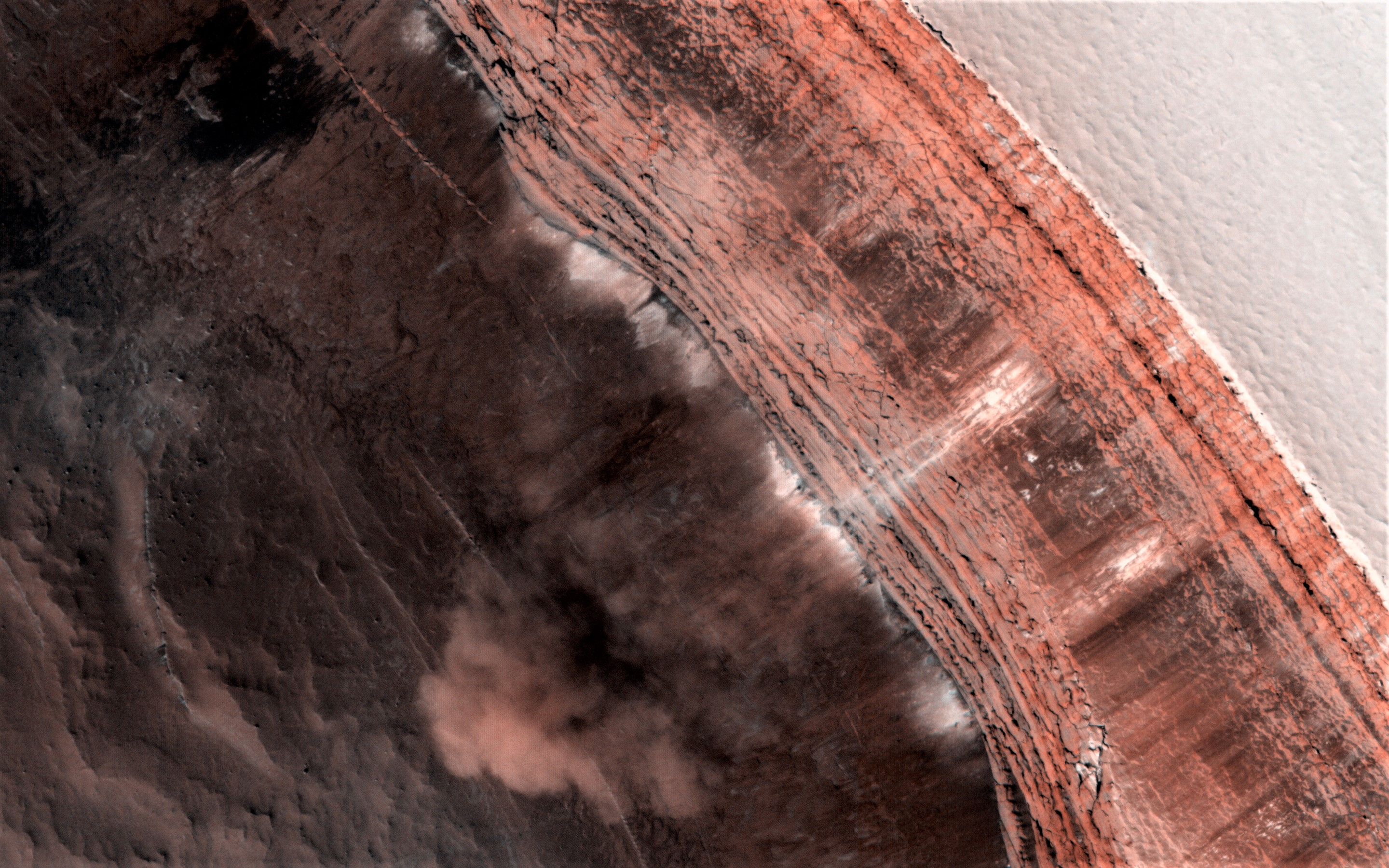
27 November 2011

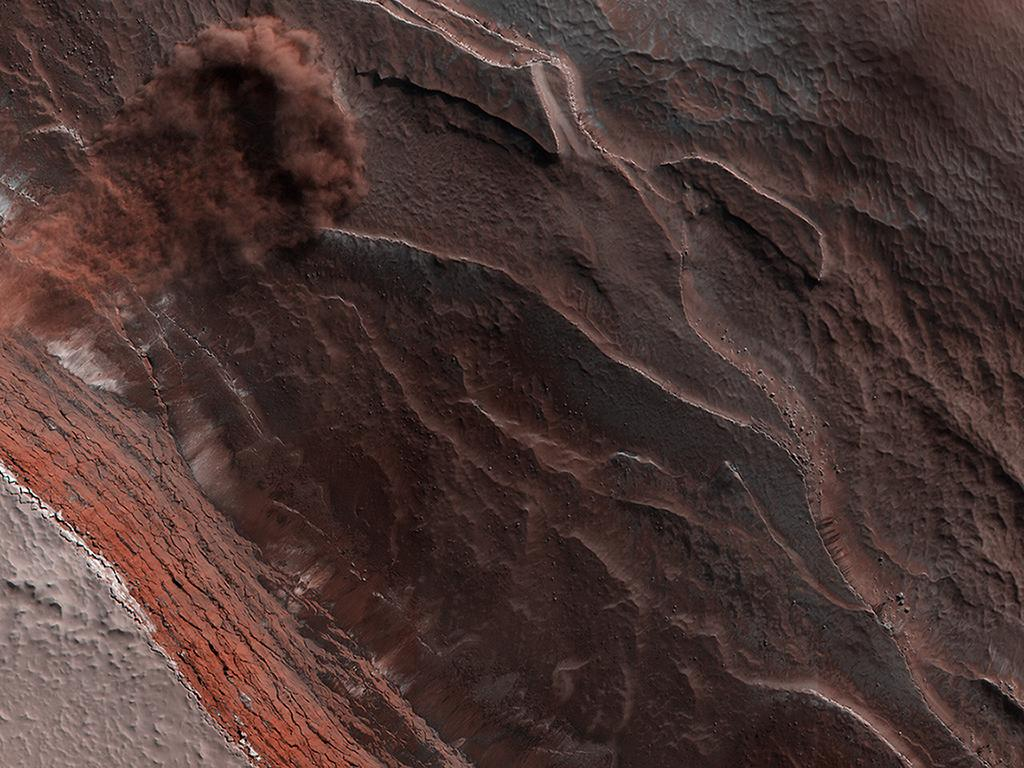
29 May 2019

== See also ==
=== Related flows ===
- Glacier collapse
- Debris flow
- Gravity current
- Lahar
- Landslide
- Mudflow
- Pyroclastic flow
- Rockslide
- Rock-ice avalanche
- Slush flow

=== Avalanche disasters ===
- 1999 Galtür avalanche
- Montroc
- 2012 Gayari Sector avalanche
