= Palanche de la Cretta =

Mountain in Switzerland

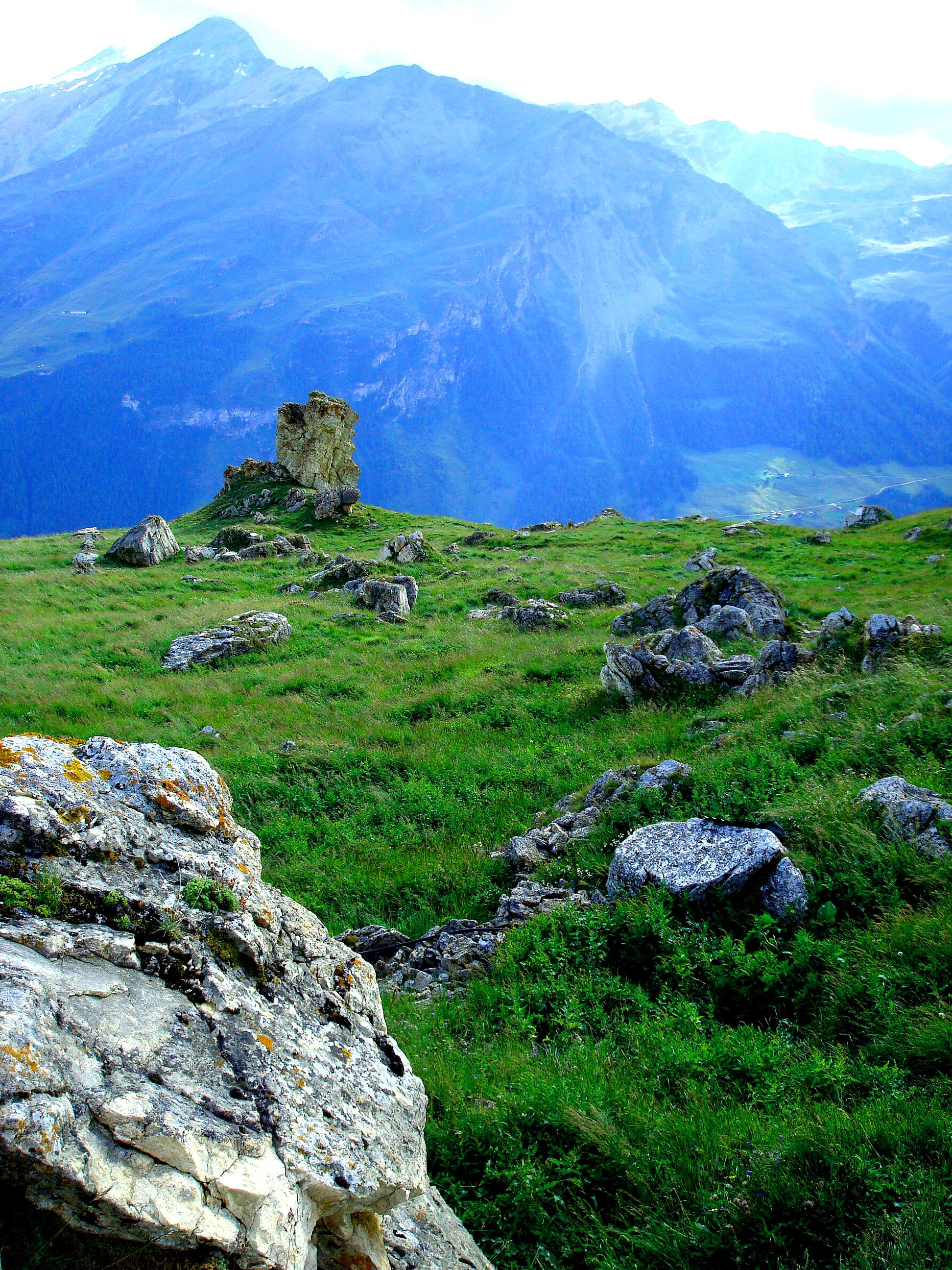
- The Palanche de la Cretta (centre left) and Mont de l'Etoile (left) from above Evolène

Highest point
- Elevation: 2,927 m (9,603 ft)
- Prominence: 58 m (190 ft)
- Coordinates: 46°5′38.8″N 7°27′52.4″E

Geography
- Location within Switzerland
- Location: Valais, Switzerland
- Parent range: Pennine Alps

The Palanche de la Cretta (or (La) Palantse de la Cretta) is a mountain of the Swiss Pennine Alps, overlooking Evolène in the canton of Valais. It lies north of Mont de l'Etoile.
