= Snowpack types =

Types of snow accumulation

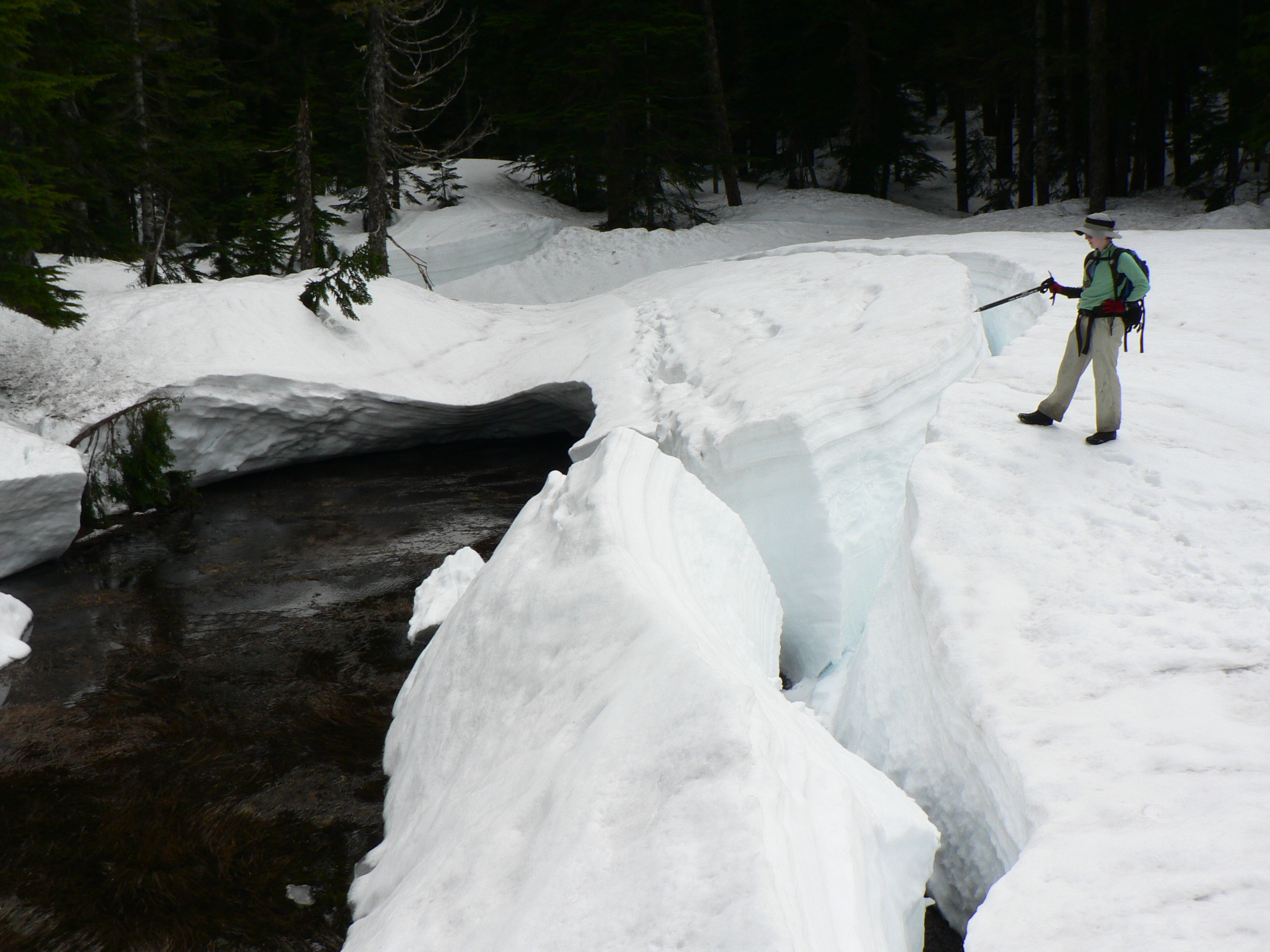
Maritime snowpacks typically feature very deep snow as seen at this creek in Washington

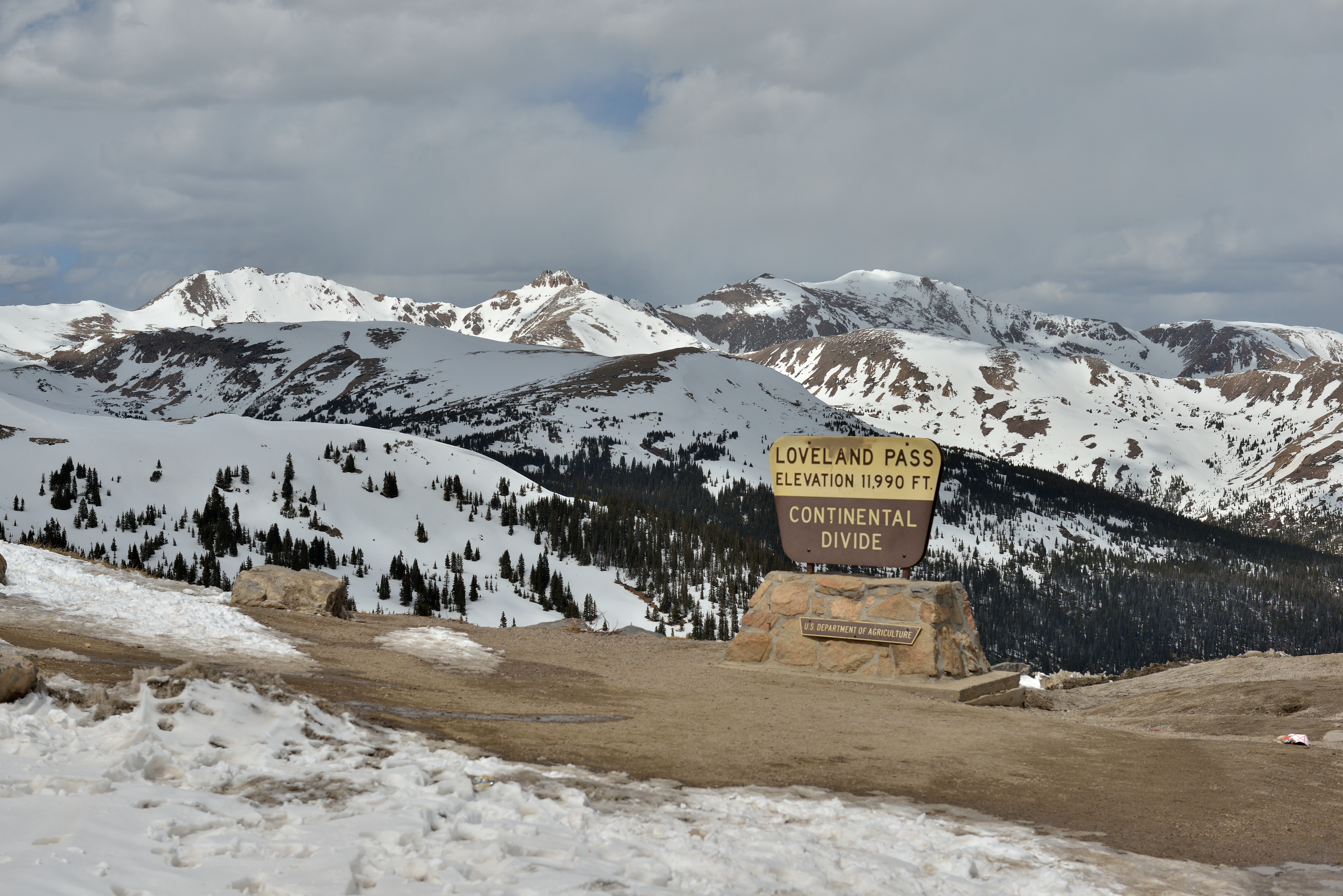
Less snow is typical for continental snowpacks. Loveland Pass, Colorado

The three main types of snowpack are maritime, intermountain, and continental.

Maritime snowpacks are typically found on the windward side of continents, near oceans. They usually feature warmer winter temperatures that stay around freezing (−5 to 5 °C (20 to 40 °F)) and more precipitation, leading to a snowpack that is over 3 metres (10 ft) deep. Frequent storms deposit snow with a higher snow-water equivalent, often around 10 to 20 percent moisture. Most avalanches occur during or immediately after storms, as weak layers do not persist with warmer temperatures and frequent midwinter rain. Thus, it is typical to ski steep, avalanche prone terrain as soon as 24 to 36 hours after the storm. Many areas with a maritime snowpack receive 15 to 25 metres (49 to 82 ft) of annual snowfall. Areas with a typically maritime snowpack include the Cascade Range, Coastal Range, western Norway, and the Sierra Nevada.

Intermountain or transitional snowpack is colder and drier than maritime snowpack, usually around 1.5 to 3 metres (5 to 10 ft) deep. Temperatures stay colder than maritime climates but warmer than continental climates, around −15 to 3 °C (5 to 40 °F). Although intermountain snowpacks can feature persistent weak layers, avalanches also occur within storm snow. Unlike in maritime climates, instability lingers for several days to weeks after storms. Typical areas for this snowpack include the Wasatch Range, Selkirks, and parts of the Alps.

Continental snowpacks are the coldest and thinnest, featuring snow less than 1.5 metres (5 ft) deep and winter temperatures under −10 °C (10 °F). Storms are less frequent and deposit less snow, which is less dense. Faceted snow and depth hoar is the typical weak layer, often covered by hard wind slabs. The instability is very persistent and often leads to higher rates of avalanche fatalities. Areas with a typically continental snowpack include Colorado, the Canadian Rockies, the Brooks Range, and the Pamir Mountains. Because of the persistence of weak layers, forecasting relies much more heavily on snowpit tests to determine stability. In continental climates, avalanches can start on less steep slopes than in intermountain or maritime climates.

Local and regional weather conditions can change the type of snowpack typical for a region, for example a typically maritime region might have a cold and thin early season snowpack that resembles continental type, while even a few feet apart the snowpack depth can vary enough to produce vastly different conditions. Elevation also dramatically affects the type of avalanches typically experienced in a particular area.
