= Evolène avalanche =

Swiss weather-induced crisis

The Evolène avalanche of 21 February 1999, killed 12 people in the Swiss canton of Valais. Just two days later, the larger avalanche of Galtür caused 31 deaths in Austria.

Evolène is a commune consisting of several far-flung villages. From Evolène proper (at 1371 m altitude) to Les Haudères (1454 m) and further up to Arolla (2006 m), the valley, situated between Zermatt and Verbier, is a rather little-known tourist destination.

The snow buildup being caused by the same weather phenomenon as in the Galtür catastrophe, the avalanche danger was raised in all alpine areas. For the Bernese Oberland, the Swiss institute for avalanche research (SLF) estimated the avalanche danger to be "very large" ("sehr groß"), but only "large" for that part of Valais.

After the morning prayer service of 21 February, the person responsible for avalanche safety – a mountain guide with 25 years of experience – announced to the mayor that he performed an analysis of the snow structure at the village of La Sage (1727 m), and that he deemed the avalanche danger to be "very large" (which required the evacuation of un-reinforced buildings in certain areas, and the closure of certain roads). Then, at 8:30 PM, at a breadth of about 4 km, between the mountain tops of Sasseneire and Pointe du Tsaté, the snow cover ruptured and sled downhill. The snow masses being canalized by several gulleys, the avalanche flowed along the Borza stream and killed nine people on the valley floor at about 1400 m – five in the chalet "Théodoloz" at La Confraric, and two each in a car. Up at Près de Villa (about 1800 m, to the north-west of the Villaz village), three others were killed.

At the center of the criminal procedures stood the question of who was responsible for estimating the avalanche danger, if the town's emergency plans and precautions were sufficient, and why no evacuations and no road closures took place. The mayor and the safety chief were both sentenced for negligent manslaughter and negligent injury, as well as disrupting public transport.

Pierre-Henri Pralong, the former mayor of Evolène’s village council was given a suspended sentences of three months and fined Swiss Francs 20,000. Mountain guide André Georges, who was in charge of security in the village, was given a suspended sentences of two months and fined Swiss Francs 30,000.

== Aftermath ==
As a result of the avalanche, the Intercantonal Early Warning and Crisis Information System was introduced in 2002. More Intercantonal Measurement and Information System (IMIS) stations were installed, almost doubling the amount compared to 1999 to provide wider coverage in the measuring network to update the system.
