= Slush (disambiguation) =

Slush is a slurry mixture of liquid and solid forms of water.

Slush may also refer to:

- Slush (album), the experimental 1997 album by the band OP8
- Slush (event), a startup conference in Northern Europe
- Slush casting, a metal casting process
- Slush flow, type of snow avalanche
- Slush fund, an auxiliary monetary account or a reserve fund
- Slush hydrogen, a combination of liquid hydrogen and solid hydrogen
- Slush pile, unsolicited manuscripts
- Slush powder, polymers that can absorb large amounts of a liquid
- Slushy, also known as a Slush, a blended ice drink, with sugar, fruit, and/or other flavorings

== See also ==
- Slush pump (disambiguation)
- Slosh
