= Melt-Freeze Crust =

A Melt-Freeze Crust is a type of snow crust made up of hardened layer of ice or packed snow, which forms when a layer of snow becomes wet before refreezing.

The crust can refer to both the frozen exposed top surface of snow and discontinuities between other layers of snow, caused when additional snowfall covers the once-exposed crust.

== Types of Melt-Freeze crusts ==
Melt-freeze crusts form specifically when layers of snow freeze after becoming wet. There are two types of snow crusts that fall under the classification of melt-freeze crusts:

- Sun Crusts, which are created when solar radiation heats and melts the surface layer of snow before it freezes; and
- Rain Crusts, which are created when wet precipitation (like rain) saturates the top surface of snow before it freezes.

Melt-freeze crusts may also refer to crusts that form when daytime ambient temperatures are high enough to melt the top layer of snow before freezing in the colder nighttime.

== Characteristics ==
Melt-freeze crust layers can vary in thickness, size and strength, depending on the conditions that formed it, and are generally brittle and smooth.

Crusts generally does not bond with either the snow layer below it or any subsequent snowfall above it, creating glide surfaces where layers of snow can slip past each other during an avalanche; slabs of the crust layer can be as large as 10,000 square meters and 10 meters thick.
