= Tsa de l'Ano =

Mountain in Switzerland

- Location within Switzerland

Highest point
- Elevation: 3,368 m (11,050 ft)
- Prominence: 109 m (358 ft)
- Parent peak: Monte Rosa
- Coordinates: 46°04′41″N 7°34′23″E

Geography
- Location: Valais, Switzerland
- Parent range: Pennine Alps

The Tsa de l'Ano is a mountain of the Swiss Pennine Alps, located east of Les Haudères in the canton of Valais. It is separated by the Col de Mourti (3,259 m) from the Pointes de Mourti to the southeast, on the range between the valley of Hérens and the Moiry Glacier (part the Val d'Anniviers). To the north of the main summit is the secondary peak of Pointe de Moiry (3,303 m), which is separated by the Col de la Couronne from the Couronne de Bréona (3,159 m).

Tsa de l'Ano is reached from the Swiss Alpine Club's Cabanna de Moiry (2,825) by traversing the Moiry Glacier and ascending to Col de Moiry; Pointe de Moiry is more easily reached via its southeastern flank, the ridge connecting the two peaks is comparatively difficult. Both peaks are relatively little frequented by alpinists. An easier ascent to Tsa de l'Ano (but mostly without any marked paths) is via its western ridge from Salay (Ferpècle, 1,766 m).
