= Slush pump =

Slush pump can mean:

- In petroleum engineering, a pump used to circulate the drilling fluid during rotary drilling
- Slang for automatic transmission
- Slang for trombone, a brass musical instrument

== See also ==
- Slush (disambiguation)
