= 1999 Galtür avalanche =

Avalanche in Galtür, Austria

Galtür avalanche
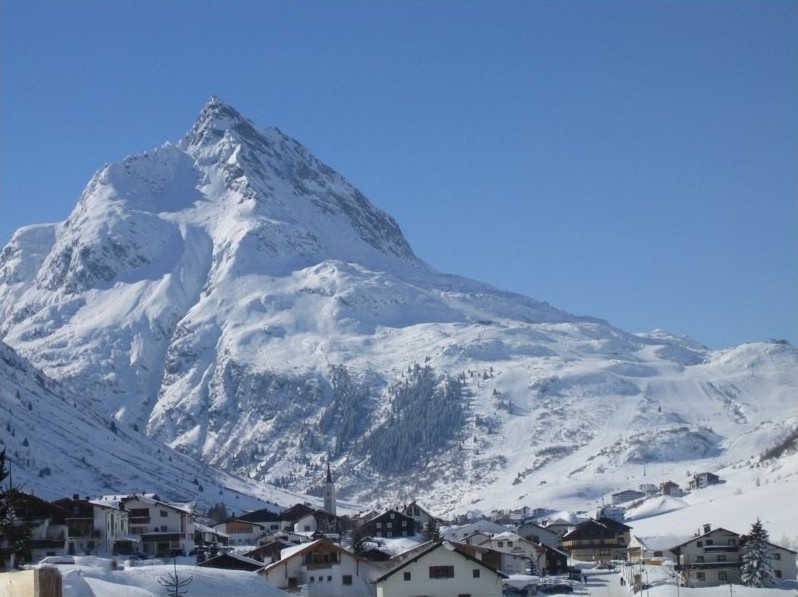
- Galtür, Austria
- Date: 23 February 1999
- Time: 3:59 pm
- Location: Galtür, Austria; 46°58′05″N 10°11′15″E
- Cause: Avalanche
- Deaths: 31
- Injuries: 26
- Convictions: None

The Galtür avalanche occurred on 23 February 1999 in the Alpine village of Galtür, Austria. At 50 m (160 ft) high and traveling at 290 km/h (180 mph), the powder avalanche overturned cars, destroyed buildings and buried 57 people. By the time rescue crews managed to arrive, 31 people had died. It was considered the worst Alpine avalanche in 40 years. Three major weather systems originating from the Atlantic accounted for large snowfalls totaling around four meters in the area. Freeze-thaw conditions created a weak layer on top of an existing snow pack; further snow was then deposited on top. This, coupled with high wind speeds, created large snow drifts and caused roughly 170,000 tons of snow to be deposited.

== Avalanche zones ==
Like most populated regions of the Alps, Galtür was hazard-zoned according to the perceived risk of avalanches into red, yellow, and green areas. Red zones are considered highly vulnerable; no development is permitted in these areas. Yellow zones pose a moderate risk; development is allowed but structures must be reinforced to resist avalanches. Green zones are considered avalanche-safe; development is permitted with no reinforcement required. Galtür had been designated a green zone, and because of this, the resort was not well-prepared for an avalanche.

== Cause ==
In January 1999, a series of storms occurred, bringing with them 4 m (13 ft) of fine snow forming a large snow pack on the mountains above Galtür. Later that month a melt-crust developed, the upper layers melting during the day and refreezing at night. The cause of the avalanches puzzled scientists for a long time: although the area was prone to avalanches, never before had they occurred on such a scale as this, reaching the village. A complex sequence of events led to the event. On 20 January, an Atlantic storm was forming 4,000 km (2,500 mi) away. Turbulent warm air from the tropics headed north, cooled, and swung back towards Europe. This initiated a series of storms. Combined with cold Arctic air coming from the north, there was a very dry and light type of snowfall exceeding 4 m (13 ft). Therefore, a massive snow pack formed on the mountains above Galtür. Northwest winds piled the snow to increasing depths. At Galtür, the snow initially bonded with the underlying ice of the melt crust and it was able to stay in place for longer than usual.

As new snow fell, the melt-crust became unstable because of the ever increasing weight of the snow on top. On 23 February at 15:59, the melt-crust failed; the resulting powder avalanche contained a central layer of which scientists were unaware. Known as the saltation layer, it was primarily responsible for the destruction of buildings. As the powerful powder avalanche crashed down the mountainside, it picked up more and more snow as it went. There were also 120 km/h (75 mph) winds which caused the saltation layer of snow to move causing this disaster.

== Emergency response ==
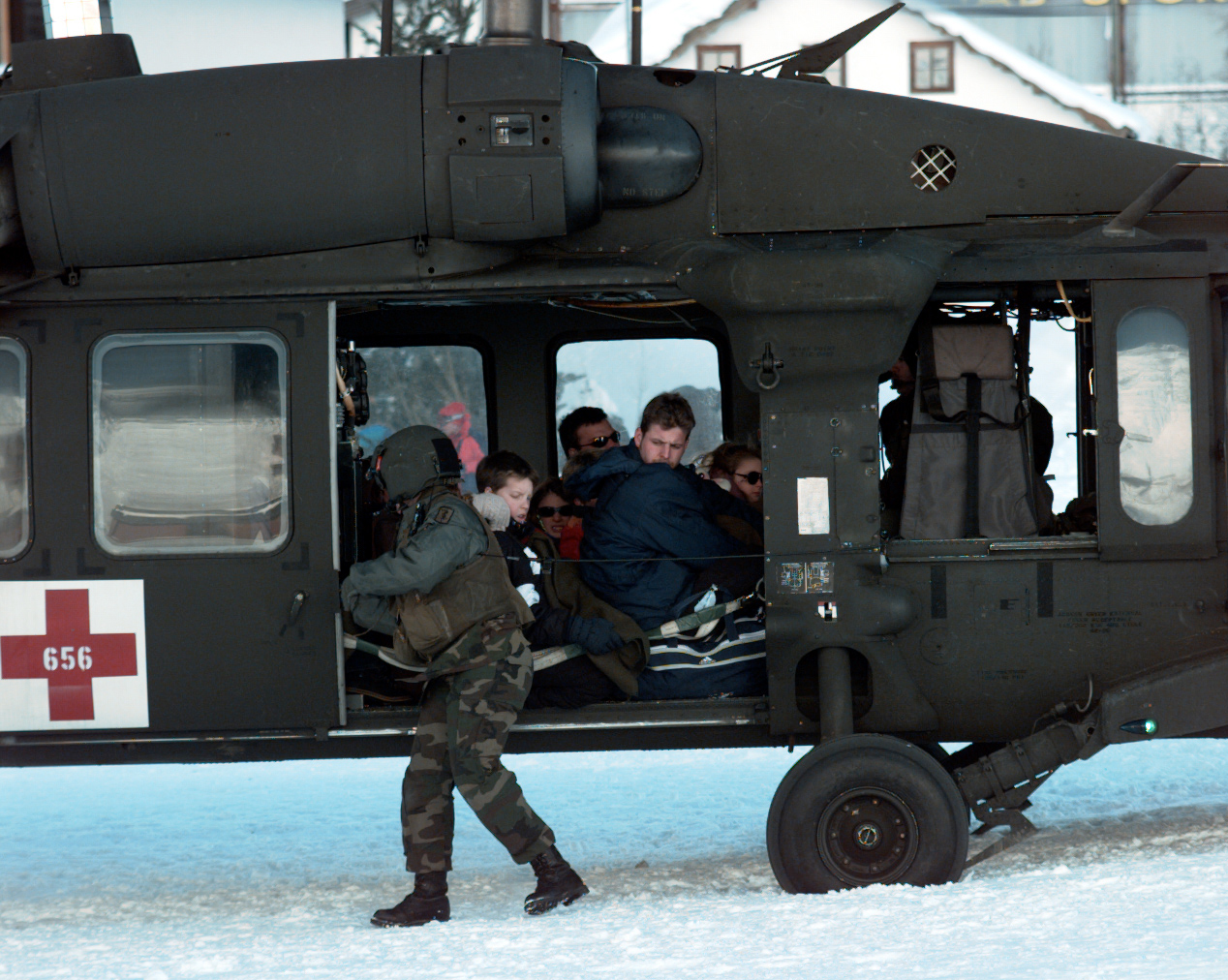
United States Army UH-60 Blackhawk helicopter crew preparing to evacuate stranded tourists in Galtür, Austria, on 25 February 1999

Soon after the avalanche rescuers began to look for survivors; in 24 hours the rescuers saved 26 people. A rescue dog, Heiko, amply proved the value dogs have in avalanche rescue, saving many lives, as did a second dog, a Labrador-Alsatian cross named Jack, who was buried under snow for 24 hours. The day after the avalanche, 31 people were confirmed dead. Six were locals and 25 were tourists.

Galtür and several neighboring communities needed supplies and evacuation. Several countries contributed aircraft: to support the Austrian Bell 212, Bell 204 and Alouette III helicopters, Germany sent UH-1D and CH-53G, the German Federal Border Guard (Bundesgrenzschutz) Super Pumas, the U.S. Army 10 UH-60 Black Hawks, and the Swiss and French air forces together six Super Puma/Cougar helicopters. In addition to them, the Austrian Ministry of the Interior supplied six helicopters, private companies nine, and the ÖAMTC used two EC 135 rescue helicopters to transport injured patients.

An international group of over 50 helicopters from Austria, France, Switzerland, Germany, and the USA evacuated over 7,000 people.

In 935 hours of flight, 18,406 people and 271 tons of supplies were transported. In order to avoid causing additional avalanches, the crews flew below the tree line. The helicopters flew on the right side of the valley to separate traffic. The Austrian helicopters transported the evacuated to the army barracks at Landeck, while the other air crews flew the evacuees to a section of the Inn valley highway.

== Aftermath ==
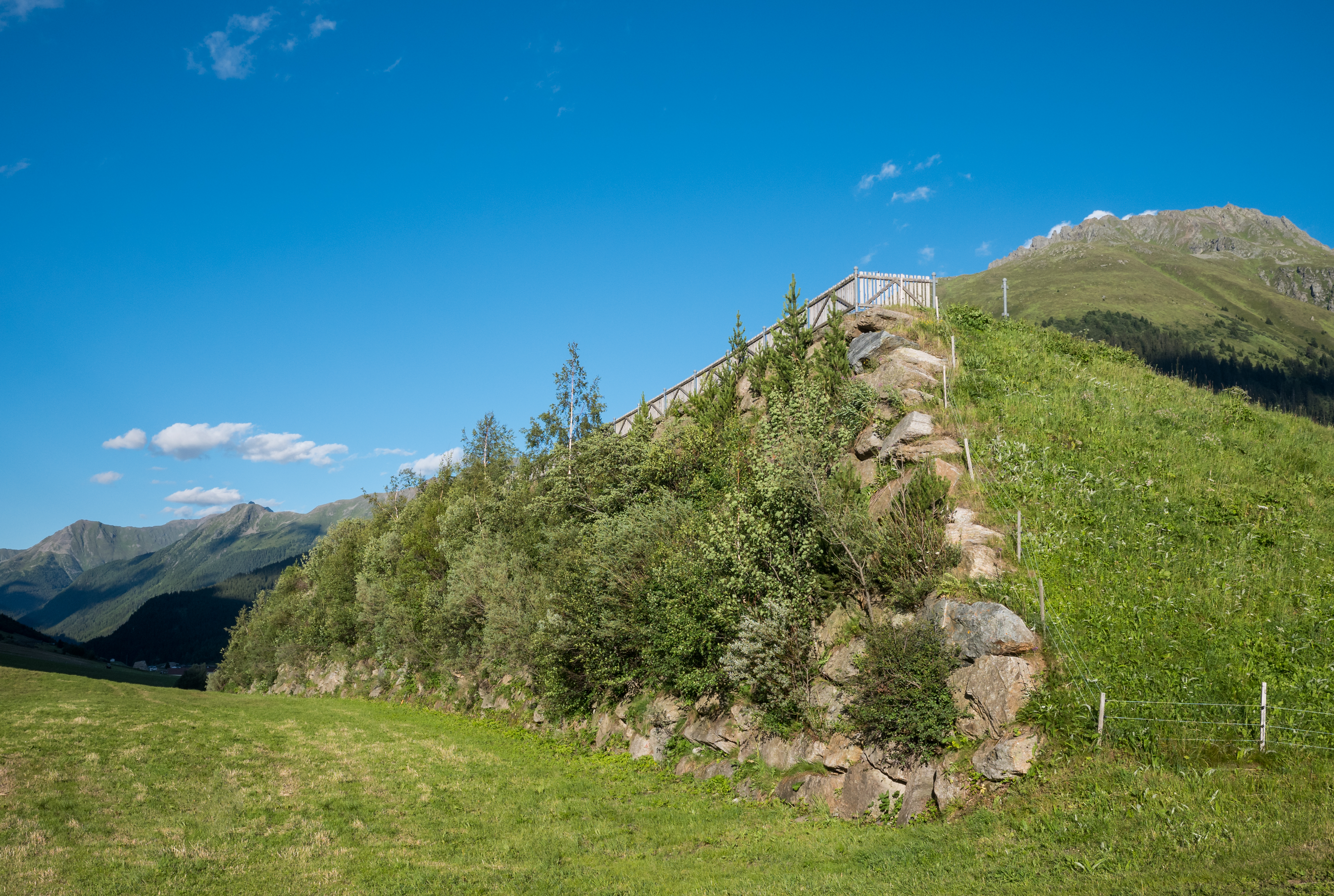
Avalanche protection wall built after the avalanche of 1999

The families of the victims demanded to know why the avalanche penetrated the supposedly safe zone and devastated Galtür. However, hazard zoning is dependent on the historical record, and there was no evidence of avalanches traveling so far on this track in the past. Since this disaster there have been renewed efforts to improve avalanche knowledge and forecasting so that hazard zones can be accurately predicted. This is particularly important if land use or climate changes render past information less useful. The response has included the extension of the hazard zones, with steel fences constructed on all mountainsides above the village to break up the areas where unstable snow packs can form, creating smaller shelves overall that reduce the size and scale of any future avalanches. A 300 m (980 ft) avalanche dam directly protects the village. There has been rezoning, so the former Green zone is now a higher risk zone.

== See also ==
- The Evolène avalanche in Switzerland two days earlier, in which 12 people died
- Rigopiano avalanche
