= Grande Dent de Veisivi =

Mountain in Switzerland

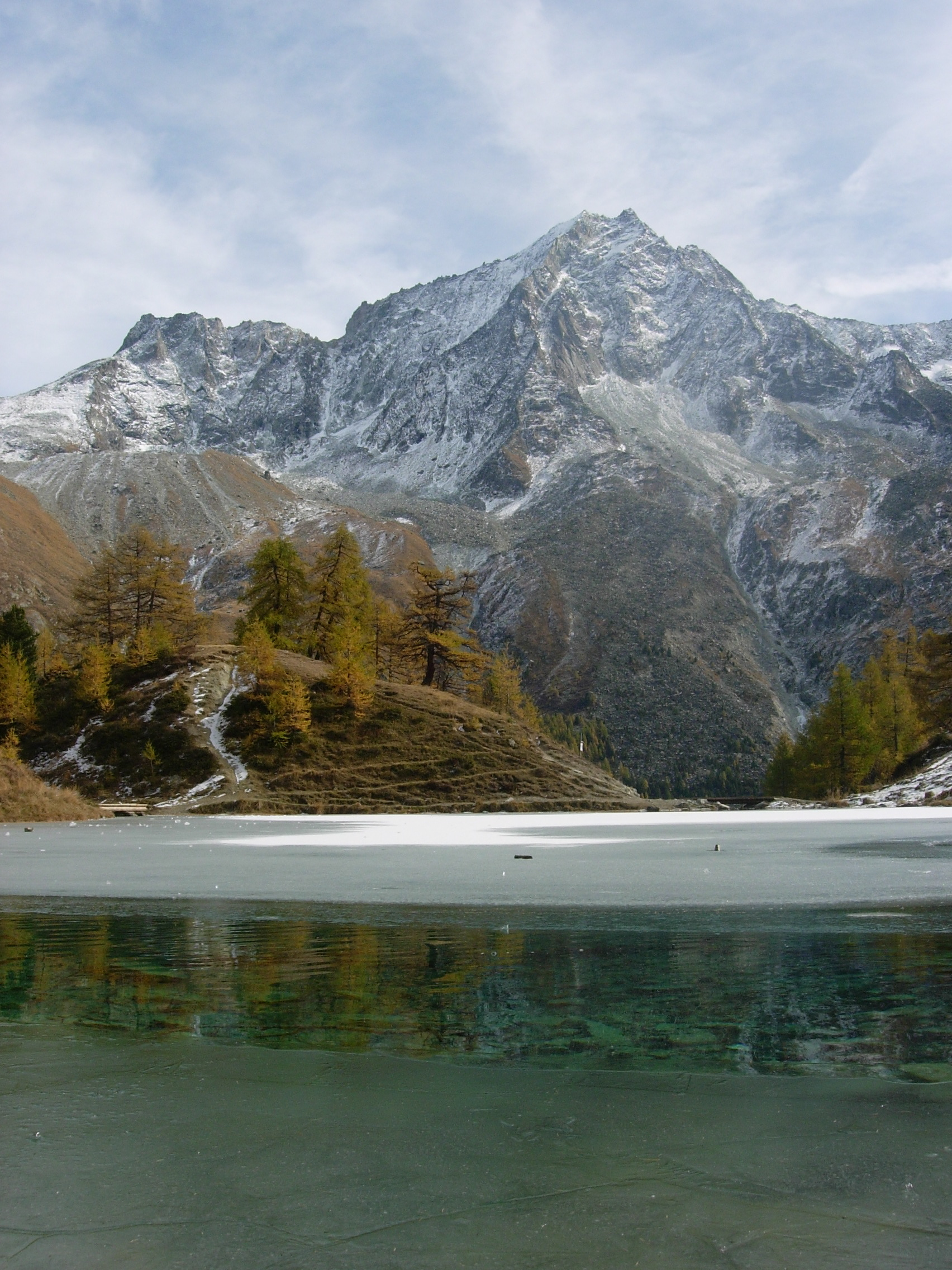
- Grande Dent de Veisivi (left summit) and Dent de Perroc (centre)

Highest point
- Elevation: 3,418 m (11,214 ft)
- Prominence: 72 m (236 ft)
- Parent peak: Dent de Perroc
- Coordinates: 46°3′2.4″N 7°31′40.4″E

Geography
- Location: Valais, Switzerland
- Parent range: Pennine Alps

The Grande Dent de Veisivi is a mountain of the Swiss Pennine Alps, overlooking Les Haudères in the canton of Valais. Nearby is the Petite Dent de Veisivi.
