= 1993 Bayburt Üzengili avalanche =

Natural disaster in Turkey

- Date: January 18, 1993
- Time: 07:45 EET (05:15 UTC)
- Location: Üzengili, Bayburt Province, Turkey; 40.4985°N 40.3851°E
- Deaths: 59 dead
- Injuries: 21 injured

The 1993 Bayburt Üzengili avalanche occurred on January 18, 1993, at around 07:45 local time (05:45 UTC) in Üzengili, a village of Bayburt Province in northeastern Turkey. It killed 59 people and injured 21, destroying 72 houses.

== Location and terrain ==
Üzengili is a mountain village situated at an elevation of 2,025 m (6,644 ft) on the southern edge of the Soğanlı Mountains within the Eastern Blacksea Mountain Range (Turkish: Doğu Karadeniz Dağları). It is 36 km (22 mi) north-east of Bayburt close to the Bayburt-Trabzon provincial border.

The top of the hill at the backside of the village is 3,193 m (10,476 ft) high Amsl. Unlike the northern slopes of the mountains in that region, which are densely covered with forest, the south facing part, where the village is located, has almost no trees.

In 1990, the village had a population of 355.

== Weather conditions ==
According to the data from the Turkish State Meteorological Service, recorded at the weather station in Bayburt, the area was covered by snow on January 16. As the temperature there was −5 °C (23 °F) at 21:00 local time on that day, it dropped to −15 °C (5 °F) the next day, resulting in formation of surface crusts. During the daytime of January 17, the temperature rose up and the snow pack melted at the surface. In the late hours of that day, the snow pack's surface formed a melt-freeze crust by refreezing with the dropping temperature. Freshly precipitated snow in the night of January 17 and in the early hours of the next day covered the melt-crust surface.

== Disaster ==
The avalanche flowed 4,150 m (13,620 ft) downwards at an average slope angle of 17 degrees, and struck the village at around 07:45 local time. The snow masses destroyed a total of 72 houses and buried more than 70 people and a great number of animals. The natural disaster caused the life losses of 59 people and 650 livestock. 21 people were injured at the incident.

As a result of the disaster and the future avalanche risk at the location, Üzengili village, comprising 116 houses, has been relocated to another place in a safe zone. In 1997, the settlement counted 166 inhabitants.
