= Mont de l'Etoile =

Mountain in Switzerland

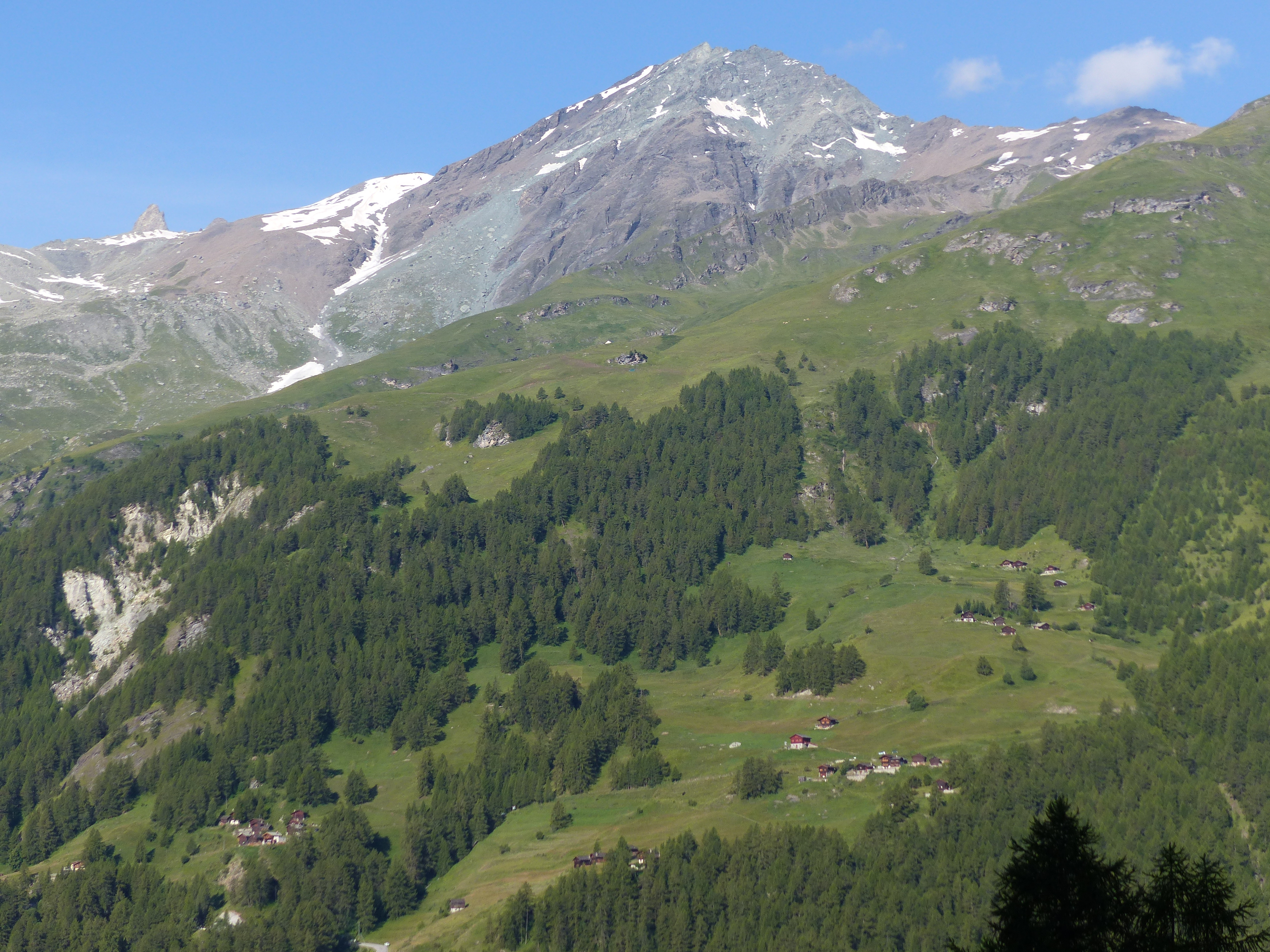
- Mont de l'Etoile (view from La Forclaz)

Highest point
- Elevation: 3,370 m (11,060 ft)
- Prominence: 120 m (390 ft)
- Parent peak: Aiguilles Rouges d'Arolla
- Listing: Mountains of Switzerland
- Coordinates: 46°04′25.5″N 7°27′0.4″E

Geography
- Location within Switzerland
- Location: Valais, Switzerland
- Parent range: Pennine Alps

Mont de l'Etoile is a mountain of the Swiss Pennine Alps, located west of Les Haudères in the canton of Valais. On its west side lies a glacier named Glacier de Vouasson.
