= Depth hoar =

Form of snow

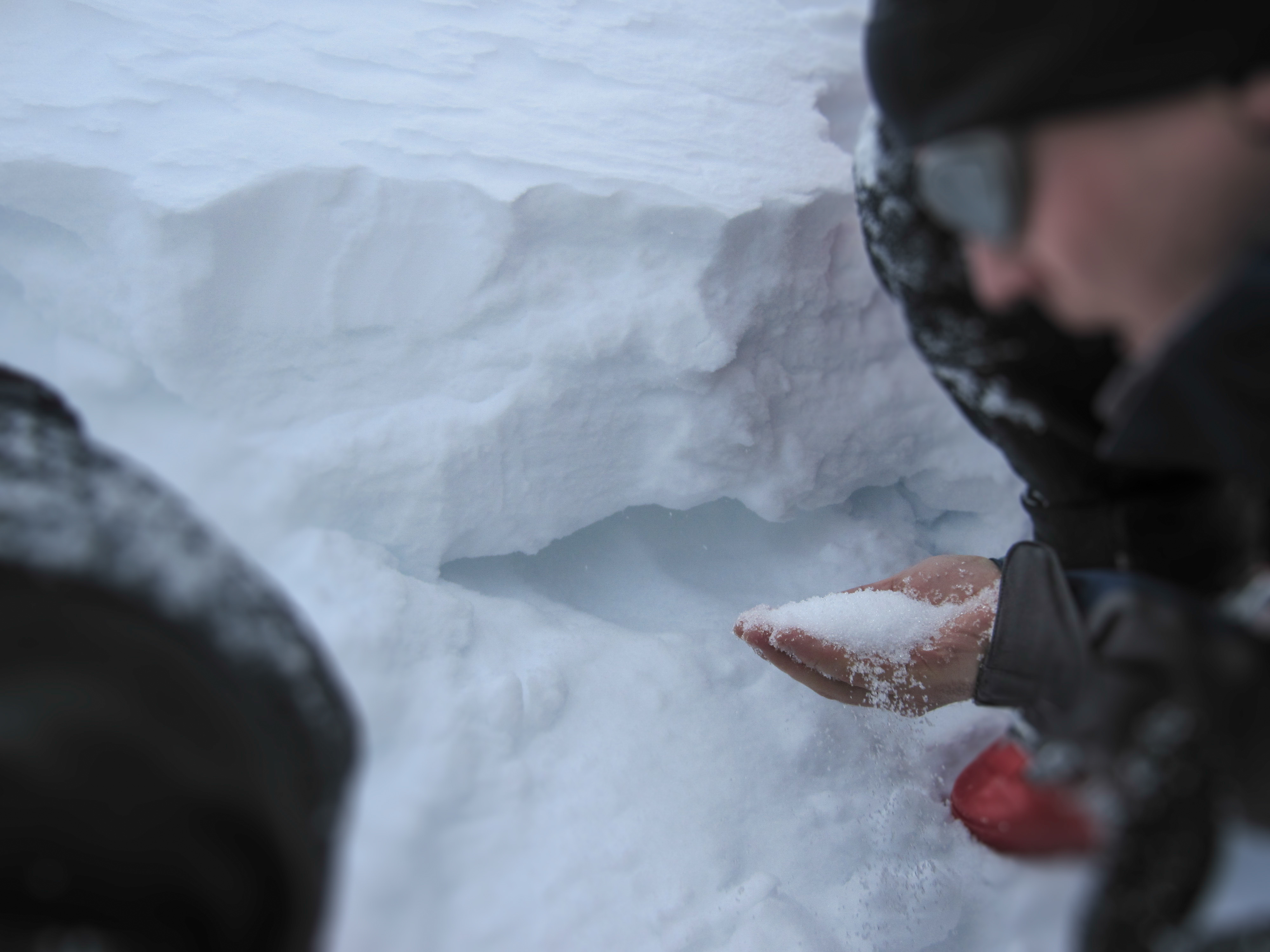
"Sugar snow" as a layer in a snowpack

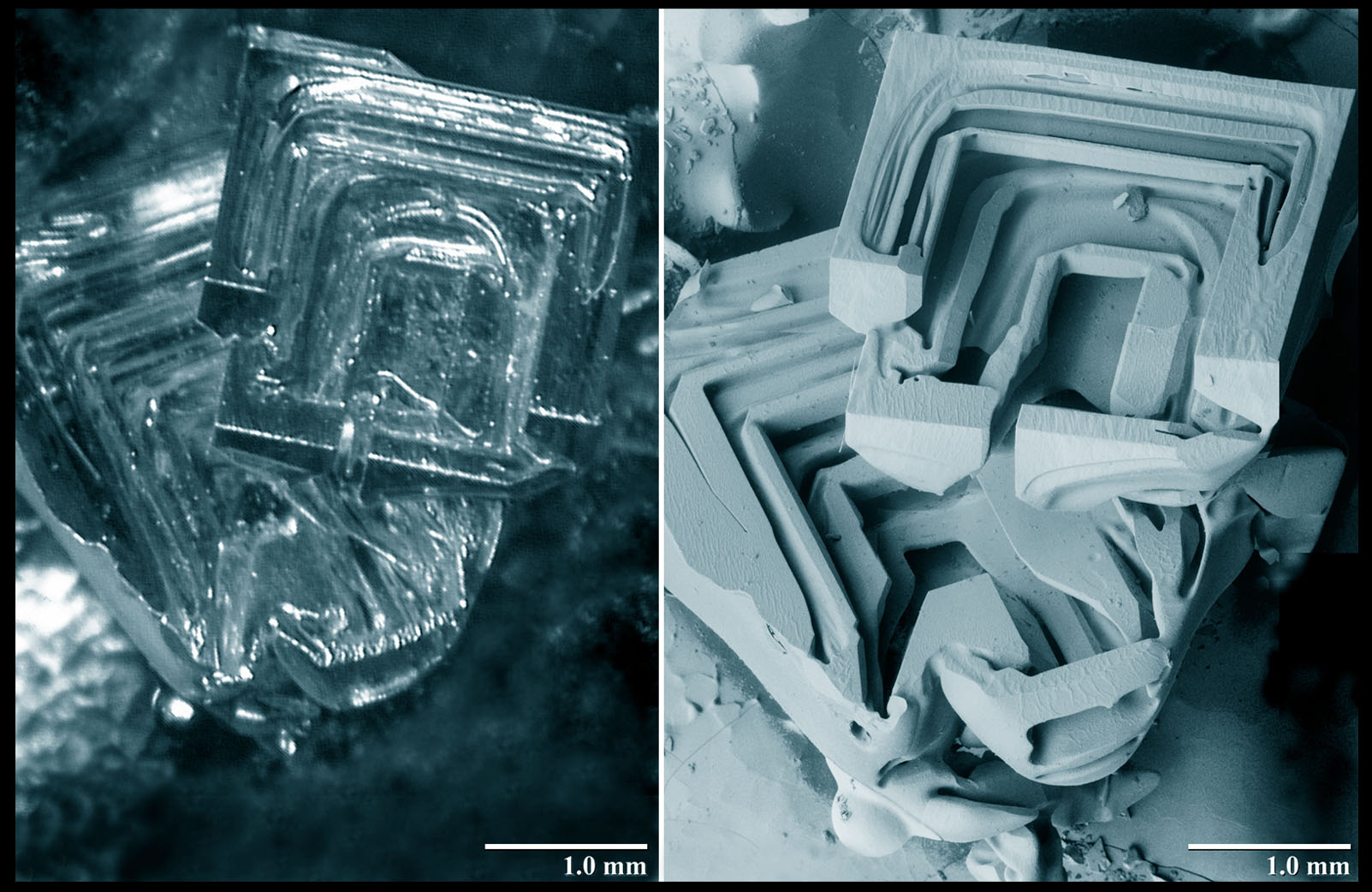
Depth hoar crystals, imaged with light and with scanning electron microscopy

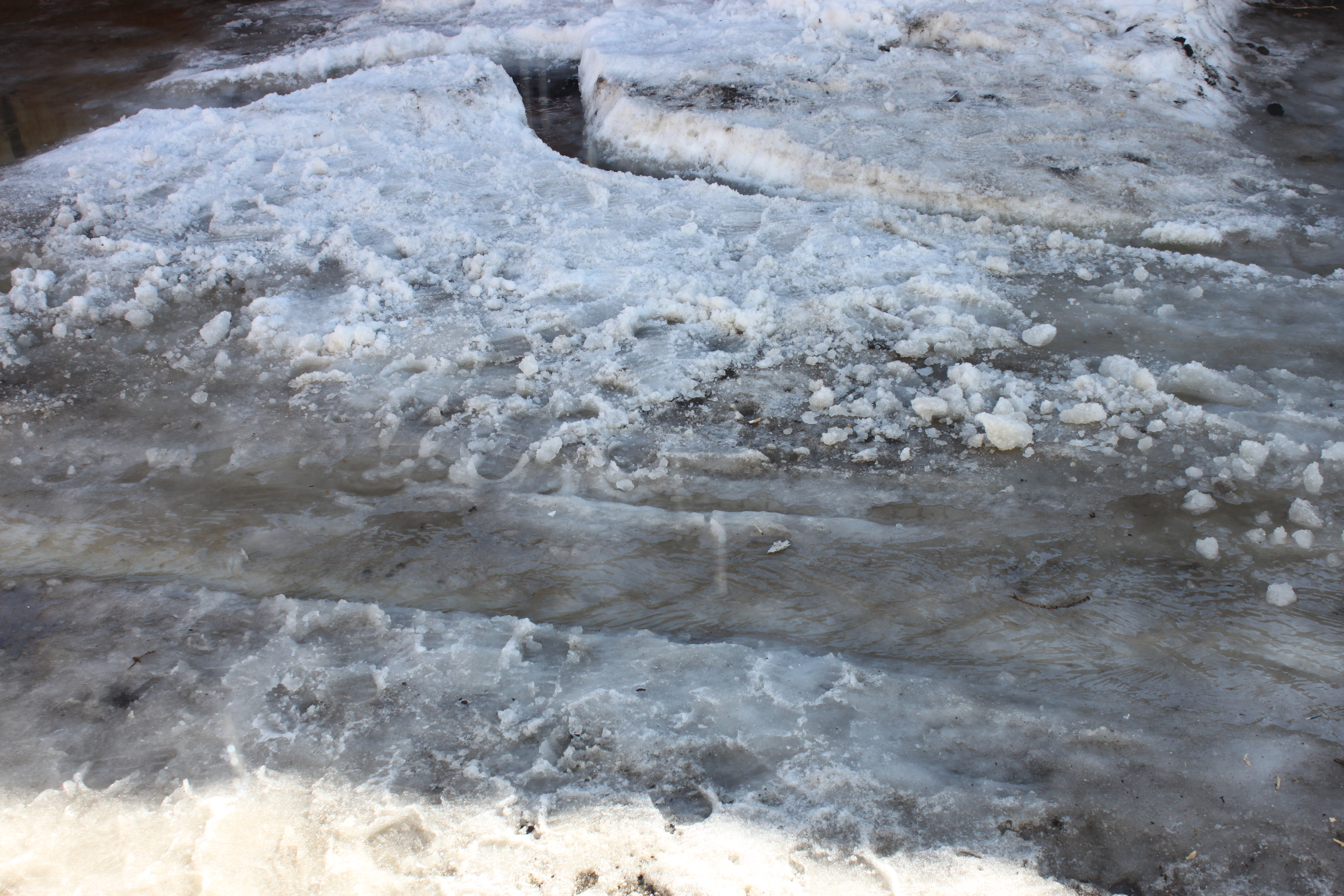
Sugar snow - panoramio

Depth hoar, also called sugar snow or temperature gradient snow (or TG snow), are large snow-crystals occurring at the base of a snowpack that form when uprising water vapor deposits, or desublimates, onto existing snow crystals. Depth hoar crystals are large, sparkly grains with facets that can be cup-shaped and that are up to 10 mm in diameter. Depth hoar crystals bond poorly to each other, increasing the risk for avalanches.

The formation of depth hoar in Arctic or Antarctic firn can cause isotopic changes in the accumulating ice. This can influence analysis of ice cores in scientific research.
