= Slush flow =

Type of snow avalanche

A slushflow is rapid mass movement of water and snow, and is categorized as a type of debris flow. Slushflows are caused when water reaches a critical concentration in the snowpack due to more water inflow than outflow. The high water concentration weakens the cohesion of the snow crystals and increases the weight of the snowpack. A slushflow is released when the component of the force of gravity parallel to the slope generates a hydraulic pressure gradient exceeding the tensile strength and basal friction of the snowpack.

While frequently compared to an avalanche, they have some key differences. Slushflows are lower in frequency than avalanches, have higher water content, are more laminar in flow, and have lower velocity. They most commonly occur at higher latitudes in the winter during high precipitation and in the spring during high snowmelt. Because of their high water content, they can flow down gentle slopes of only a few degrees at low altitudes. They are a significant hazard in Norway and Iceland and are responsible for the deaths of dozens of people as well as the destruction of buildings and the closure of roads.
