= Üzengili, Bayburt =

Üzengili
- Village
- Location within Turkey
- Country: Turkey
- Province: Bayburt
- District: Bayburt
- Population (2021): 155
- Time zone: UTC+3 (TRT)

Üzengili is a village in the Bayburt District, Bayburt Province, Turkey. Its population is 155 (2021). In 1993 an avalanche struck the village, killing 59 people.
