= Les Haudères =

Swiss village

Coordinates: 46°04′52″N 7°30′31″E

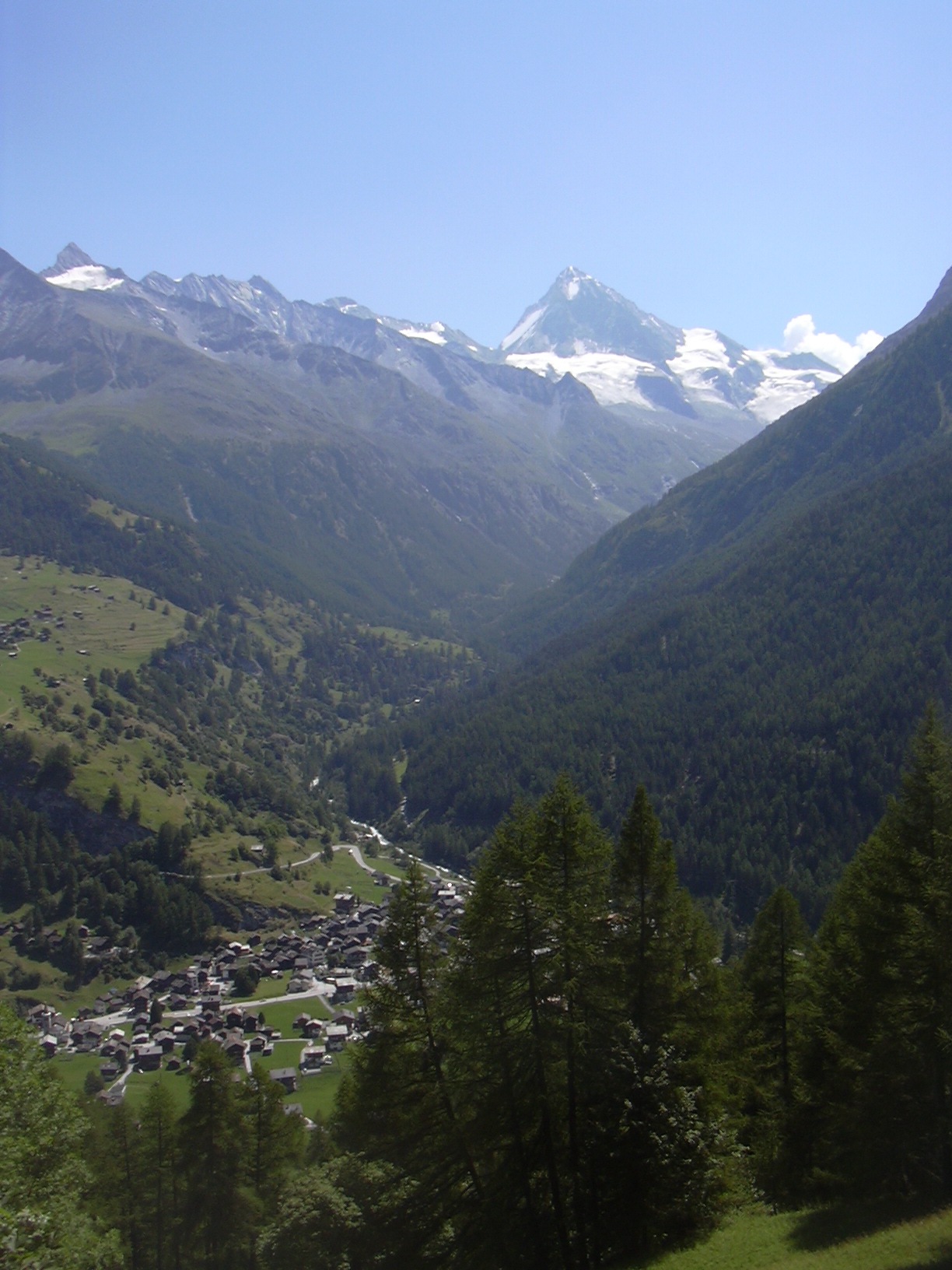
View of Les Haudère (Dent Blanche in background)

Les Haudères is a village in the Swiss Alps, located in the canton of Valais. The village is situated in the central part of the canton, in the Val d'Hérens, south of Sion. It belongs to the municipality of Evolène.

Les Haudères lies where the valleys of Arolla and Ferpècle meet to form the main valley of Hérens, at an altitude of 1,450 metres above sea level. The village is surrounded by peaks over 3,000 metres, among which the Dent de Veisivi (3,418), the Tsa de l'Ano (3,368 m) and Mont de l'Etoile (3,370 m).
