= Haute Route =

Hiking or ski route between the Mont Blanc in France and the Matterhorn in Switzerland

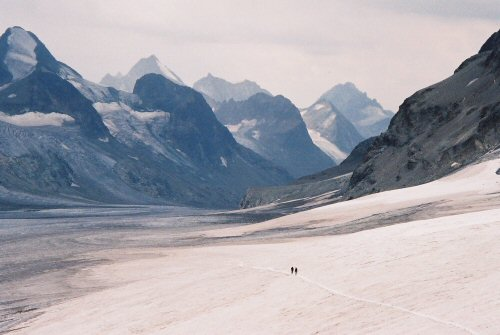
Two alpinists on the Otemma Glacier on the Haute Route

The Haute Route (or the High Route or Mountaineers' Route) is the name given to a route (with several variations) undertaken on foot or by ski touring between Chamonix, France, and the Matterhorn, in Zermatt, Switzerland.

First charted as a summer mountaineering route by members of the English Alpine Club in the mid-19th century, the route takes around 12+ days walking (or 7+ days skiing) for the 180 km from the Chamonix valley, home of Mont Blanc, to Zermatt, home of the Matterhorn. Originally dubbed "The High Level Route" in English by members of the hiking club, the term was translated into French when first successfully undertaken on skis in 1911. Since then the French term has prevailed. While the term haute route has become somewhat genericized for any of the many multi-day, hut-to-hut alpine tours, the "Chamonix-Zermatt Haute Route" remains the original.

Besides the original Haute Route, there is also a "Walker's" Haute Route, which is an alpine hiking trail that follows a network of well-marked and signposted paths. The "Walker's" route stays below 3000 meters and takes advantage of the popular mountain huts and small inns and hotels in the villages along the way. In the spring, summer and aumtumn, this route requires no ropes, crampons, or protection devices, unlike the actual Haute Route.

The original Haute Route has large portions of glacier travel, for which suitable mountaineering gear and experience is necessary. In the winter, ski touring gear is required, and depending upon the weather and route chosen, may require crampons, ropes and avalanche protection gear.

== Summer Haute Routes ==
There is occasionally a danger of collapsing glaciers which can render the path virtually impassable. However, a lower level variation exists that avoids crossing glaciers. The majority of hikers complete it in 12–16 days.

=== Huts and villages on the summer Haute Route glacier trek ===
- Le Tour village, France
- Albert Premier Hut
- Cabane du Trient or Orny Hut
- Champex town, Switzerland
- Valsorey Hut or Chanrion Hut
- Vignettes Hut
- Arolla village, Switzerland
- Bertol Hut
- Schonbiel Hut
- Zermatt town, Switzerland

=== Low level "Walker's Haute Route" variation huts and villages ===
- Chamonix town, France
- Argentière village, France
- Trient village, Switzerland
- Champex village, Switzerland
- Sembrancher village, Switzerland
- Le Chable village, Switzerland
- Verbier village, Switzerland
- Arolla village, Switzerland
- Les Haudères village, Switzerland
- Zinal village, Switzerland
- Gruben village, Switzerland
- St Niklaus village, Switzerland
- Zermatt town, Switzerland

== Ski Touring Haute Route ==
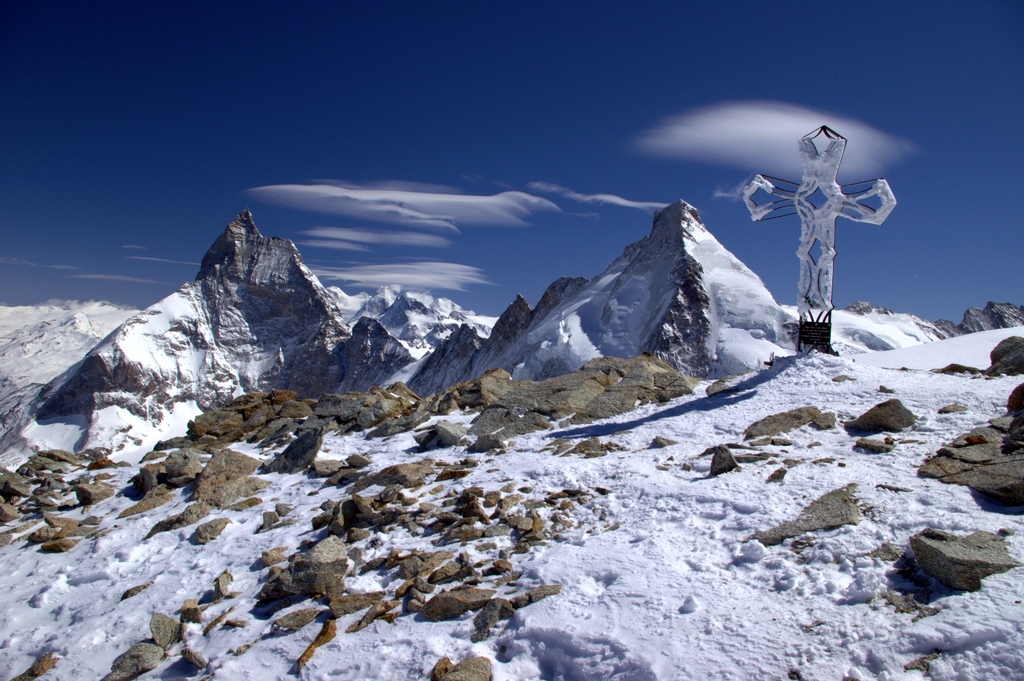
View of Matterhorn and Dent d'Hérens from the summit of Tête Blanche, high point of the Haut Route (3,710 m (12,172 ft))

First successfully completed in 1911, the Haute Route ski tour is among the most famous and coveted ski tours in the world. Using high mountain huts to allow skiers to stay high and cover substantial distances, it winds through the highest, peaks of the Alps from Mont Blanc to the Matterhorn. It requires good weather, favourable snow conditions and strong effort to complete this line. Because of this, roughly half of the skiers who begin the tour do not complete it.

There are many variations of the HLR (High Level Route) that work their way between Chamonix and Zermatt, including those listed below. It is also possible to add ascents of a number of ski peaks to any of the routes. The winter Haute Route deviates from the summer route to avoid terrain that is dangerous or impassable when snow-covered. Many people also ski the Haute Route in the opposite direction, by variations that select better ascent and descents.

Lionel Claudepierre, a member of PGHM of Bourg Saint Maurice, set a new record of 18h35m on Monday 15 April 2013.

=== Classic Route ===
The winter Haute Route's original line which involves long climbs and mountaineering with ice axe and crampons.

- Day 1: Argentiere village, France, over the Col du Chardonnet and the Fenêtre du Saleina to the Trient Hut.
- Day 2: Champex-Lac via the Val d'Arpette. Bus or taxi to Bourg-Saint-Pierre.
- Day 3: Long climb up to the Valsorey Hut on the shoulder of Grand Combin.
- Day 4: Over the Plateau du Couloir and down the Glacier du Mont Durand to the Chanrion Hut.
- Day 5: A long climb up the Otemma Glacier to the Vignettes Hut.
- Day 6: A long day to Zermatt over the Col de l'Evêque, Col du Mont Brulé and Col de Valpelline, then a long descent under the shoulder of the Matterhorn and Dent d'Herens.
- Day 7: Optional extension to Saas-Fee over the Adler Pass.

=== Verbier variation ===
Verbier variation of the Haute Route Track Commonly done by vehicles C: Chamonix T: Cabane du Trient M: Cabane du Mont Fort P: Cabane de Prafleuri D: Cabane des Dix V: Cabane des Vignettes Z: Zermatt

A skiing line that is frequently used.

- Day 1: Argentière, France, over the Col du Chardonnet and the Fenêtre du Saleina to the Trient Hut.
- Day 2: Champex-Lac via the Val d'Arpette. Bus or taxi to Verbier and the Mont Fort Hut.
- Day 3: Over the Rosablanche to the Prafleuri Hut.
- Day 4: Around Dixence reservoir and up to the Dix Hut.
- Day 5: Over the Pigne d'Arolla to the Vignettes Hut.
- Day 6: A long day to Zermatt over the Col de l'Evêque, Col du Mont Brulé and Col de Valpelline, then a long descent under the shoulder of the Matterhorn and Dent d'Herens.
- Day 7: Optional extension to Saas-Fee over the Adler Pass.

=== Grande Lui variation ===
A longer, harder, more technical route that eliminates the road break of the Verbier and Classic variations.

- Day 1: Argentiere village, France, over the Col du Chardonnet and the Fenêtre du Saleina to the Trient Hut or down to the Bivouac Dorés.
- Day 2: Over the Grande Lui through the Col du Saleina or around it via the Swiss Three Cols and a long descent to the village of La Fouly.
- Day 3: Up the Val Ferret and over to Grand St. Bernard Hospice.
- Day 4: Down to Great St Bernard Pass and over the shoulder of Mont Vélan to the Vélan Hut.
- Day 5: Up the Grand Combin and over the Plateau du Couloir, down the Glacier du Mont Durand to the Chanrion Hut.
- Day 6: A long non-technical climb up the Otemma Glacier or a stiffer climb over Les Portons to the Vignettes Hut.
- Day 7: A long day to Zermatt over the Col de l'Evêque, Col du Mont Brulé and Col de Valpelline, then a long descent under the shoulder of the Matterhorn and Dent d'Herens.
- Day 8: Optional extension to Saas-Fee over the Adler Pass.

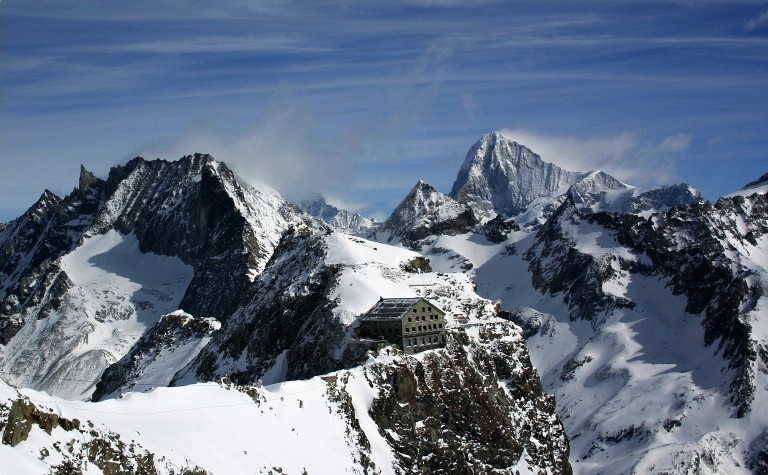
Vignettes Hut, near Arolla, Switzerland

=== "Backward" Haute Route ===
- Day 1: From Zermatt under the Matterhorn up to the Schonbiel Hut.
- Day 2: Over the Col de Valpelline and up to the Bertol Hut.
- Day 3: Down then up over Col Collon to the Vignettes Hut.
- Day 4: Over the Pigne d'Arolla and down Les Portons to Chanrion Hut.
- Day 5: Across the Otemma Gorge, up & over into the Aosta Valley. Hitchhike to La Palud.
- Day 6: Ride the lift to the Vallée Blanche. Descend to Montenvers and ski or take the cog train out to Chamonix.

=== Peaks and passes on the route ===
See the route descriptions.

Optional ski peak ascents along the listed Haute Route variations include the Mont Blanc, Rosablanche, Pigne d'Arolla, Mont Blanc de Cheilon, Mont Vélan, Breithorn. Some of these peak ascents will require an additional day or more, and range from easy to very technical and difficult.

== Incidents ==
In April 2018, a group of ten hikers found itself in extremely bad weather on the segment between the Dix Hut and the Vignettes Hut. Three survived.

On March 9, 2024, a group of six sent a distress signal while en route to Tête Blanche. Helicopter rescue launches were not possible due to strong winds. Climbing rescuers turned back after encountering bad weather and likely avalanches. The next day, a physician and a police officer could be dropped by helicopter to a site from which they reached the location of the group, finding five dead. The sixth body was recovered in August that year.

== See also ==
- Haute Route (cycling)
- Swiss Alps
