= Patrouille des Glaciers =

Ski mountaineering race

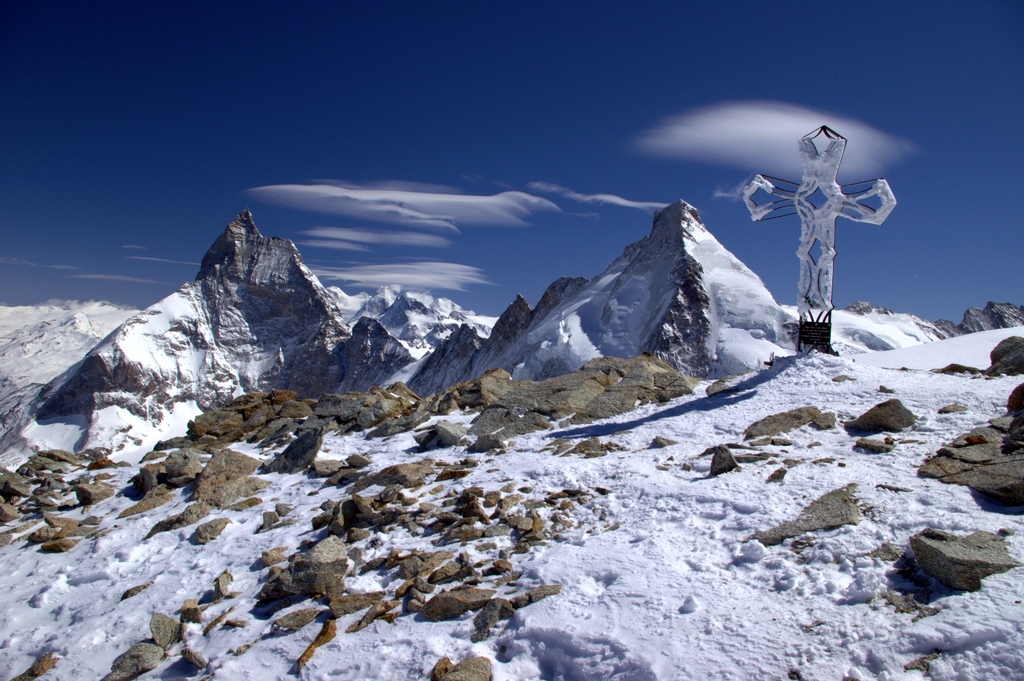
Tête Blanche, near the highest checkpoint

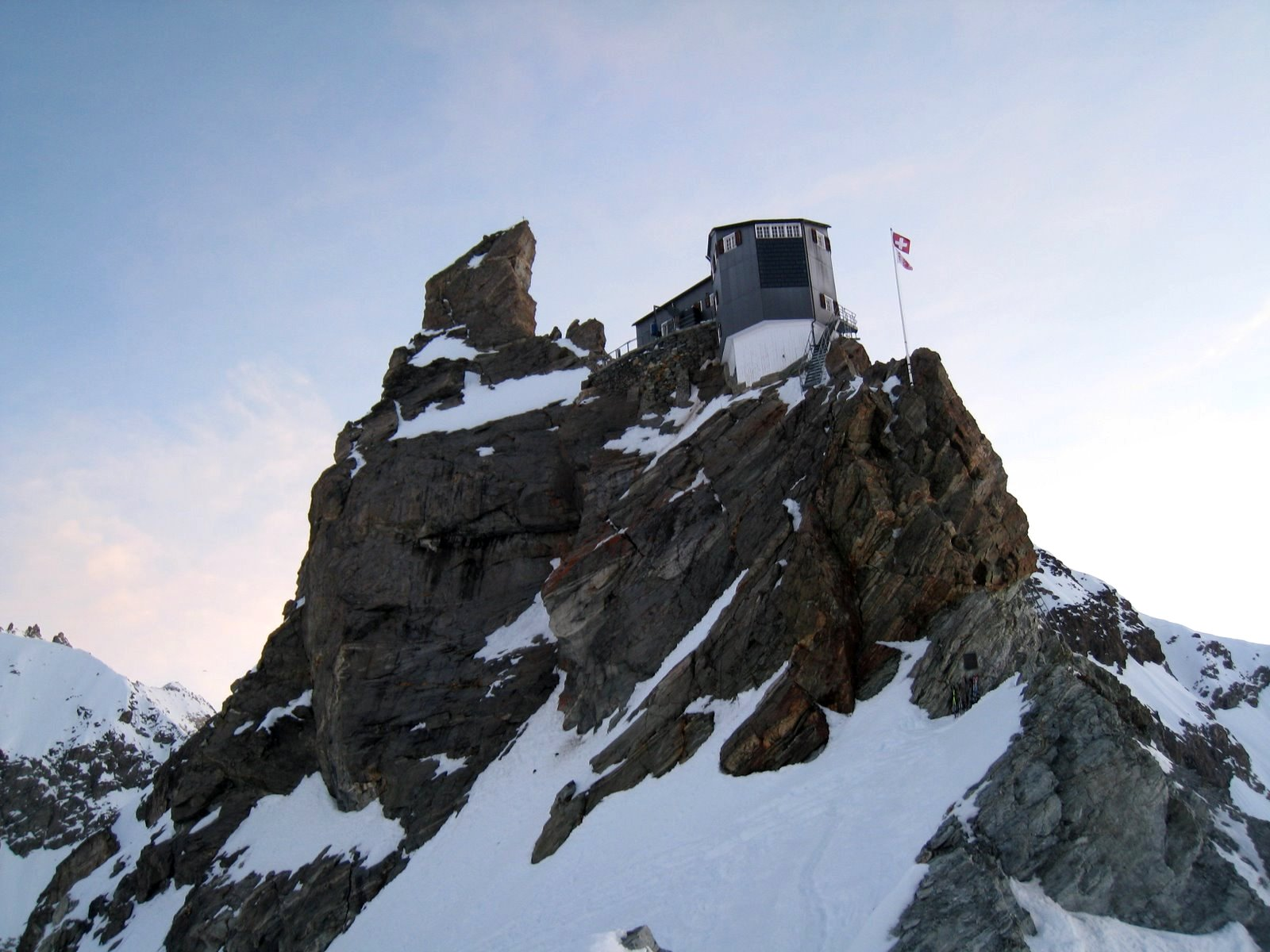
Bertol Hut, above Bertol Pass

The Patrouille des Glaciers (PDG) is a ski mountaineering race organised every two years by the Swiss Armed Forces, in which military and civilian teams compete. It takes place once every two years at the end of April, in the south part of the canton of Valais below the summits of the Pennine Alps.

The Patrouille des Glaciers is a stage of La Grande Course that includes the most important ski mountaineering competitions of the season. There are two different races, a normal and a short one:

- Zermatt – Arolla – Verbier: 57,5 kilometers, altitude difference +4386m and – 4519m. This is equivalent to 110 km without altitude difference.
- Arolla – Verbier: 27 kilometres, altitude difference +1881m and – 2341m. This is equivalent to 53 km without altitude difference.

Each patrol consists of three members who, in order to compete, must

- have alpine experience which ensures their capability to independently master unexpected situations under extreme conditions in an inhospitable high-alpine environment
- train to meet the physical, mental and technical requirements of the competition
- be willing to live the ‘PDG spirit‘ towards their own team, all participants and organising staff by acting fair, with caution and solidarity recognizing their limits as well as respecting nature and the unique alpine world
- have excellent skiing skills, experience in skiing while being roped up to others, experience in alpine touring and mountaineering competitions
- be able to complete the races in the following times, given normal conditions: Zermatt – Schönbiel within 3h; Zermatt – Arolla within 8h 30min; Arolla – Riedmatten within 1h 45 min; Arolla – Verbier within 8h 30 min.

== History ==
The Patrouille des Glaciers has military origins. During the Second World War, the Swiss army organised a race to test the abilities of its soldiers. The first military patrol edition was held in April 1943 thanks to the work of two captains of Mountain Brigade 10 (Rodolphe Tissières and Roger Bonvin). That year, 18 patrols, each consisting of three members, travelled 63 kilometres to reach Verbier. In 1944, 44 teams participated, but for a few years, no races were organized because of war fatigue from the years of military mobilization during World War II. On April 10, 1949, the race was organised once again, but the deaths of three participants from Orsières (Mauritius Crettex, Robert Droz and Louis Thétaz) who died in a crevasse caused a controversy. As a result of that accident the organisation of the race was prohibited by the Federal Military Department until 1984.

The competition was revived by Rene Martin and Camille Bournissen. It remains under the control of the army which ensures its smooth running. The race is now held every two years and is also open to civilians. In 1986, bad weather forced organizers to interrupt the race. In 2002, the same mishap occurred.

In 2004, a non-Swiss team won the race for the first time. The same year, the race was competed by 2934 participants (approximately 60% of civil patrols and 40% military), with 984 for the normal race, and 636 and 1314 for the short races.

In 2006, organisers were forced to refuse a thousand entries. That year a second race was organized from Zermatt for the first time. The media have recently raised the problem of doping: patrols are not subject to any controls which causes rumours about the performance of the participants. The commander of the race, Brigadier Marius Robyr (who retired in 2008), refused to impose controls and instead called for participants to act honestly, and in the spirit of the race in which there is no financial gain for the winners.

On April 18, 2007, memorials donated by the Swiss army were unveiled in Zermatt, Arolla and in Verbier in honour of the communities connected with, benefactors of, and friends of, the PDG. A doping case came to light at the end of the 2008 edition in which ten competitors were checked.

== Records ==
Record times are measured on the longer course only (i.e. from Zermatt to Verbier)

=== Men ===
The record time is 5 h 35'27 by an Italian team winning the 2018 race. Team members were:

- Michele Boscacci
- Robert Antonioli
- Matteo Eydallin

=== Women ===
The record time is 7 h 15'35 by a French/Swiss team from the 2018 race. Team members were:

- Axelle Mollaret
- Laetitia Roux
- Jennifer Fiechter

== Checkpoints ==
Several supply and control stations are located between Zermatt and Verbier:

Name	Distance from Zermatt	Altitude
Zermatt	0 km	1616 m
South of Schönbiel Hut	8 km	2600 m
North of Tête Blanche	16 km	3650 m
Bertol Pass	20 km	3279 m
Plans de Bertol	23 km	2664 m
Arolla	28 km	1980 m
Col de Riedmatten	33 km	2919 m
Pas du Chat	35 km	2581 m
La Barma	38 km	2581 m
Rosablanche	43 km	3160 m
Col de la Chaux	47 km	2940 m
Les Ruinettes	49 km	2195 m
Verbier	53 km	1520 m

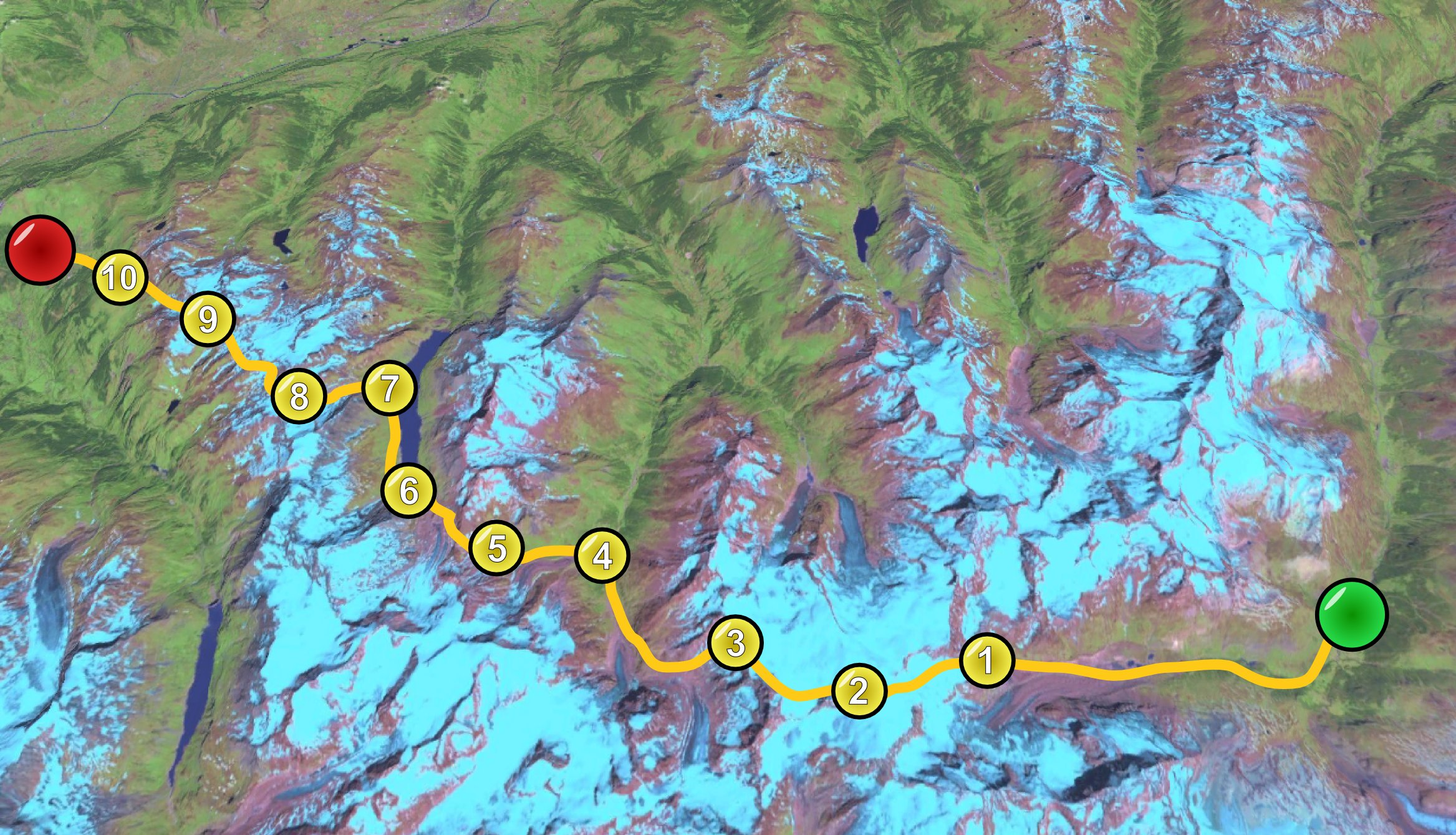

Green : Zermatt (start)

Red : Verbier (end)

1. Schönbiel
2. Tête blanche
3. Bertol Pass
4. Arolla
5. Col de Riedmatten
6. Pas du chat
7. La Barma
8. Rosablanche
9. Col de la Chaux
10. Les Ruinettes

The total drop is 4386 meters (ascent) and 4519 meters (descent).

== Rules ==
Participants are divided into two groups: civilians and military. The categories are (Regulation 2006):

- Female civilian patrols
- Male or mixed civilian patrols
  - Senior I (total age of three members less than 102 years)
  - Senior II (total age of three members between 103 and 132 years)
  - Senior III (patrols remaining)
- Female military patrols
- International military patrols (only for normal race)
- Swiss military patrols
  - Military I (total age of three members less than 102 years)
  - Military II (total age of three members between 103 and 132 years)
  - Military III (patrols remaining)
- Female international civilian patrols (only short race)
- Male international civilian patrols (only short race)

== Material ==
Each patrol must be equipped with the following equipment (Regulation 2006):

- Ice axe
- compass, altimeter
- three climbing harnesses
- pairs of gloves, hats, bags
- a Rope of at least 30 meters, snow shovel
- skis
- three headlamps, first aid kit, glasses
- Avalanche transceiver

== See also ==
- Haute Route
