= Pointe de Bertol =

Mountain in Switzerland

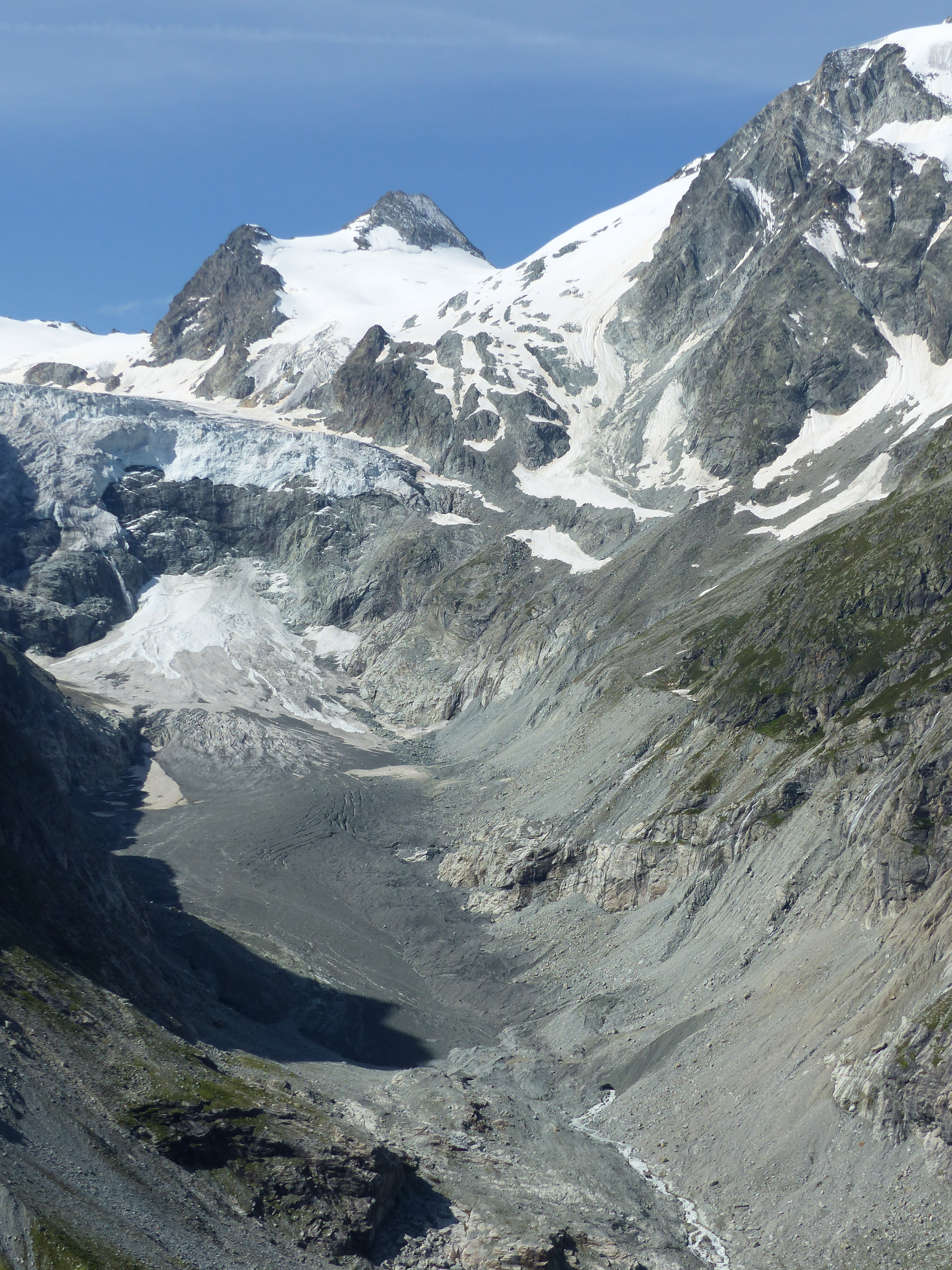
- Pointe de Bertol with Glacier du Mont Miné

Highest point
- Elevation: 3,499 m (11,480 ft)
- Prominence: 190 m (620 ft)
- Parent peak: Dent de Perroc
- Coordinates: 46°0′34.7″N 7°31′41.5″E

Geography
- Location within Switzerland
- Location: Valais, Switzerland
- Parent range: Pennine Alps

The Pointe de Bertol (3,499 m (11,480 ft)) is a mountain of the Swiss Pennine Alps, located south of Arolla in the canton of Valais. Its southern side overlooks the Bertol Pass.

The Bertol Hut (3,311 m (10,863 ft)) is located at the southern base of the peak.
