= Col de Chermotane =

Mountain pass in Valais, Switzerland

- Location within Switzerland
- Elevation: 3,037 metres (9,964 ft)
- Traversed by: Glacier

Third Approach
- Location: Valais, Switzerland
- Range: Pennine Alps
- Coordinates: 45°58′42″N 7°28′23″E

The Col de Chermotane (also known as Col de Charmotane) is an Alpine pass located in the Swiss canton of Valais. With an elevation of 3,037 metres above sea level, the Col de Chermotane is the lowest pass between the valleys of Bagnes and Hérens. The pass lies a few kilometres north of the main chain of the Alps and is covered by the Otemma Glacier. It connects Chanrion to Arolla, both in the upper part of their valley.

The pass is located between the Pigne d'Arolla (north) and the Petit Mont Collon (south).
