= Vignettes Hut =

Mountain hut in the Swiss Alps

Coordinates: 45°59′23.5″N 7°28′32″E

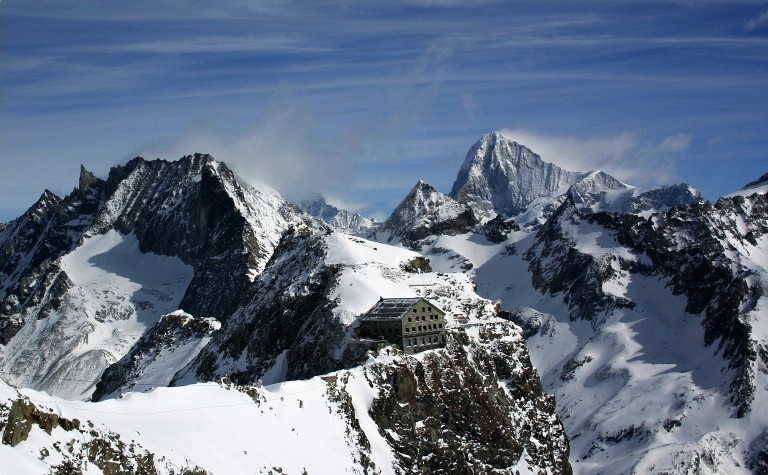
Vignettes Hut with Aiguille de la Tsa (left) and Dent Blanche (right)

The Vignettes Hut (French: Cabane des Vignettes) is an alpine hut, located south of Arolla in the Swiss canton of Valais. It lies at a height of 3,160 metres above sea level, at the foot of the Pigne d'Arolla and near the Col de Chermotane in the Pennine Alps. All accesses to the hut involve glacier crossing.

The Cabane de Vignettes is a famous stop for those that walk or ski the Haute Route, Chamonix–Zermatt. This Haute Route was first established on foot in 1861 by English mountaineers.

== History ==
A bivouac was built at the site in 1924 on the initiative of the English alpinist Stuart Jenkins, and the current building was built at the same location in 1946.

== See also ==
- List of buildings and structures above 3000 m in Switzerland
