= Pointe d'Otemma =

Mountain in Switzerland

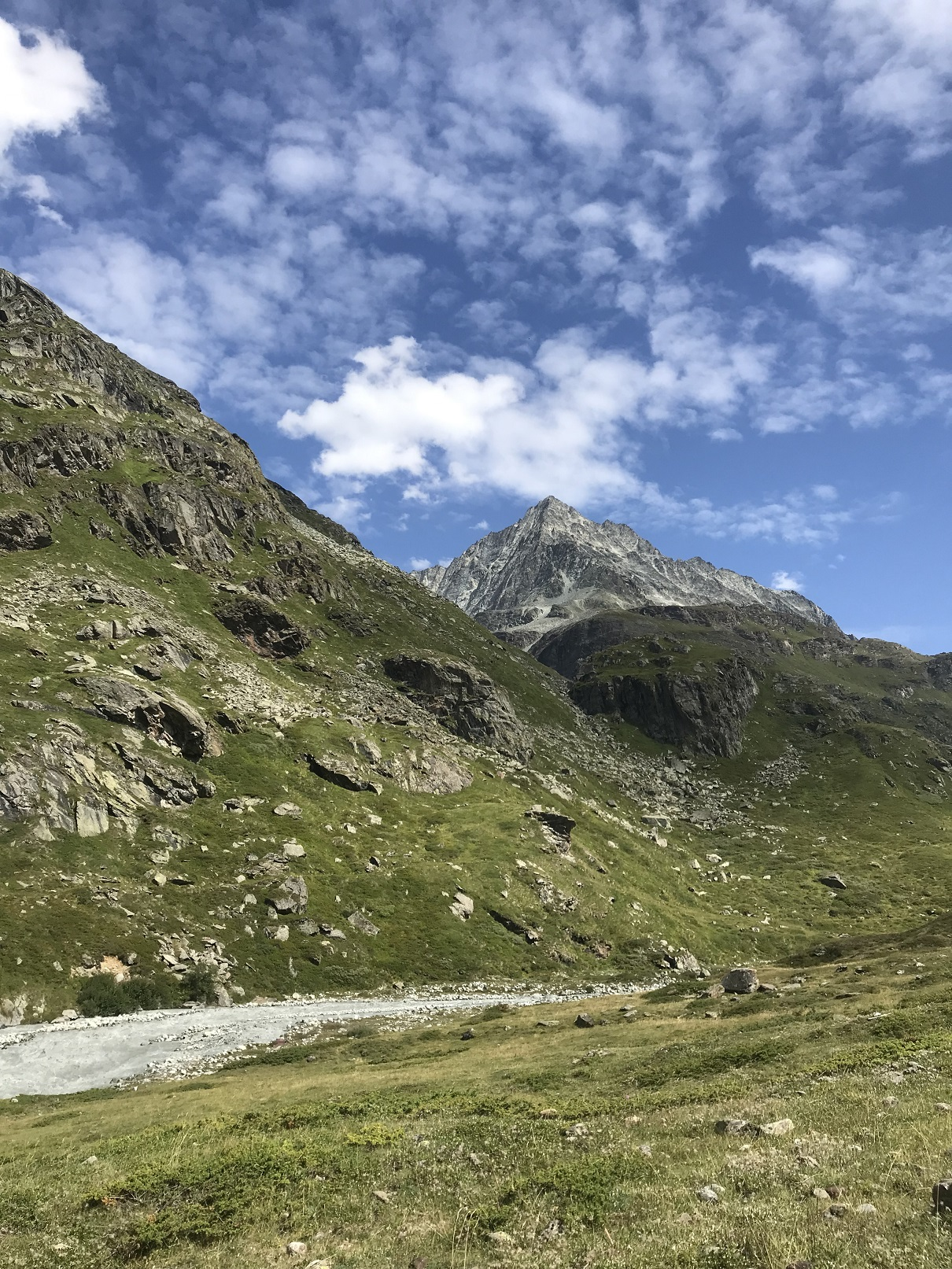
- Pointe d'Otemma on summer 2023.

Highest point
- Elevation: 3,403 m (11,165 ft)
- Prominence: 224 m (735 ft)
- Parent peak: Pigne d'Arolla
- Coordinates: 45°56′36.6″N 7°23′52″E

Geography
- Location within Switzerland
- Location: Valais, Switzerland
- Parent range: Pennine Alps

The Pointe d'Otemma is a mountain of the Swiss Pennine Alps, located south of the lake of Mauvoisin in the canton of Valais. It lies at western end of the chain separating the Brenay Glacier from the Otemma Glacier.

On the west side of the mountain lies the Chanrion Hut. The closest locality in the valley is Fionnay.
