= Bec d'Epicoune =

Mountain of the Pennine Alps

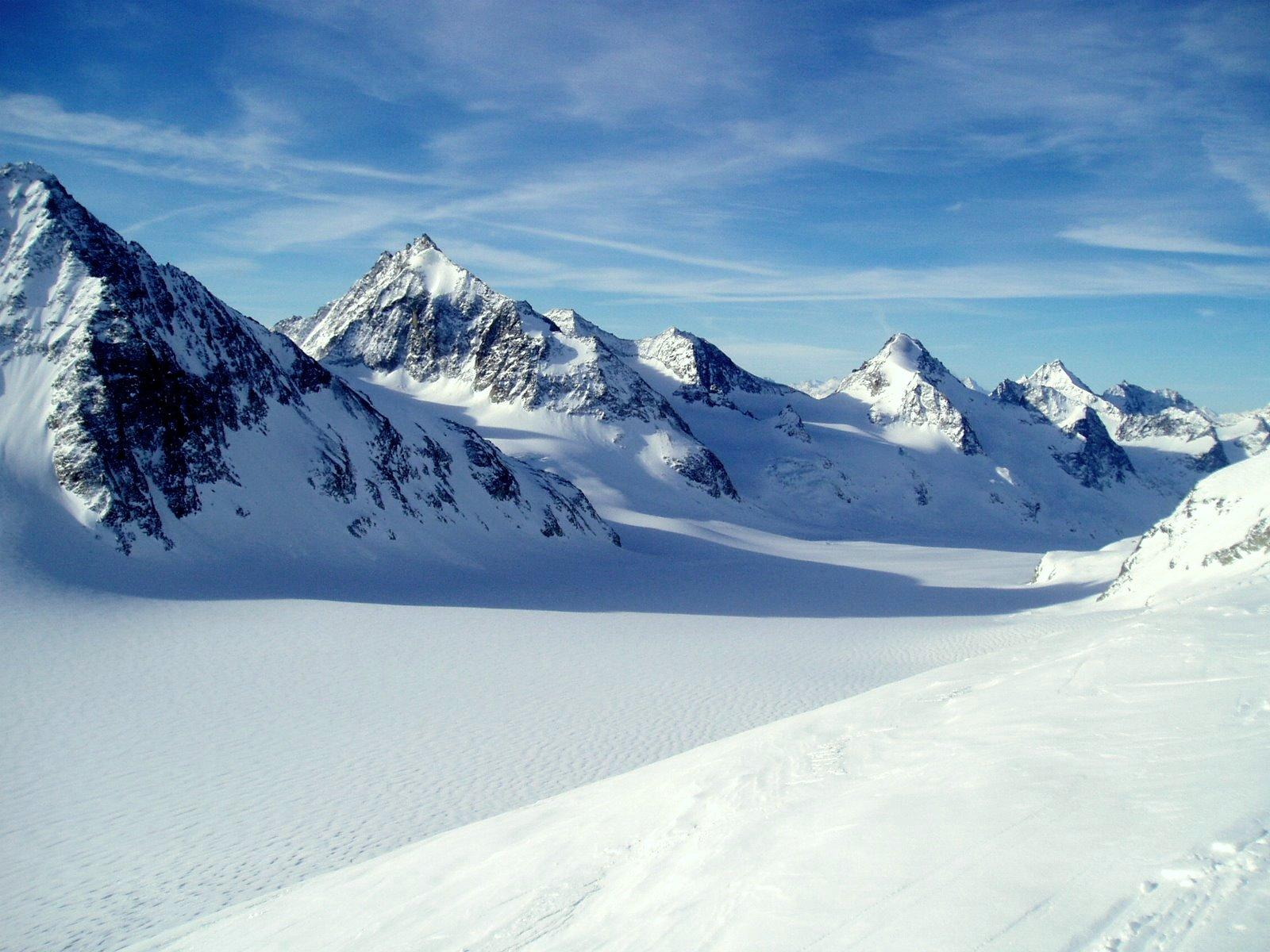
- Bec d'Epicoune (far right) from the Otemma Glacier

Highest point
- Elevation: 3,531 m (11,585 ft)
- Prominence: 298 m (978 ft)
- Parent peak: Aouille Tseuque
- Listing: Alpine mountains above 3000 m
- Coordinates: 45°54′52.6″N 7°25′20.8″E

Geography
- Location within Alps
- Location: Valais, Switzerland/Aosta Valley, Italy
- Parent range: Pennine Alps

Climbing
- First ascent: 21 July 1866 by Johann Jakob Weilenmann and Joseph Gillioz

Bec d'Epicoune or Becca Rayette is a mountain of the Pennine Alps, located on the Swiss-Italian border. On its northern side it overlooks the Otemma Glacier. On the Swisstopo map, Becca Rayette is the name of a 3,432 m sub-peak on the SW spur neighboring the 3,320 m Col de la Rayette, rather than an alternative name for the main summit. Likewise, Becca Picion is a 3,389 sub-summit on the ENE ridge towards the 3,233 m Col d'Epicoune.
