= Bertol Hut =

Coordinates: 46°0′22″N 7°31′39″E

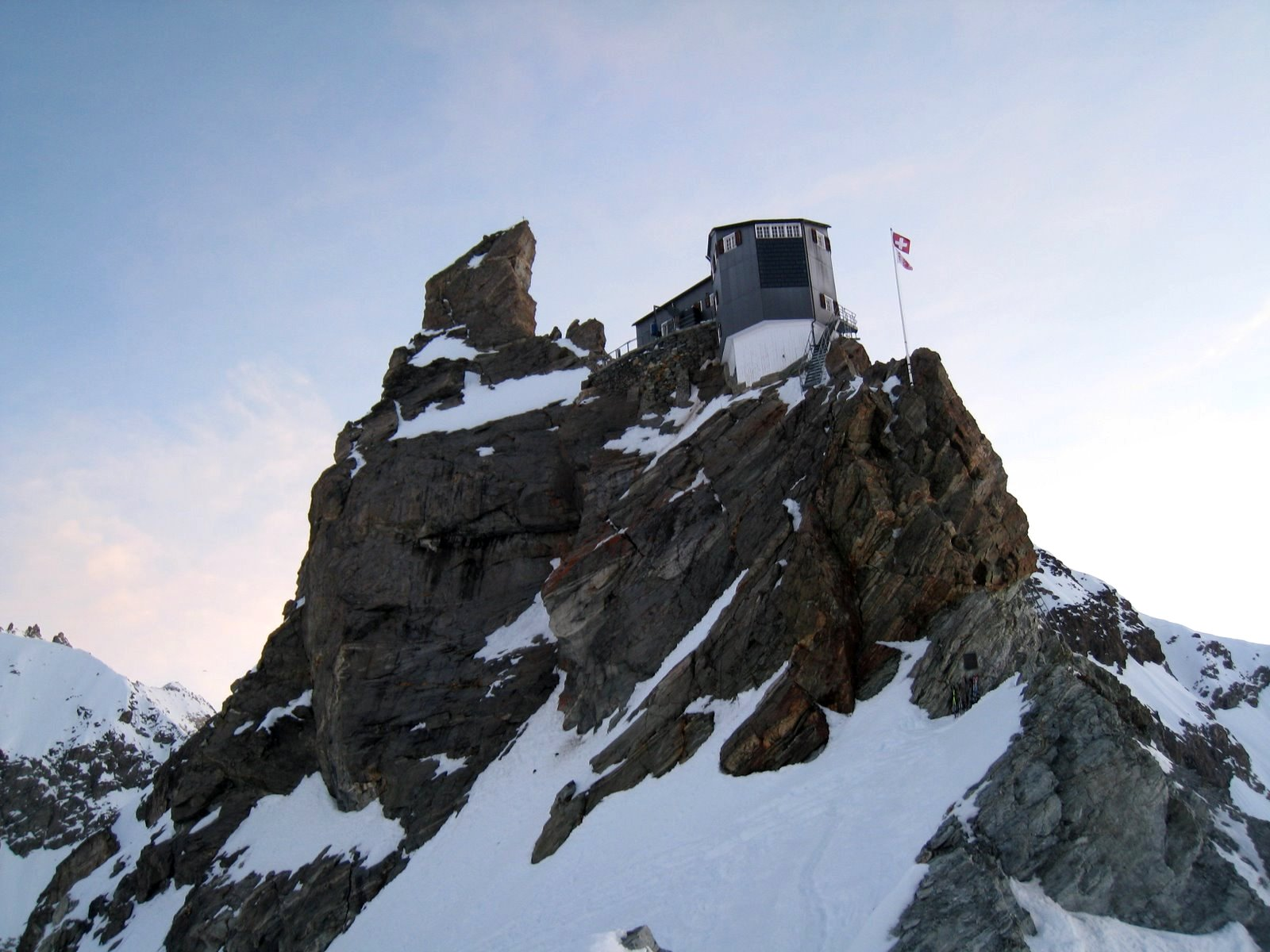
The Bertol Hut from the pass

The Bertol Hut (French: Cabane de Bertol) is a mountain hut overlooking the Bertol Pass, south of Arolla in the Swiss canton of Valais. It is known for its precarious position on a ridge at 3,311 metres (10,863 ft) south of the Pointe de Bertol and is accessed by a number of fixed ladders and chains from the glacier pass (3,268 m). All accesses to the hut involve glacier crossing. On its east side it overlooks the large plateau of the Mont Miné Glacier.

The Bertol Hut is situated on the Haute Route from Chamonix to Zermatt. Nearby peaks include the Dent Blanche, Aiguille de la Tsa and Tête Blanche.

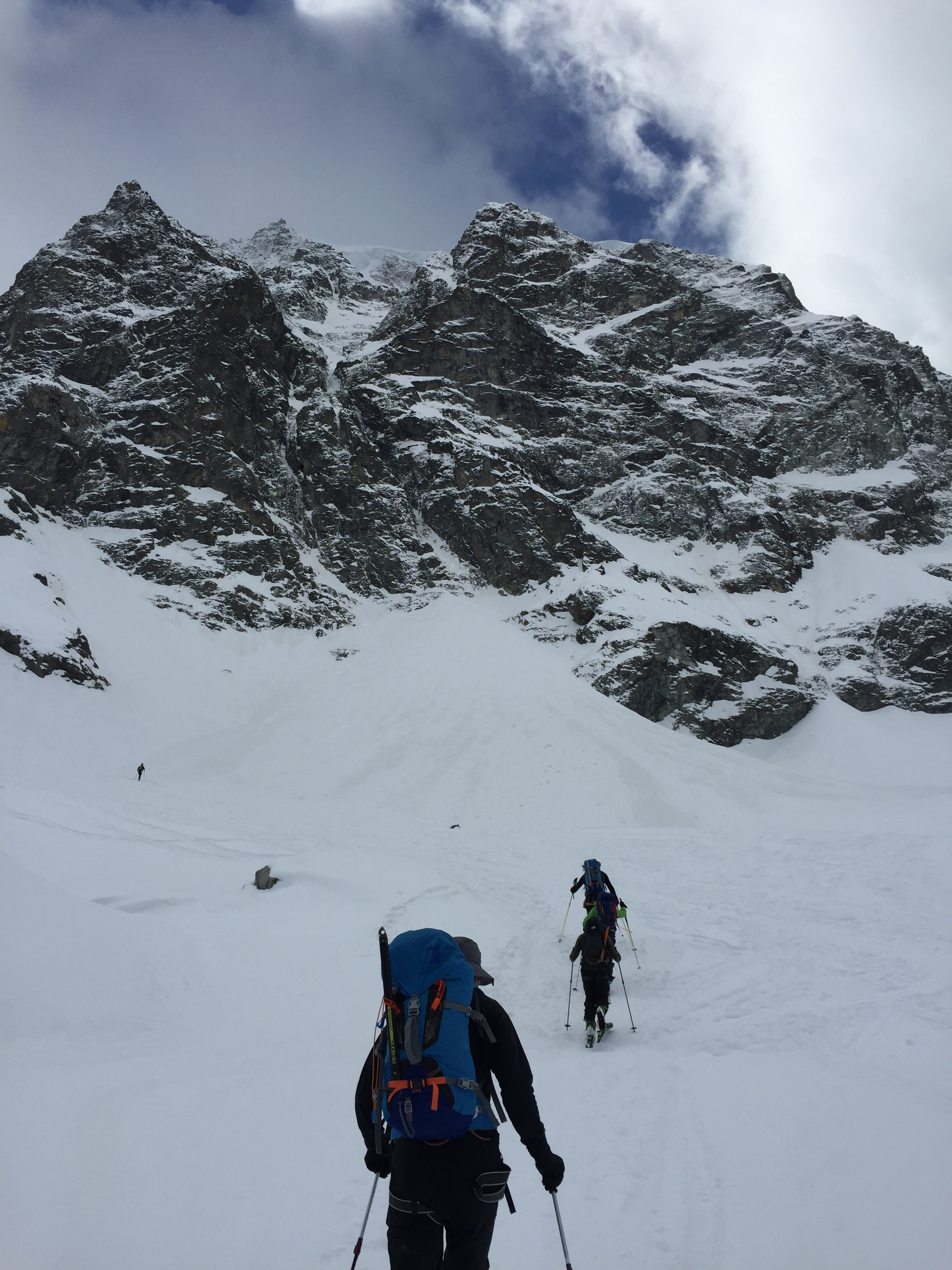
Ascent to the Bertol Hut

== See also ==
- List of buildings and structures above 3000 m in Switzerland
