= La Serpentine =

Mountain in Switzerland

- Aerial view of La Serpentine (to the right of center)

Highest point
- Elevation: 3,713 m (12,182 ft)
- Prominence: 247 m (810 ft)
- Parent peak: La Ruinette
- Coordinates: 45°58′37.86″N 7°25′37.79″E

Geography
- Location within Switzerland
- Location: Valais, Switzerland
- Parent range: Pennine Alps

La Serpentine (3,713 m) is a mountain of the Swiss Pennine Alps, located south of Arolla in the canton of Valais. It lies west of the Pigne d'Arolla, on the range between the valley of Bagnes and the valley of Arolla.
