= Petit Mont Collon =

Mountain in Switzerland

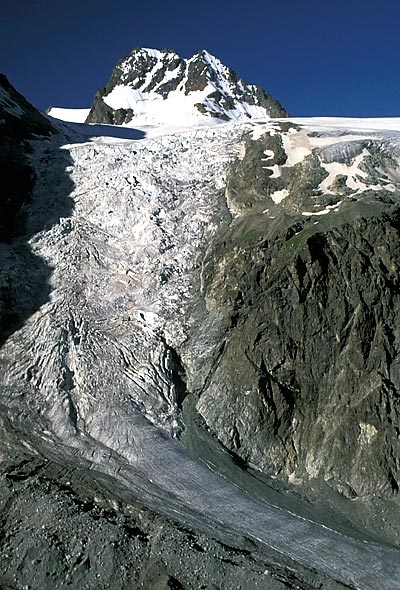
- Above the Arolla Glacier

Highest point
- Elevation: 3,555 m (11,663 ft)
- Prominence: 271 m (889 ft)
- Parent peak: L'Evêque
- Coordinates: 45°58′4″N 7°28′52″E

Geography
- Location within Switzerland
- Location: Valais, Switzerland
- Parent range: Pennine Alps

The Petit Mont Collon is a mountain of the Swiss Pennine Alps, located south of Arolla in the canton of Valais. It lies south of the Col de Chermotane and west of Mont Collon.
