= Aiguille de la Tsa =

Mountain in Switzerland

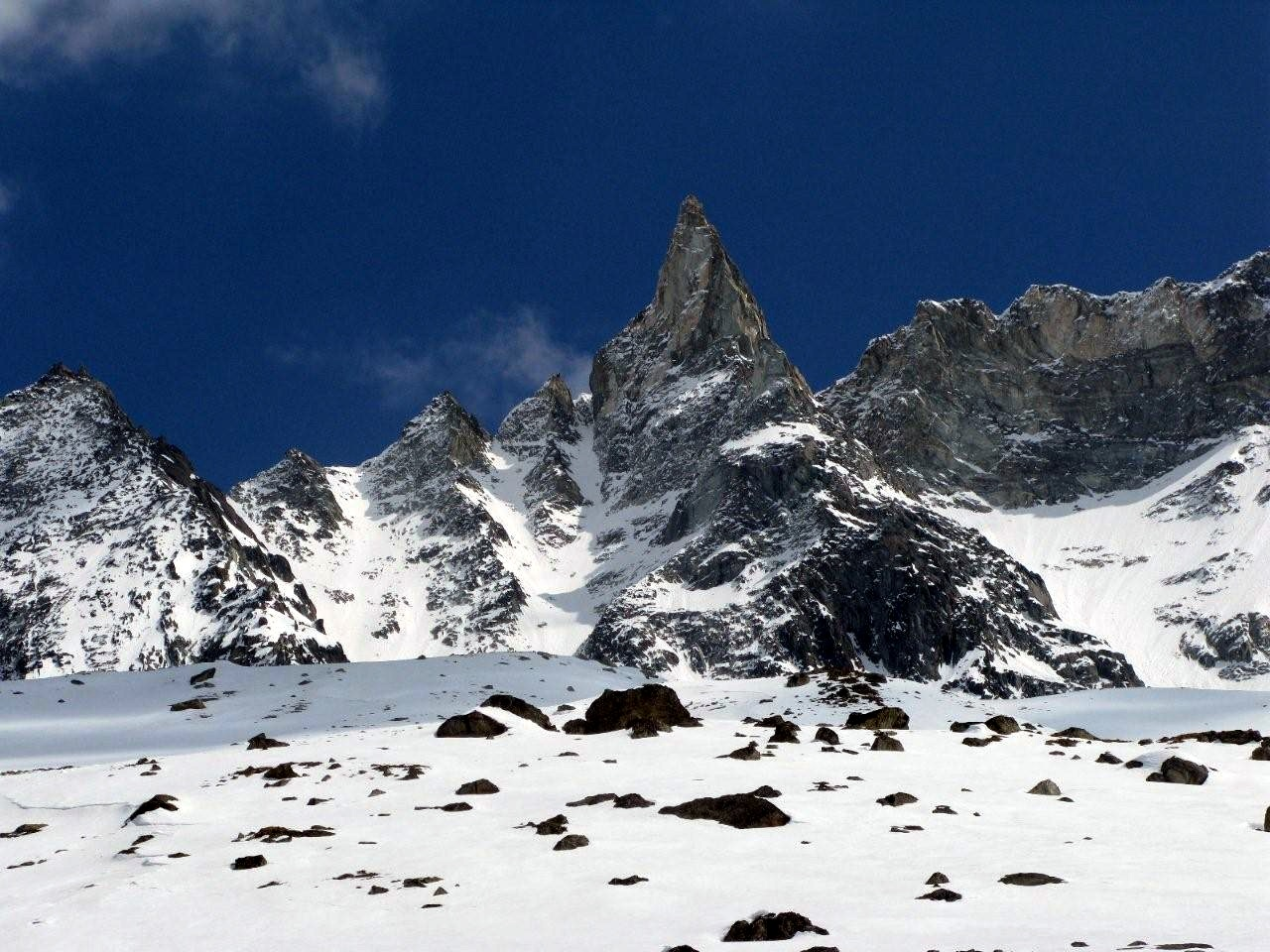
- Aiguille de la Tsa from the west side

Highest point
- Elevation: 3,668 m (12,034 ft)
- Prominence: 251 m (823 ft)
- Parent peak: Dent de Perroc
- Coordinates: 46°01′17″N 07°31′20″E

Geography
- Location within Switzerland
- Location: Valais, Switzerland
- Parent range: Pennine Alps

The Aiguille de la Tsa is a mountain of the Swiss Pennine Alps, overlooking Arolla in the canton of Valais. It lies on the range culminating at the Dent de Perroc, between the valley of Arolla and the Mont Miné Glacier.
