= Schönbiel Hut =

Coordinates: 46°00′07″N 7°37′44″E

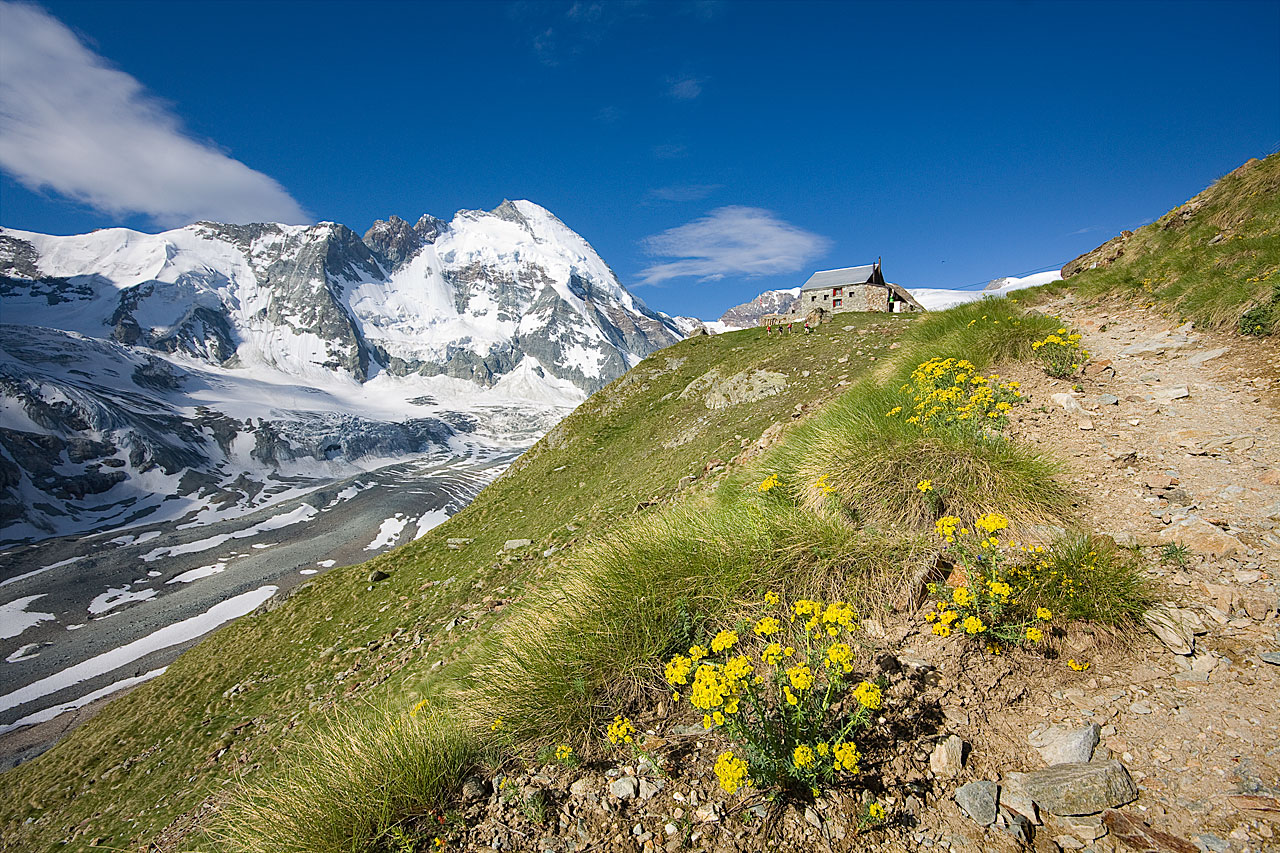
The Schönbiel Hut and Dent d'Hérens

The Schönbiel Hut (German: Schönbielhütte) is a mountain hut located north of the Matterhorn. It is situated at 2,694 metres (8,839 ft) above sea level, north of the Zmutt Glacier, a few kilometers west of the town of Zermatt in the canton of Valais in Switzerland. The actual hut was built by the Swiss Alpine Club in 1955, after the demolition of an older hut, built in 1909.

The hut is accessible to hikers, from the cable car station of Schwarzsee with a marked trail. It is used to climb the Matterhorn on Zmutt ridge and many other high summits in the area (Dent d'Hérens, Dent Blanche, Ober Gabelhorn, Tête Blanche).
