= Dix Hut =

Coordinates: 46°00′40″N 7°25′04″E

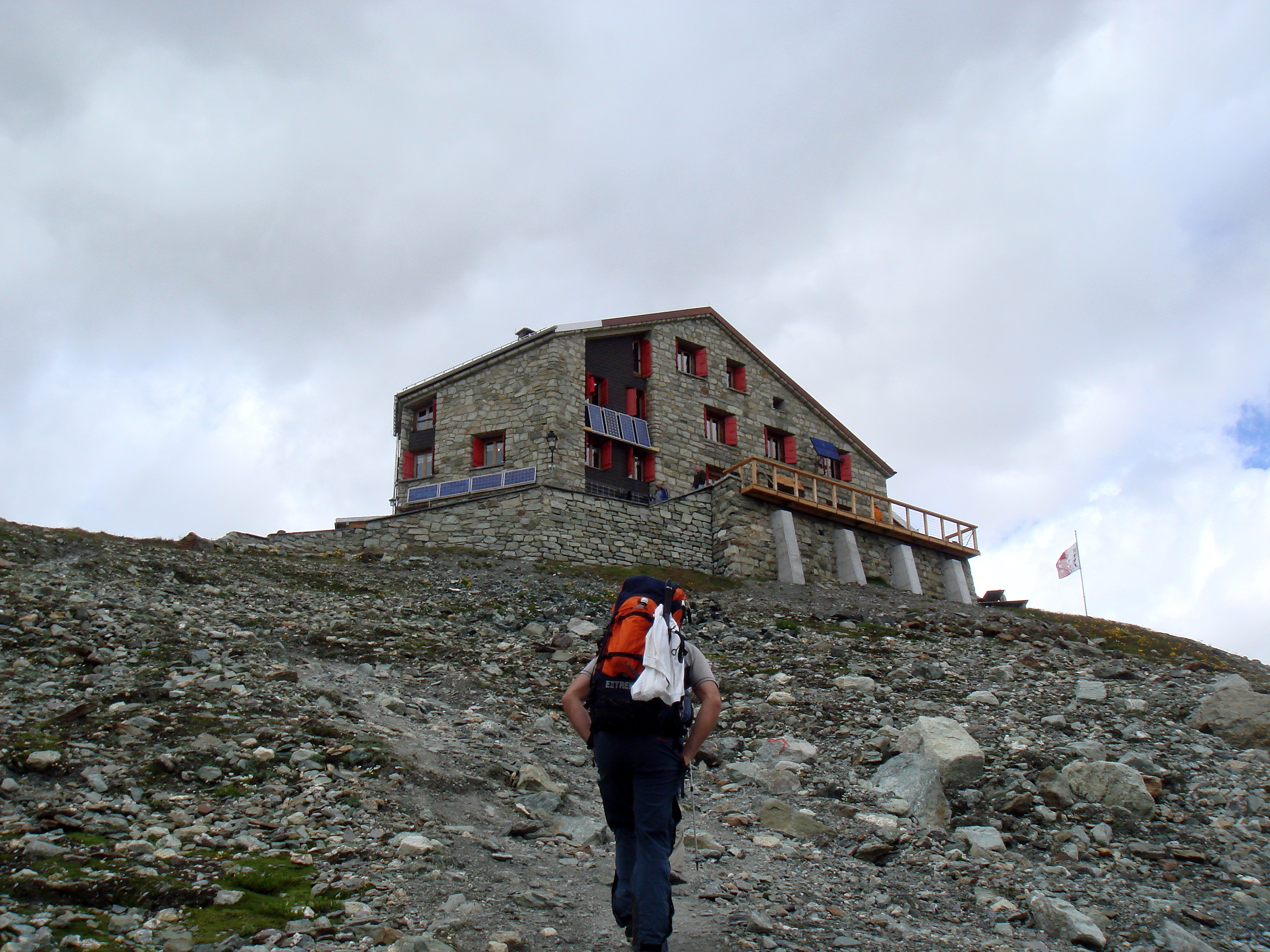
The Dix Hut

The Dix Hut (French: Cabane des Dix) is a mountain hut of the Swiss Alpine Club, located south of Hérémence in the canton of Valais. The hut lies above the Cheilon Glacier, at a height of 2,928 metres above sea level, approximately halfway between the Lac des Dix and the Mont Blanc de Cheilon.

The Dix Hut is the starting point of the ascents of Mont Blanc de Cheilon, Pigne d'Arolla and La Luette. The shortest accesses to the hut are from Arolla (via the Chèvres/Riedmatten Pass) and from the Grande Dixence Dam.
