= Dent de Perroc =

Mountain in Switzerland

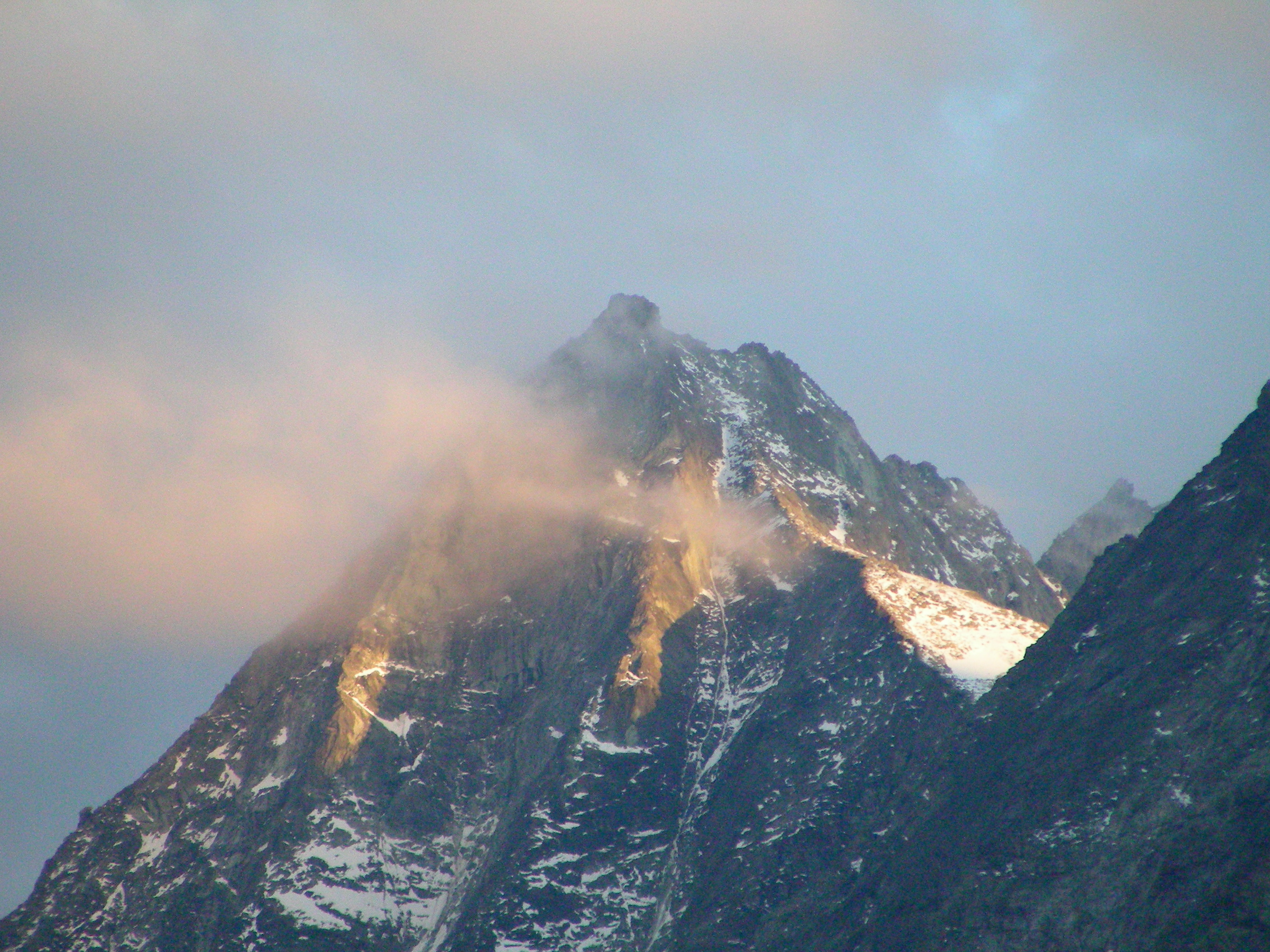
- View from Evolène (north side)

Highest point
- Elevation: 3,676 m (12,060 ft)
- Prominence: 408 m (1,339 ft)
- Parent peak: Monte Rosa
- Listing: Alpine mountains above 3000 m
- Coordinates: 46°02′23″N 7°31′24″E

Geography
- Location within Switzerland
- Location: Valais, Switzerland
- Parent range: Pennine Alps

The Dent de Perroc is a mountain of the Swiss Pennine Alps, overlooking Arolla in the canton of Valais. With an elevation of 3,676 metres above sea level, the Dent de Perroc is one of the highest summit of the range separating the valley of Arolla on the west side from the valley of the Mont Miné Glacier on the east side.

== See also ==
- List of mountains of Switzerland
