= La Grande Course =

Ski mountaineering competition

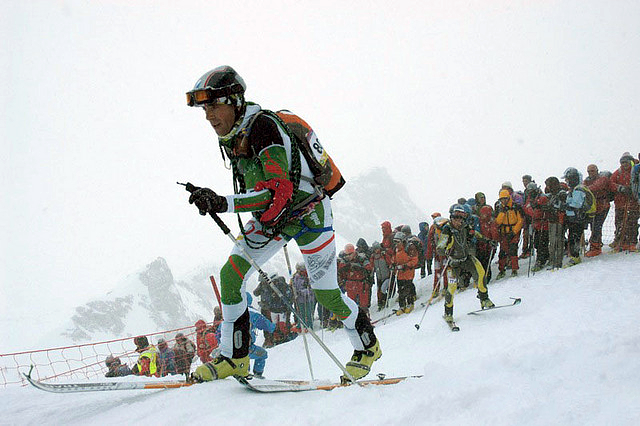
2008 Adamello Ski Raid

La Grande Course is an international competition of ski mountaineering in stages. It includes the most important competitions of the season for teams of two or three competitors.

As of 2015 the senior events of La Grande Course represented a total length of 355 km and 38 km in altitude, but not all events are run every year. There are also six races on specific trails aimed at the cadet (15-16-17 years) and junior categories (18-19-20 years) that compete in teams of two.

Starting in the 2014/15 ski mountaineering season the La Grande Course events are integrated into the International Ski Mountaineering Federation (ISMF) competition calendar, as the Long Distance Team events for the ISMF World Cup.

== Events ==
=== Every year ===
- Pierra Menta, France, four-day race, teams of two
- Altitoy Ternua, France, two-day race, teams of two

=== Even-numbered years (e.g. 2016 and 2018) ===
- Tour du Rutor, Italy, three-day race, teams of two
- Patrouille des Glaciers, Switzerland, four-day race, teams of three

=== Odd-numbered years (e.g. 2017 and 2019) ===
- Adamello Ski Raid, Italy, teams by two
- Mezzalama Trophy, Italy, teams of three
