= Punta Maria Cristina =

Mountain in Italy and Switzerland

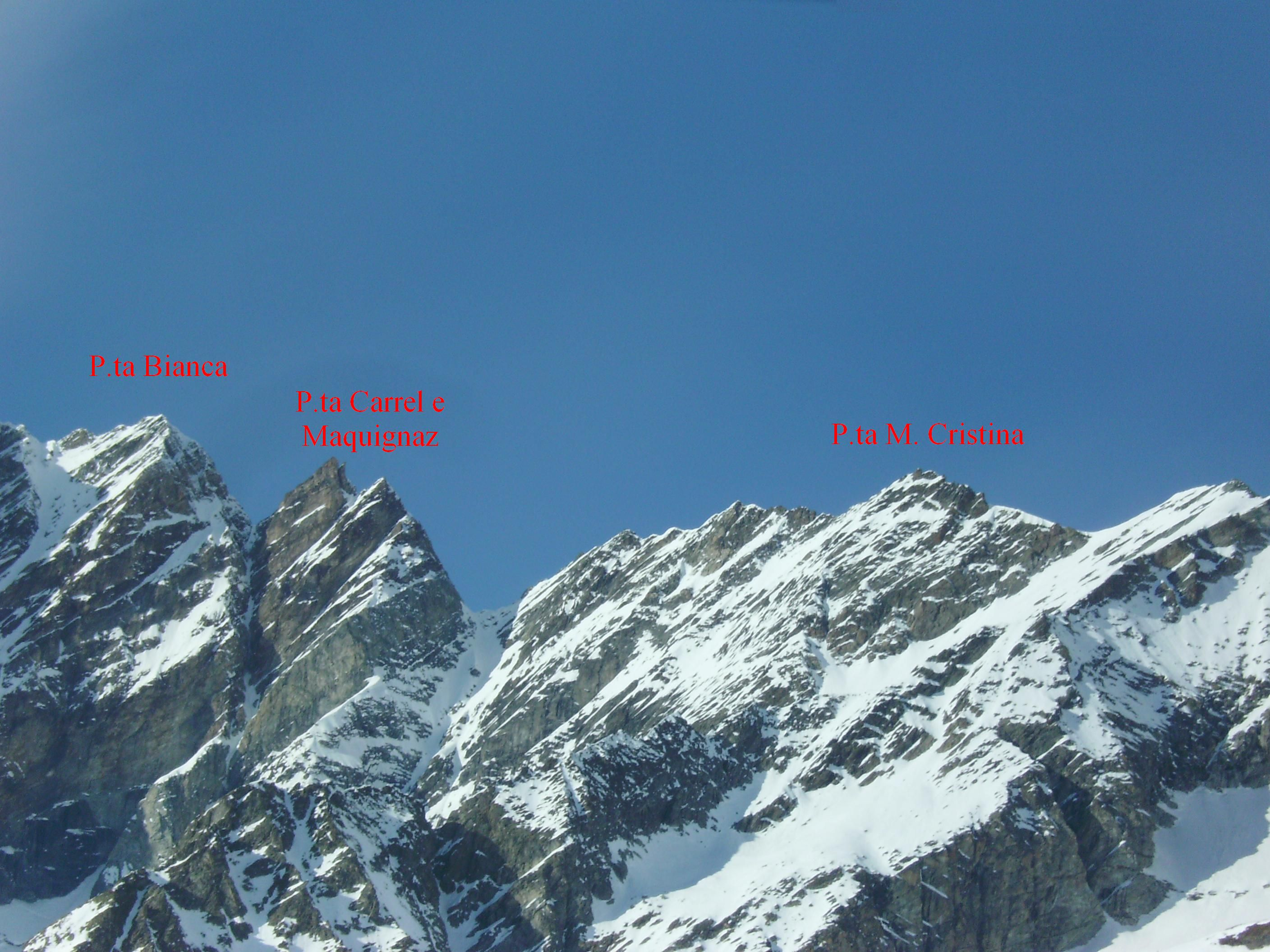
- View from the south side

Highest point
- Elevation: 3,706 m (12,159 ft)
- Prominence: 71 m (233 ft)
- Parent peak: Dent d'Hérens
- Coordinates: 45°58′20″N 7°37′13″E

Geography
- Location within Alps
- Location: Valais, Switzerland; Aosta Valley, Italy
- Parent range: Pennine Alps

The Punta Maria Cristina (lit. 'Maria Cristina Peak') is a mountain (3,706 m) of the Pennine Alps, located on the Swiss-Italian border. It lies on the main Alpine watershed, between the Dent d'Hérens and the Matterhorn.

On the summit is the permanent bivouac shelter named Giorgio e Renzo Novella, dedicated in 1983 to the Novella Brothers from Vercelli, who both died while mountain-climbing.
