= Aouille Tseuque =

Mountain in Switzerland

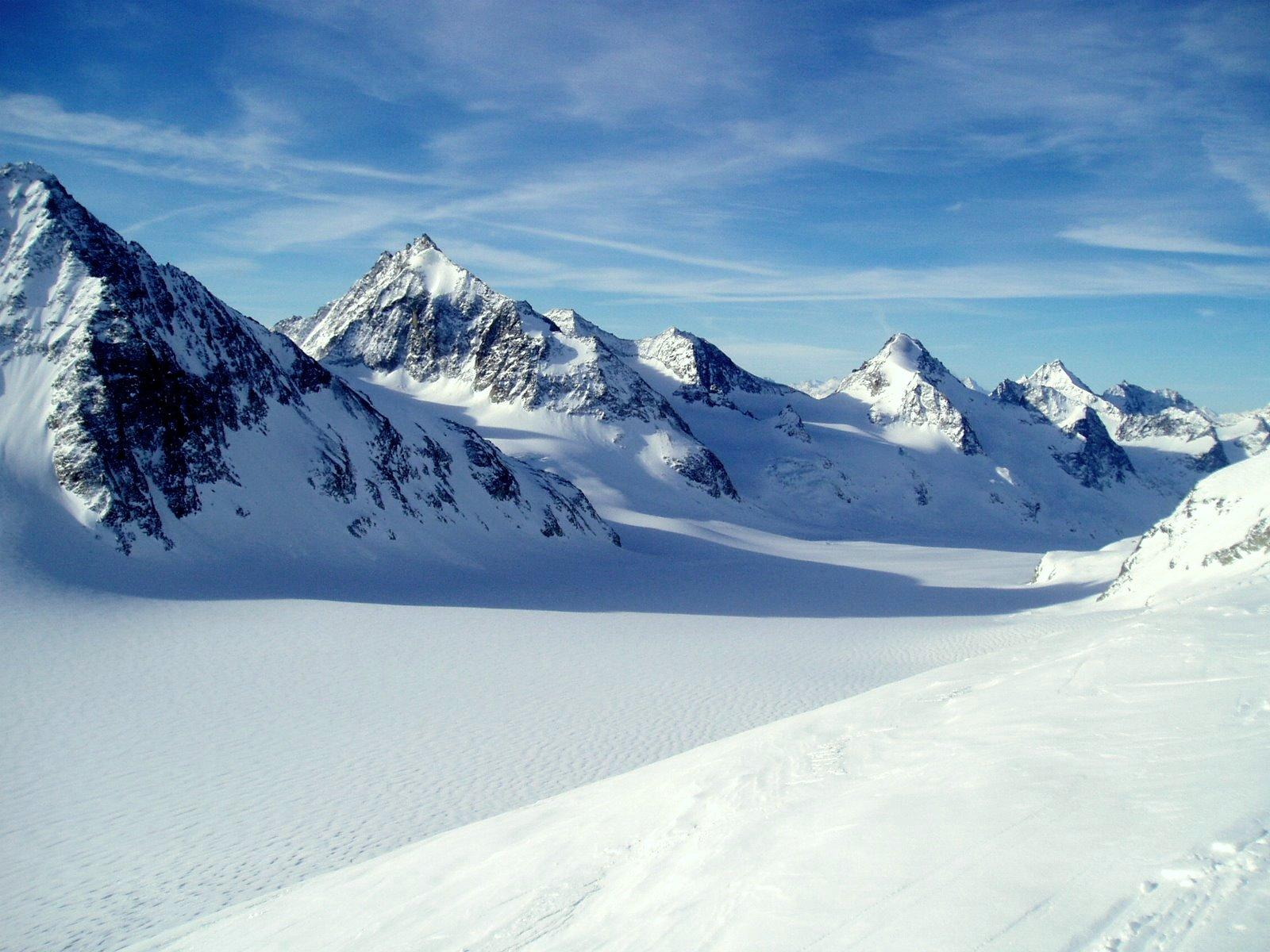
- Aouille Tseuque (centre right)

Highest point
- Elevation: 3,554 m (11,660 ft)
- Prominence: 345 m (1,132 ft)
- Parent peak: L'Evêque
- Listing: Alpine mountains above 3000 m
- Coordinates: 45°55′50.1″N 7°26′35.3″E

Geography
- Location within Alps
- Location: Valais, Switzerland/Aosta Valley, Italy
- Parent range: Pennine Alps

Aouille Tseuque is a mountain of the Pennine Alps on the Swiss-Italian border. On its northern side it overlooks the Otemma Glacier.
