= Tête Blanche =

Mountain in Switzerland

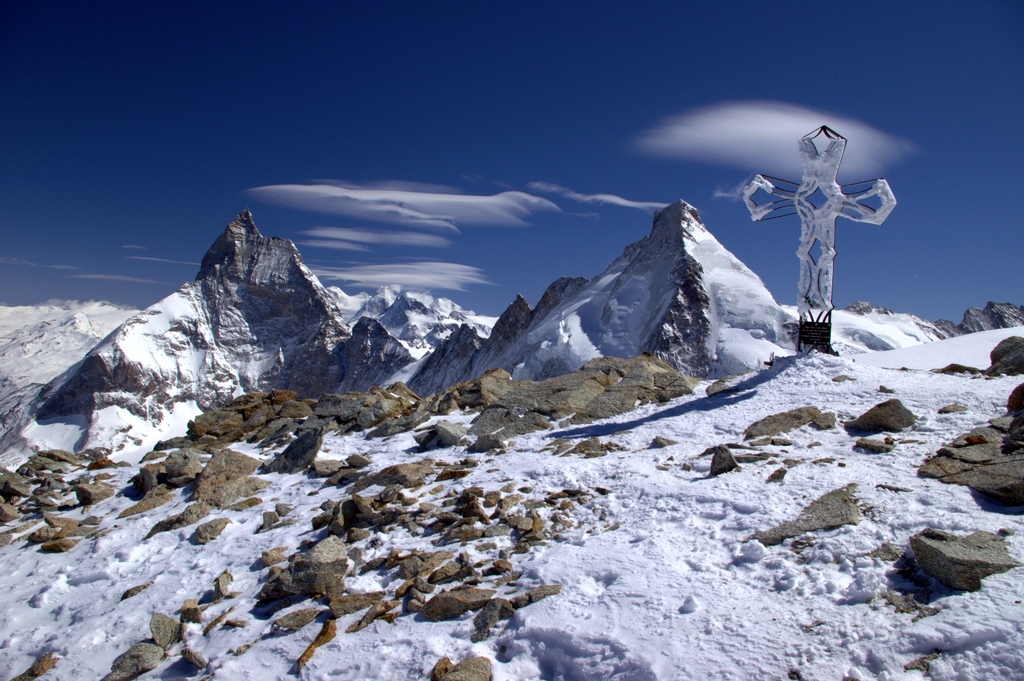
- View from the summit over the Matterhorn (left) and Dent d'Hérens (right)

Highest point
- Elevation: 3,710 m (12,170 ft)
- Prominence: 159 m (522 ft)
- Parent peak: Dent d'Hérens
- Coordinates: 45°59′14.7″N 7°34′29.5″E

Geography
- Location within Alps
- Location: Valais, Switzerland; Aosta Valley, Italy
- Parent range: Pennine Alps

Tête Blanche (French pronunciation: [tɛt blɑ̃ʃ], lit. 'White Head') is a mountain of the Pennine Alps on the Swiss-Italian border. Its summit (3,710 metres) is the tripoint between the valleys of Hérens, Mattertal (both in Valais) and Valpelline (in the Aosta Valley), thus forming the linguistic tri-point between French (Val d'Hérens and Aosta Valley), German (Mattertal), and Italian (bilingual Aosta Valley) -speaking areas.

Tête Blanche is generally the high point of the Haute route between Chamonix and Zermatt and the annual race Patrouille des Glaciers. Tête Blanche lies within a few kilometres of the Matterhorn and Dent d'Hérens on the east.
