= Haute Route (cycling) =

Series of multi-day cyclosportive events

Haute Route Cycling Series is a series of multi-day cyclosportive events held on mountain roads around the world. It was founded by Michael Hartweg.

== Events ==
The flagship event is the Haute Route Alps, a seven-day, approximately 800 km event.as of 2025 The route and direction change from year to year; it ran from Megève to Nice in 2025, and was scheduled to run from Nice to Thonon-les-Bains in 2026.

Other events in the series have included five-day events, the Haute Route Pyrenees (Girona to Pau) and Haute Route Dolomites (Cortina d'Ampezzo to Bormio), and three-day events in Crans-Montana, Ventoux and Florianópolis.

== Ownership ==
In February 2021, the Haute Route Group bought the Gravel Epic and Race Across France. In August 2021, the Haute Route Group was purchased by the Ironman Group.
