= Valsorey Hut =

Coordinates: 45°55′49″N 7°16′18″E

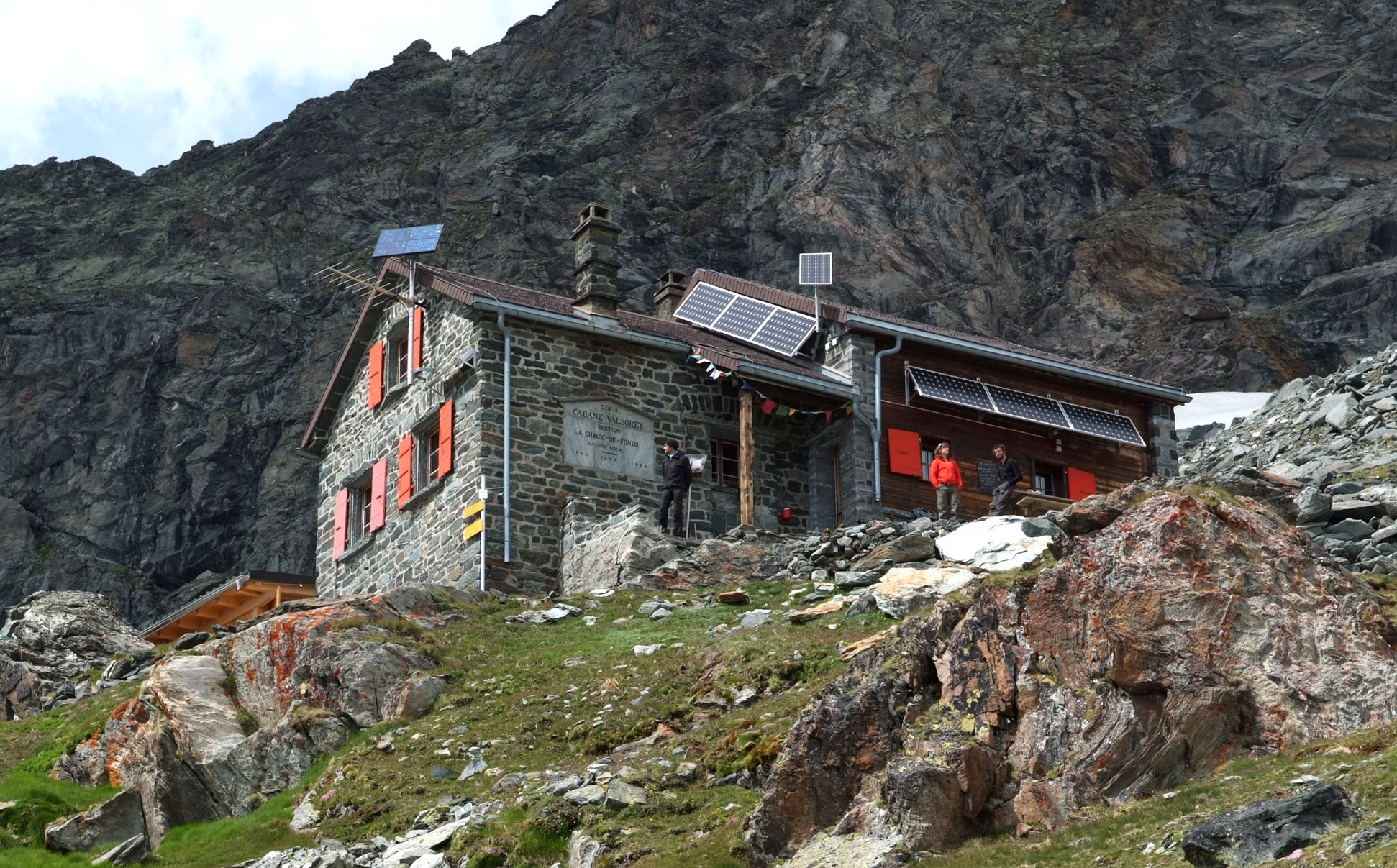
The Valsorey Hut

The Valsorey Hut (French: Cabane de Valsorey) is a mountain hut of the Swiss Alpine Club, located south of Bourg-Saint-Pierre in the canton of Valais. The hut lies at a height of 3,030 metres above sea level, on the southwestern slopes of the Grand Combin in the Pennine Alps, facing Mont Vélan.

The Valsorey hut is the start of the route to the summit of the Grand Combin from the Meitin ridge or from the south face as well as other summits of the massif. The easiest access is from Bourg-Saint-Pierre where a trail leads to the hut.

== See also ==
- List of buildings and structures above 3000 m in Switzerland
