= Rosablanche =

Mountain in Switzerland

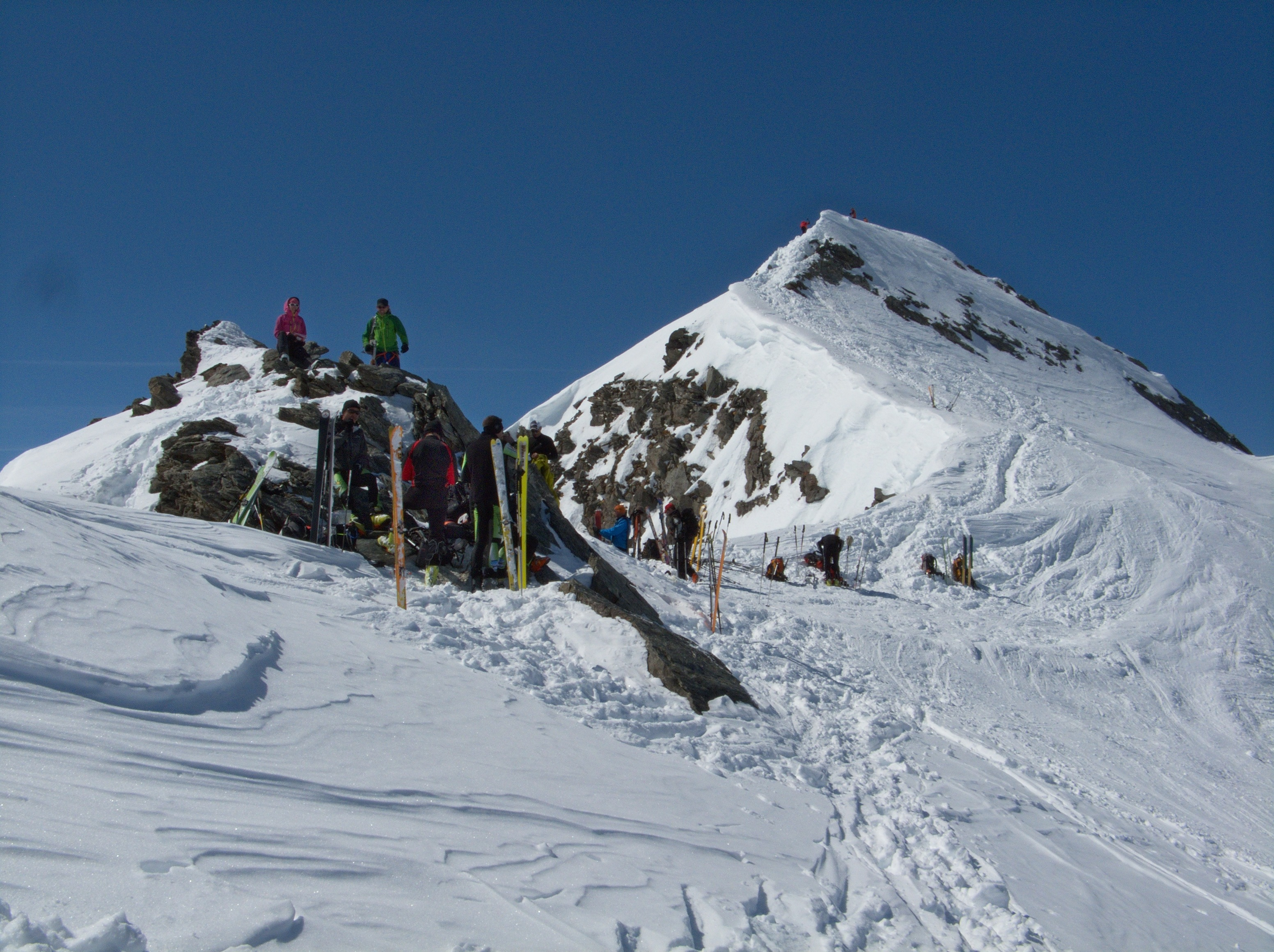
- The summit

Highest point
- Elevation: 3,336 m (10,945 ft)
- Prominence: 227 m (745 ft)
- Parent peak: La Ruinette
- Coordinates: 46°03′36″N 7°21′15″E

Geography
- Location within Switzerland
- Location: Valais, Switzerland
- Parent range: Pennine Alps

The Rosablanche is a mountain of the Swiss Pennine Alps, overlooking the Lac des Dix in the canton of Valais. It lies on the range between the valleys of Bagnes (west) and Hérémence (east), north of Le Pleureur.

== Climbing routes ==
The normal routes from the north side are from the Grande Dixence Dam (Dix lake) in Val d’Heremence, and from Siviez in Val de Nendaz, which can both be accessed by car or public bus routes. Both routes are technically simple but contain attractive glacier routes.

The route from the south starts in the Fionnay valley (Val de Bagnes) and it is snow-free in summer time.

While the mountain routes are considered somewhat monotonous during summer, in springtime Rosablanche attracts many ski tourers, which endure the ascent for the rewarding view onto the Prafleuri and Mourti glaciers on either side.

== The huts ==
There are several huts that climbers use as start points and for overnight stays. From the Fionnay side there is Cabane de Louvie in Val de Bagnes. From the north-east side there is Cabane de Prafleuri at 2624 m above the sea level, Cabane de Ecoulaies at 2575 m, and Ref. de la Barmaz at 2458 m. From the Siviez side there is Ref. de St. Laurent at 2485 m.
