= Chanrion Hut =

Mountain hut located in the canton of Valais in Switzerland

Coordinates: 45°56′21″N 7°22′51″E

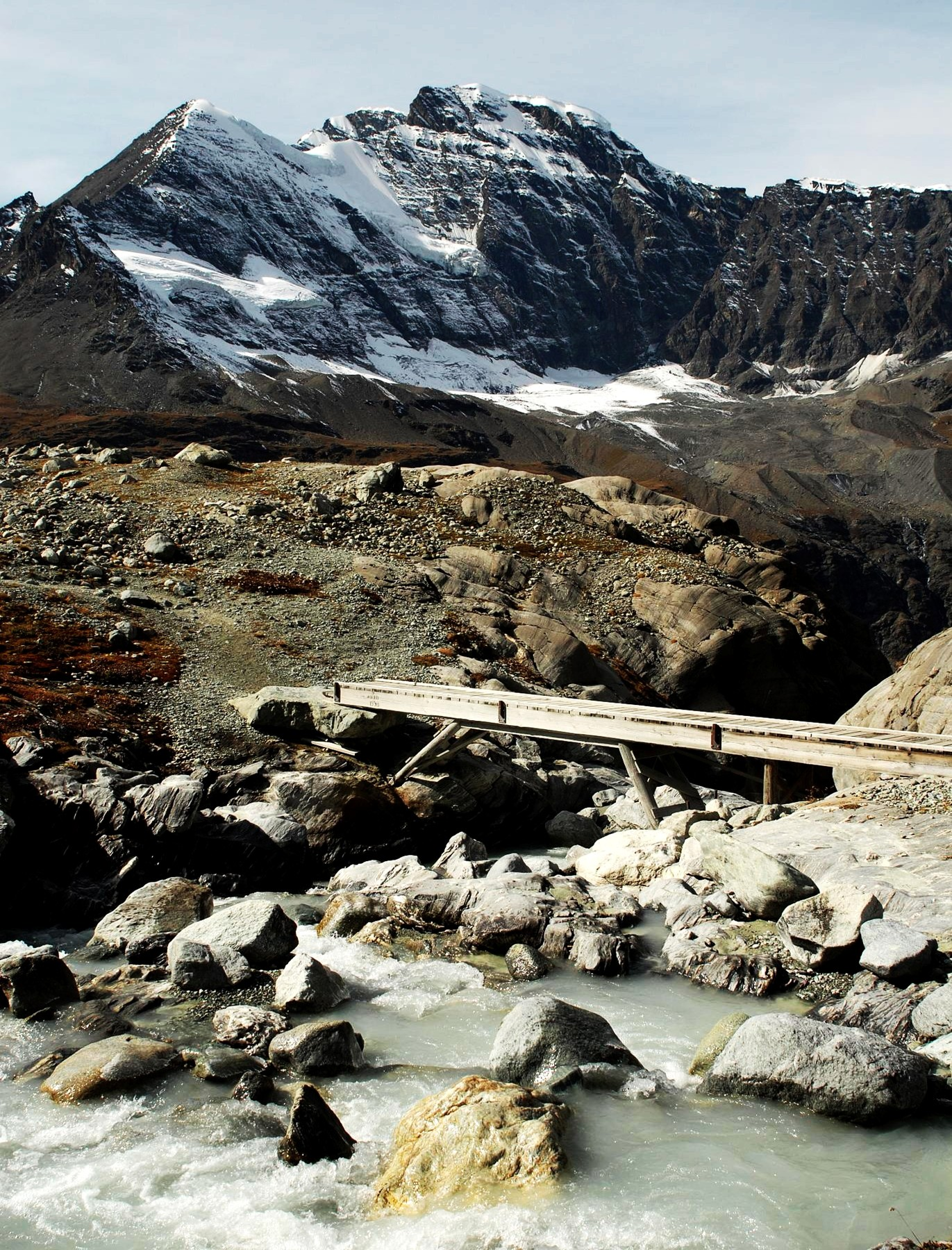
View of Grand Combin from the Chanrion area

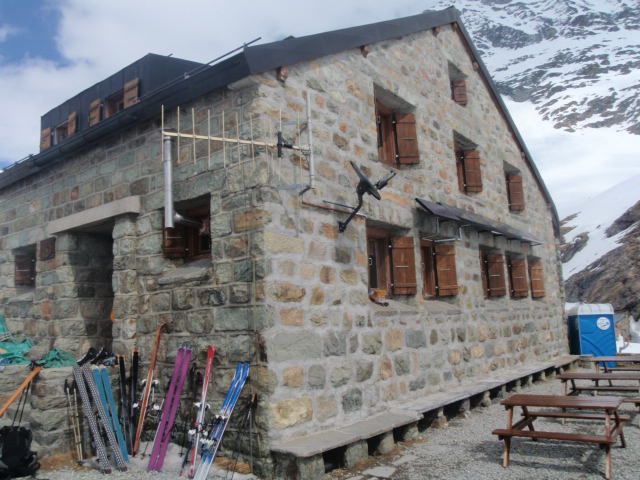
View of Chanrion Hut

The Chanrion Hut French: (Cabane de Chanrion ) is a mountain hut located in the upper Val de Bagnes in the canton of Valais in Switzerland. It lies in an isolated area south of Lac de Mauvoisin at an altitude of 2,462 metres, at the foot of Pointe d'Otemma. The easiest access is from the north (road to Mauvoisin).

The hut is owned by the Swiss Alpine Club.
