= Dent d'Hérens =

Mountain in the Pennine Alps

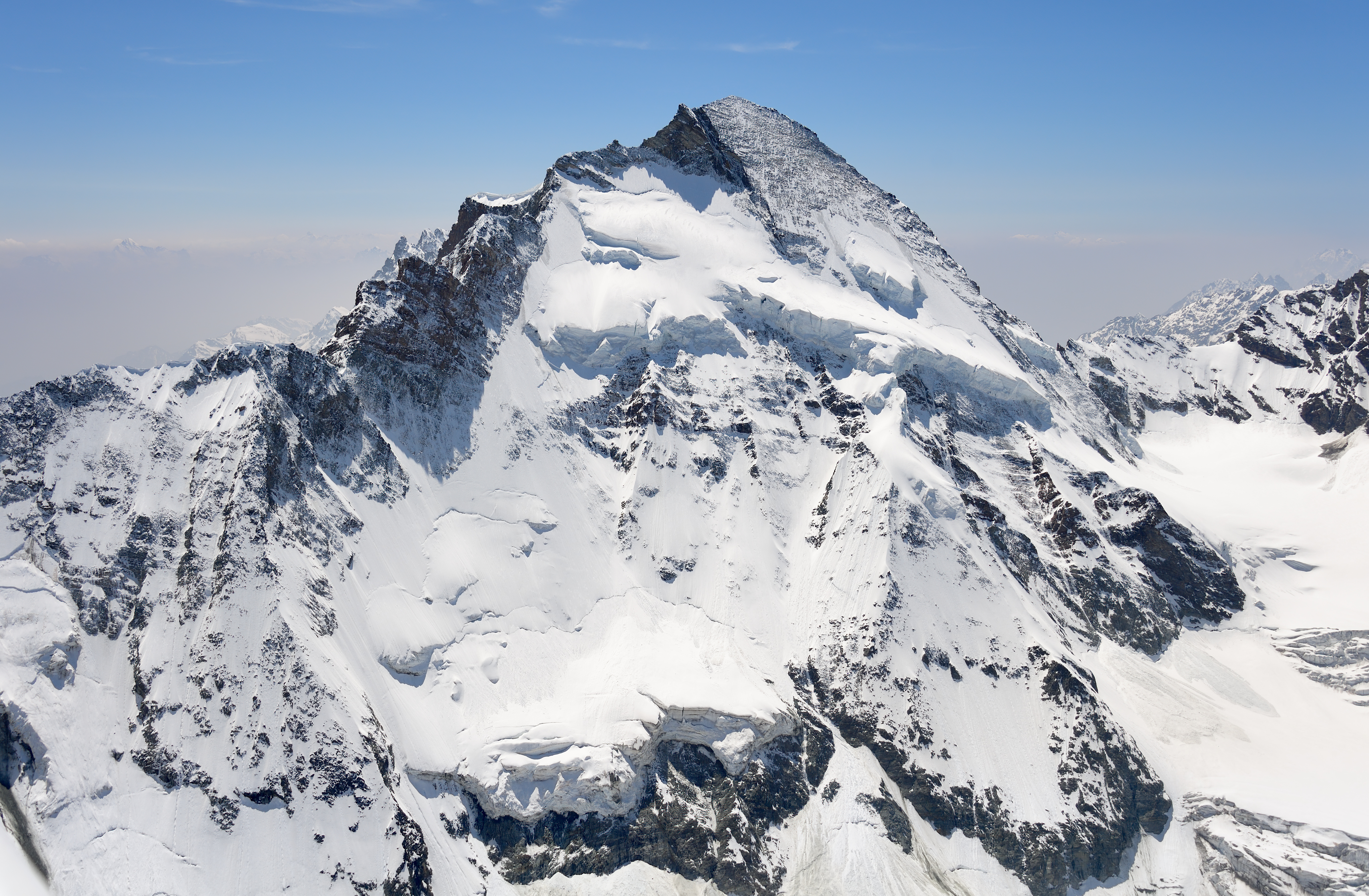
- North face of the Dent d'Hérens

Highest point
- Elevation: 4,173 m (13,691 ft)
- Prominence: 704 m (2,310 ft)
- Parent peak: Matterhorn
- Isolation: 3.7 km (2.3 mi)
- Coordinates: 45°58′12.2″N 7°36′18.3″E

Geography
- Location within Alps
- Location of the Matterhorn Location in the Alps
- Location: Aosta Valley, Italy/Valais, Switzerland
- Parent range: Pennine Alps

Climbing
- First ascent: 12 August 1863 by Florence Crauford Grove, William Edward Hall, Reginald Somerled Macdonald, Montagu Woodmass, Melchior Anderegg, Jean-Pierre Cachat and Peter Perren
- Easiest route: South-west flank and west ridge from Aosta hut (PD+)

The Dent d'Hérens (4,173 m) is a mountain in the Pennine Alps, lying on the border between Italy and Switzerland. The mountain lies a few kilometres west of the Matterhorn.

Notable summits along the east ridge are Punta Bianca (3917 m), the prominent Punta Carrel (3841 m) with its subpeak Punta Maquignaz, and the significant Punta Maria Cristina (3703 m).

The Aosta hut (2,781 m) is used for the normal route.

== Naming ==
The mountain takes its name from the Val d'Hérens, a valley located further to the north. The original name was probably the Dent Blanche, which is now that of the nearby Dent Blanche which overlooks the Val d'Hérens. On older maps, in the area where both summits lie, only the name Weisszahnhorn (from German: White Tooth Peak) was given, the French name (Dent Blanche) appearing only in 1820. Because cartographers usually made their observations far away from the remoter areas and also because the Dent d'Hérens is sometimes hidden behind the Dent Blanche, thus being less visible, the latter received the name. The inhabitants of the lower Val d'Hérens called the Dent d'Hérens, the Dent Blanche, but those of the upper Val d'Hérens called it the Dent de Rong or the Dent d'Erins, contributing to the general confusion. The names used today have been the official ones since the completion of the Dufour map in 1862.

== Geography ==
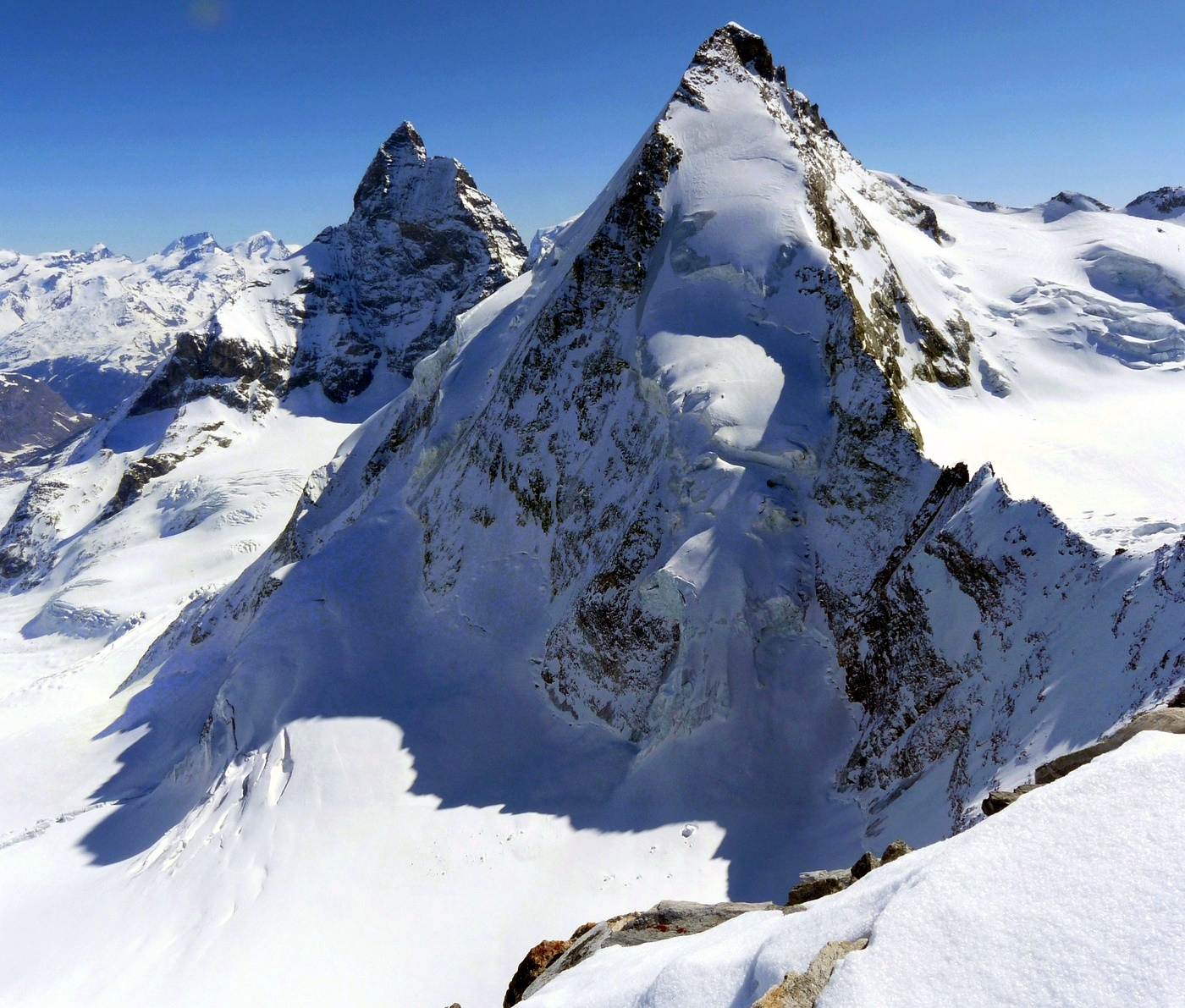
The Matterhorn (left) and the Dent d'Hérens (right) from the west side

The Dent d'Hérens is located on the main alpine watershed between the Swiss canton of Valais on the north and the Italian region of Aosta Valley on the south. The northern side of the mountain is part of the drainage basin of the Rhone, while the south side is part of the drainage basin of the Po River.

The Dent d'Hérens lies 4 km west of the Matterhorn and north of the village of Cervinia on the Italian (south) side. On the Swiss (north) side, the mountain rises above the Zmutt Glacier in the remote valley of Zmutt, 12 km away from the town of Zermatt. Despite its name suggests, the Dent d'Hérens does not overlook the Val d'Hérens, as the Dent Blanche lying a few kilometers to the north do.

== Climbing history ==
The first ascent of the mountain was by Florence Crauford Grove, William Edward Hall, Reginald Somerled Macdonald, Montagu Woodmass, Melchior Anderegg, Jean-Pierre Cachat and Peter Perren on 12 August 1863. The mountain had been attempted a few days before by Edward Whymper, Jean Antoine Carrel and Luc Meynet but Whymper insisted that they retreat from their planned route up the west ridge because of loose rock. Whymper was annoyed that he had not chosen the line taken up the Grandes Murailles glacier and the south-west flank by Melchior Anderegg on the first ascent and later wrote:

This was the only mountain in the Alps that I have essayed to ascend, that has not, sooner or later, fallen to me. Our failure was mortifying . . .

The first winter ascent was by M. Piacenza, J. J. Carrell and G. B. Pellisier on 16 January 1910.

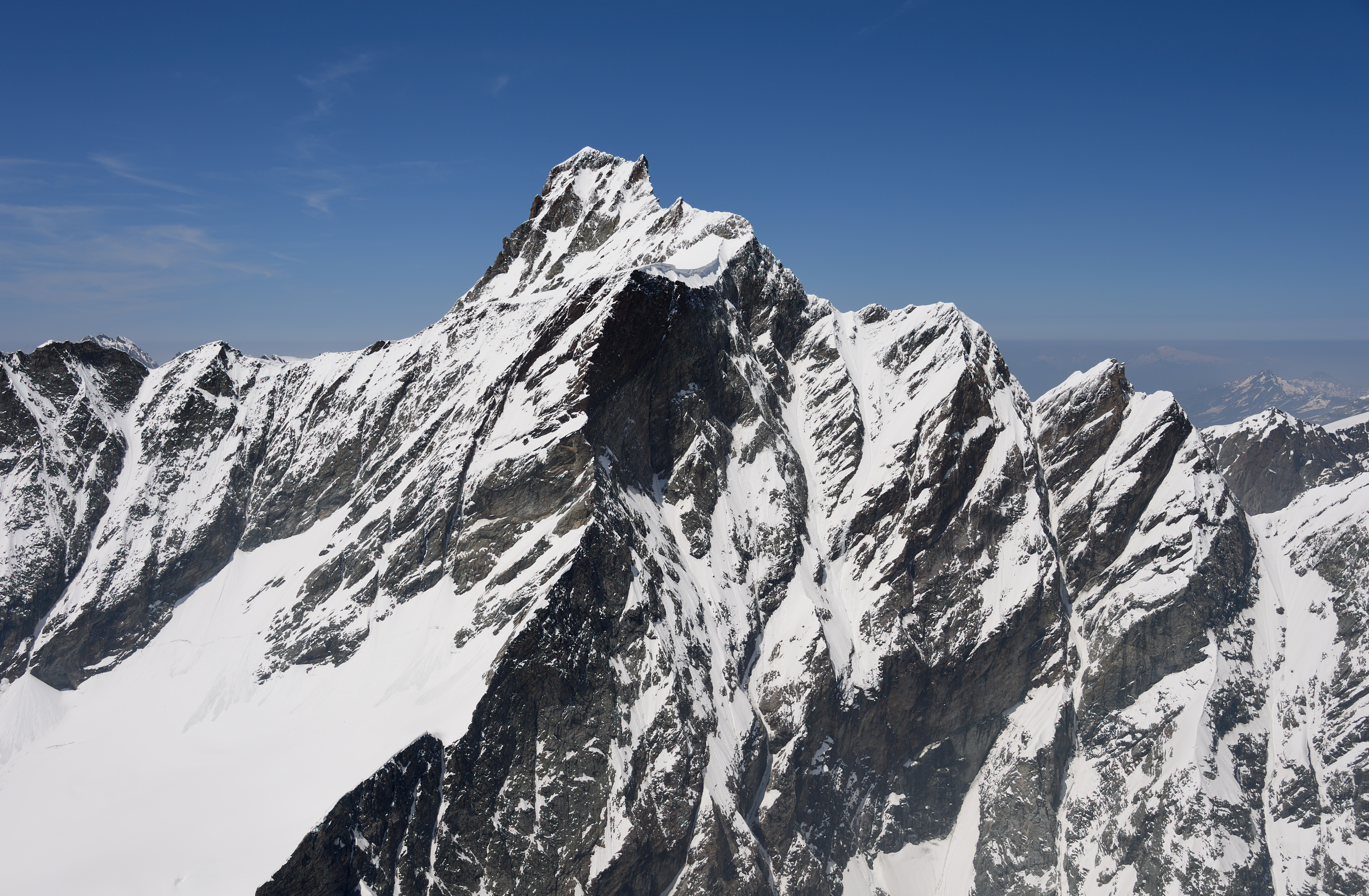
View of the Italian side of Dent d'Hérens with the east ridge running from the summit to the right image border

The 1,300-metre north face was first explored by George Finch, T. G. B. (Guy) Forster and Raymond Peto on August 2, 1923, via the North Face Diagonal or 'Finch Route'. A traversing rather than a more directly ascending line, it avoided the main difficulties of the face; these were tackled two years later by the direct line of the 'Welzenbach Route' (Willo Welzenbach and Eugen Allwein) on 10 August 1925, which may be considered the first ascent of the face. On 5 August 1959 Wilfrid Noyce, together with Colin J. Mortlock and Jack Sadler, made the first British ascent of the Welzenbach route. This route was the scene of a large rescue operation on its first winter ascent on 14–17 March 1964. Having climbed the face and bivouacked on the summit, the combined team of German (Gerhard Deweß and Leo Herncarek), Polish (Jerzy Hajdukiewicz and Krzysztof Berbeka) and Swiss (Eckhart Grassmann, Pierre Monkewitz and Dieter Naef) climbers suffered two falls, one of 200 metres, on the descent down the south-west face. The injured climbers were stuck on the mountain for four days before rescue, with Berbeka later dying in hospital and Deweß and Naef requiring amputations.

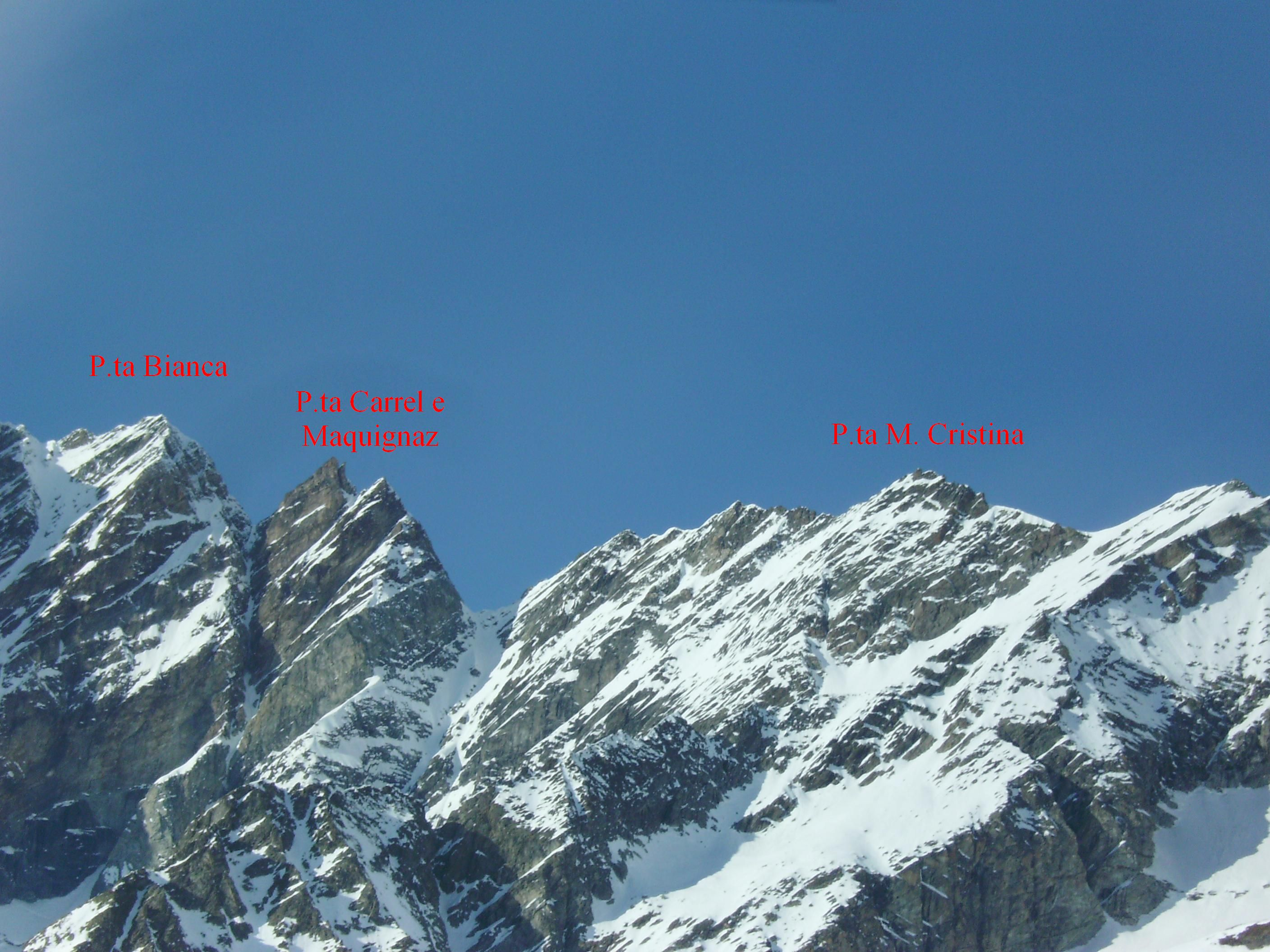
Part of the east ridge, which leads over to the Matterhorn

== See also ==
- List of 4000 metre peaks of the Alps
