= Mont Miné Glacier =

Glacier in Switzerland

- Glacier du Mont Miné
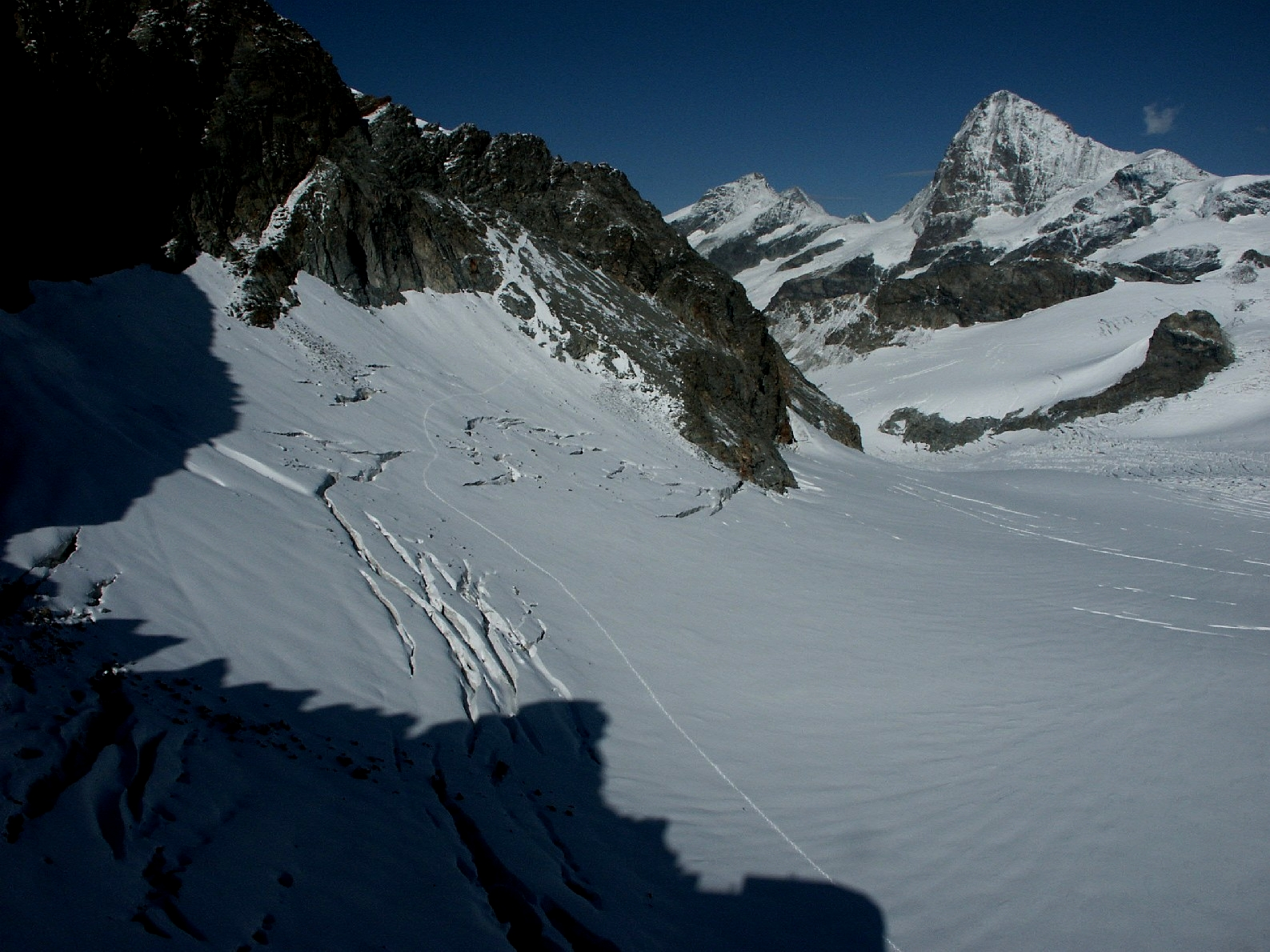
- View of the glacier and Dent Blanche from near the Bertol Hut
- Interactive map of Mont Miné Glacier
- Location: Valais, Switzerland
- Coordinates: 46°0′50″N 7°32′41″E
- Length: 7.9 km

The Mont Miné Glacier (French: Glacier du Mont Miné) is a 7.9 km (4.9 mi) long glacier (2005) in the Pennine Alps in the canton of Valais in Switzerland. In 1973 it had an area of 11 km^{2} (4.2 sq mi).

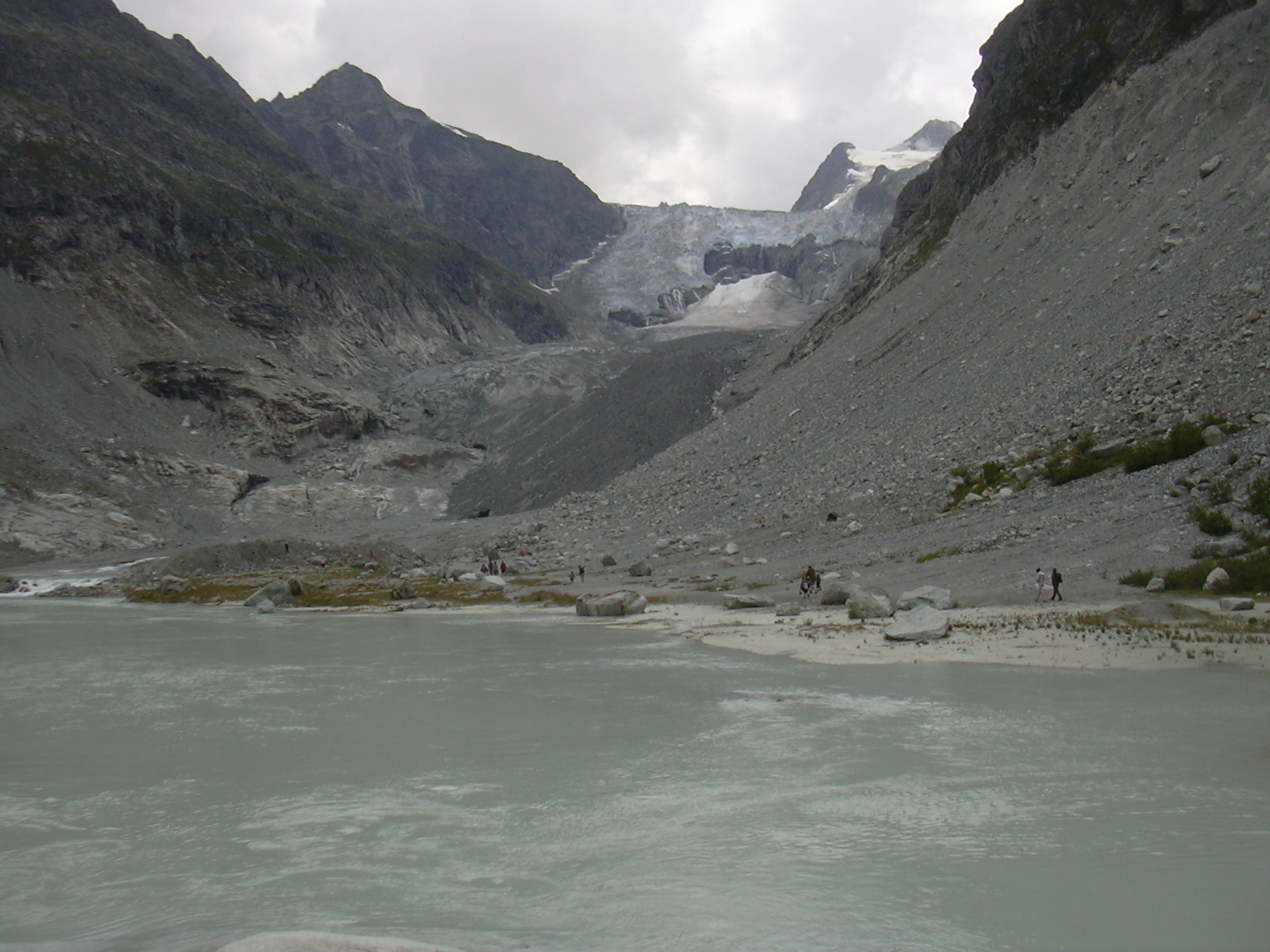
The glacier terminus near Ferpècle

== See also ==
- List of glaciers in Switzerland
- List of glaciers
- Retreat of glaciers since 1850
- Swiss Alps
