= Otemma Glacier =

Glacier in Switzerland

- Glacier d'Otemma
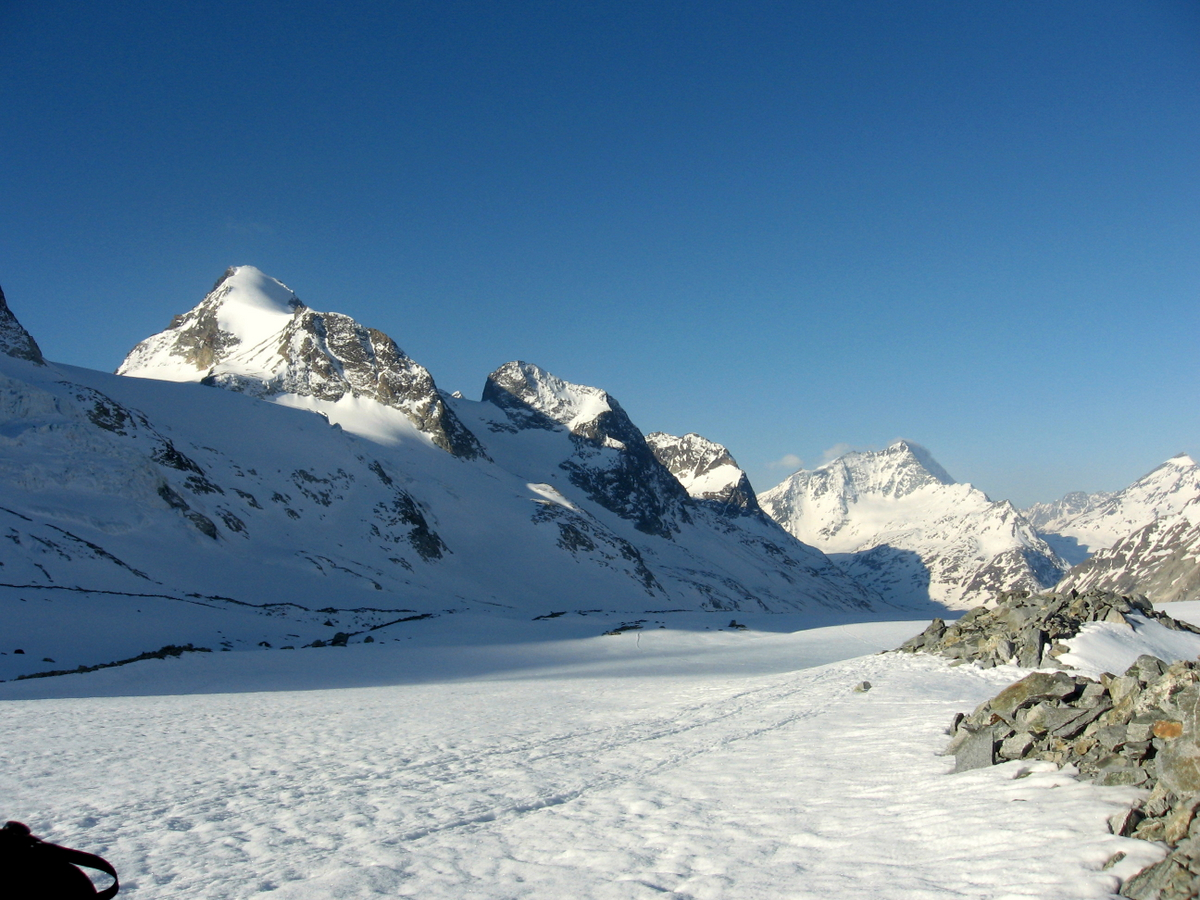
- Interactive map of Otemma Glacier
- Location: Valais, Switzerland
- Coordinates: 45°57′23″N 7°27′26″E
- Length: 7.7 km

The Otemma Glacier (French: Glacier d'Otemma) is a 7.7 km (4.8 mi) long glacier (2005) situated in the Pennine Alps in the canton of Valais in Switzerland. In 1973 it had a length of 8.7 km (5.4 mi), and an area of 17.5 km^{2} (6.8 sq mi) but, like most other alpine glaciers, is known to be receding. By 2010 it had receded a further 1.2 km (0.75 mi) from its 1973 position. In summer 2018, the snout zone (terminus) of the glacier collapsed.

== See also ==
- List of glaciers in Switzerland
- List of glaciers
- Retreat of glaciers since 1850
- Swiss Alps
