= Pigne d'Arolla =

Mountain in Switzerland

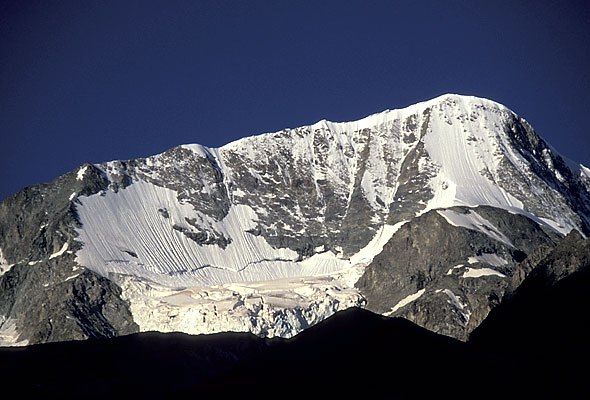
- Pigne d'Arolla

Highest point
- Elevation: 3,787 m (12,425 ft)
- Prominence: 154 m (505 ft)
- Parent peak: La Serpentine
- Coordinates: 45°59′28″N 7°27′18″E

Geography
- Location within Switzerland
- Location: Valais, Switzerland
- Parent range: Pennine Alps

Climbing
- First ascent: 9 July 1865 by A. W. Moore, Horace Walker and Jakob Anderegg

Pigne d'Arolla (3,787 m) is a mountain in the Pennine Alps in Switzerland. The first ascent was made by A. W. Moore and Horace Walker with the guide Jakob Anderegg on 9 July 1865. It is commonly climbed as part of the Haute Route.

== Route ==
The standard route starts from the Cabane des Vignettes at 3,158 metres (10,361 ft) and contains some scrambling and snow travel. It is considered non-technical and easy for fit and experienced trekkers with snow skills.

== 2018 ski-hiking accident ==
Seven skiers in a party of 14 who made an unplanned overnight stay at 3,000 metres on the mountain in a snowstorm in April 2018, died of hypothermia or fall.

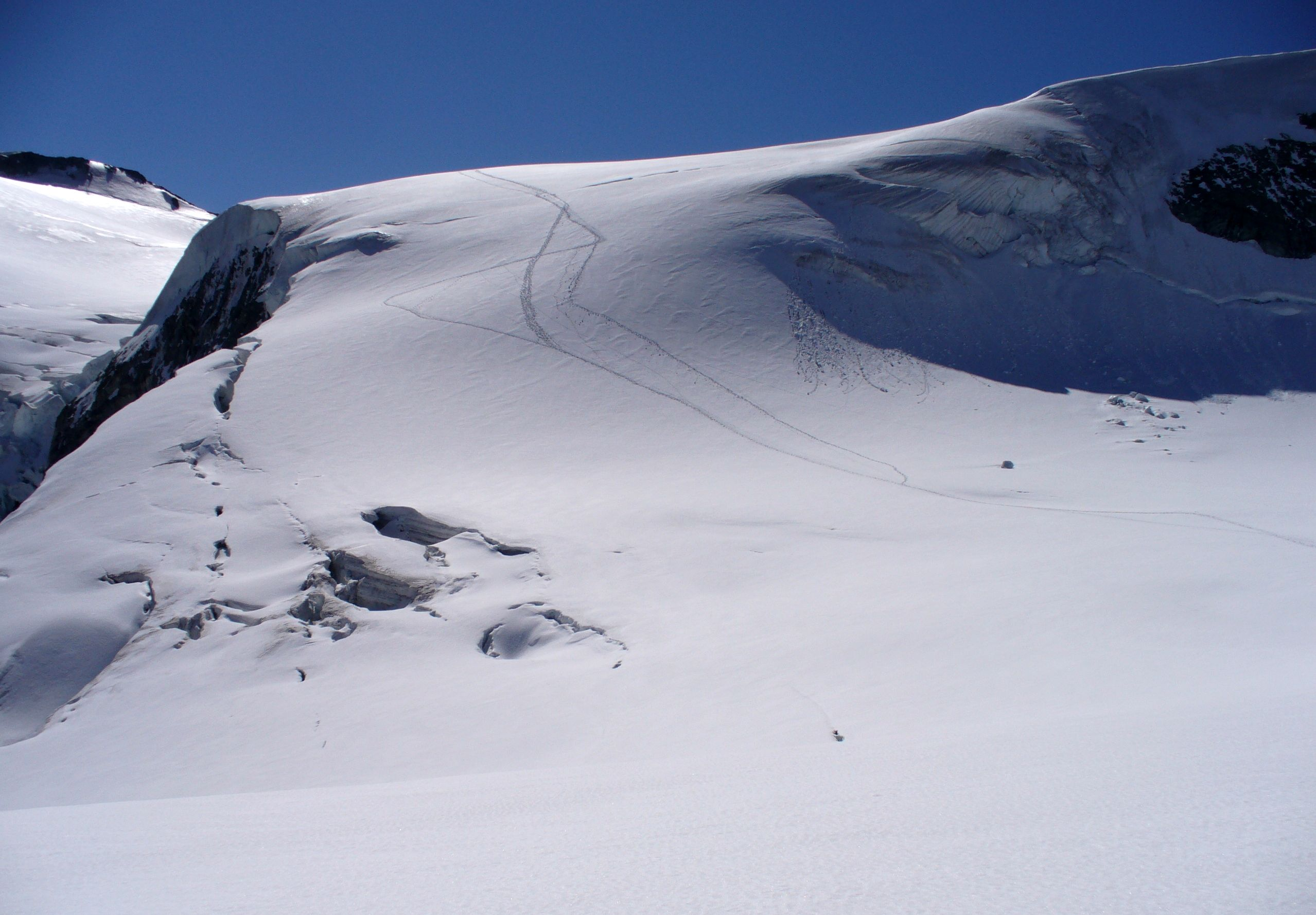
Serpentine classic route to the Vignettes hut (August 2007)
