= Arolla =

Village in the canton of Valais in Switzerland

Coordinates: 46°01′N 7°29′E

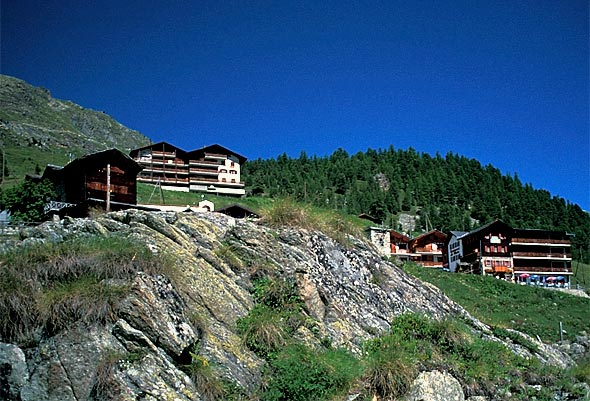
Looking uphill near the village centre

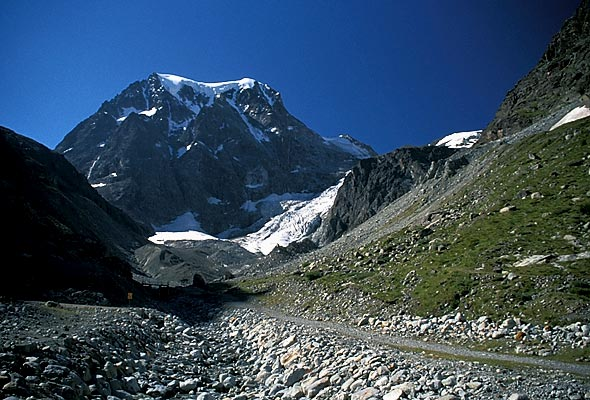
The north face of Mont Collon above Arolla

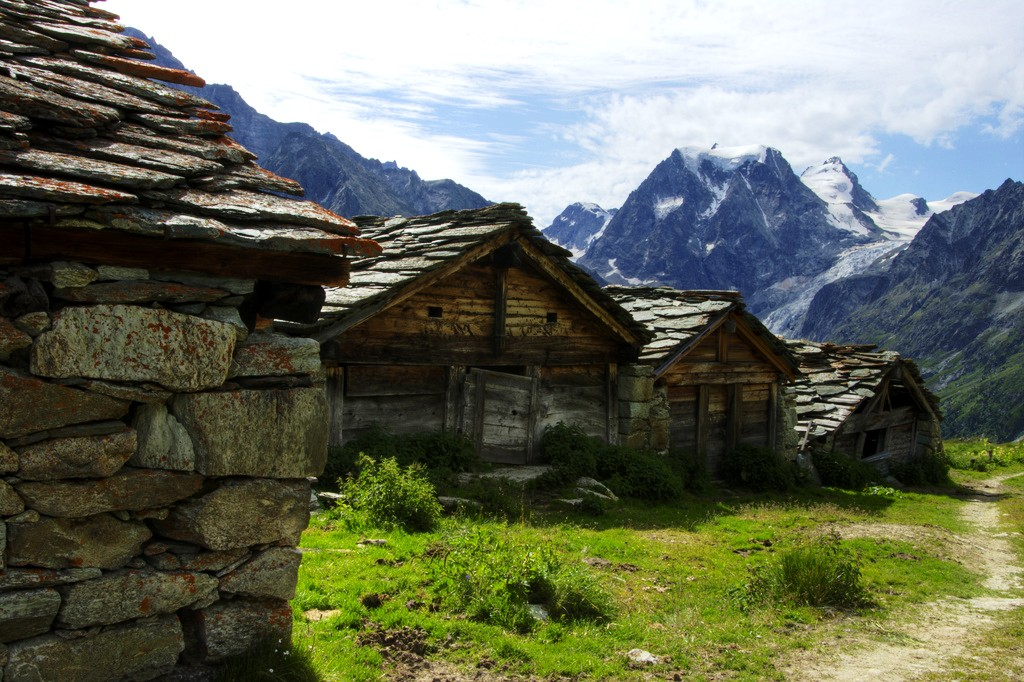
Above Arolla

Arolla is a village in the municipality of Evolène in the Swiss canton of Valais. It is situated at the end of the Val d'Hérens, south of the cantonal capital, Sion.

== Geography ==
Arolla is situated at 1998 m above sea level, at the foot of Mont Collon in the Pennine Alps. The village is also overlooked by the 3796-metre Pigne d'Arolla, which can be climbed from the Cabane des Vignettes or Dix Hut. The Arolla Glacier is located south of Arolla, between Mont Collon and the Pigne d'Arolla.

Pra Gra is an abandoned hamlet above Arolla at 2479 m, which can be reached on foot in approximately 90 minutes. The views of Mont Collon and the glacial trench at the end of the valley are particularly notable from this location.

=== Tourism ===
Arolla's location makes it a popular starting point for mountain expeditions. Routes such as the Patrouillle des Glaciers and the Haute Route, a classic high-altitude mountain trek between Chamonix and Zermatt, pass through the village as well. There are over 100 kilometres of mountain biking paths in the area.

Arolla's ski area lies above the village on the western side of the valley, with five lifts and 47 kilometres of pistes. Its high altitude guarantees snow well into the spring.

Hotels in Arolla include Hotel Kurhaus, situated at the top of the series of hairpin bends that rise through the village. The historic Hôtel Mont Collon, located near the entrance to the village, is closed since December 2014. There is a post office, mountain sports equipment shop, hotel, and bus stop in the small village centre.

=== Flora and fauna ===
The Arolla pine or Swiss pine, a high-altitude species in the white pine group, is named after the village and grows in the Alps and the Carpathians.
