= Correction of the Rhône upstream of Lake Geneva =

Correction of a river in Switzerland

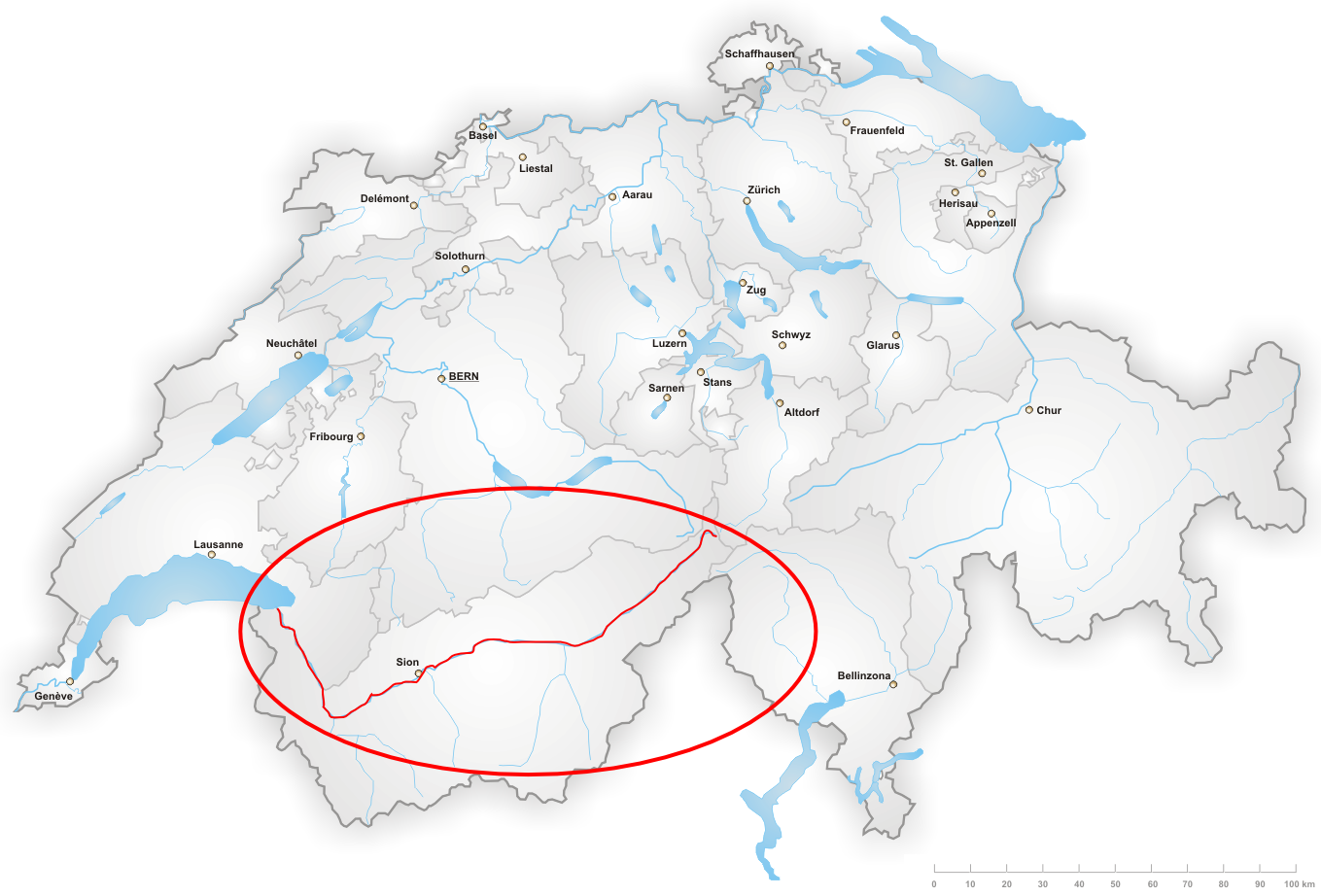
Course of the Rhone upstream from Lake Geneva.

The correction of the Rhône upstream of Lake Geneva concerns the Rhône River located in the Swiss Alps. In its Swiss section, the Rhône has undergone several modifications designed to control its course and reduce the harmful effects of flooding. In 1860, a flood caused extensive damage throughout the Rhône valley. This event triggered the decision to build the first Rhône correction between 1863 and 1894. A second correction was carried out between 1930 and 1960. In September 2000, the Valais Grand Council decided to undertake the third correction of the Rhône from Gletsch to Lake Geneva, in collaboration with the Canton of Vaud. In 2008, the Swiss Confederation announced that it was raising funds for the third correction, which is expected to take between 25 and 30 years to complete.

== Geographical location ==
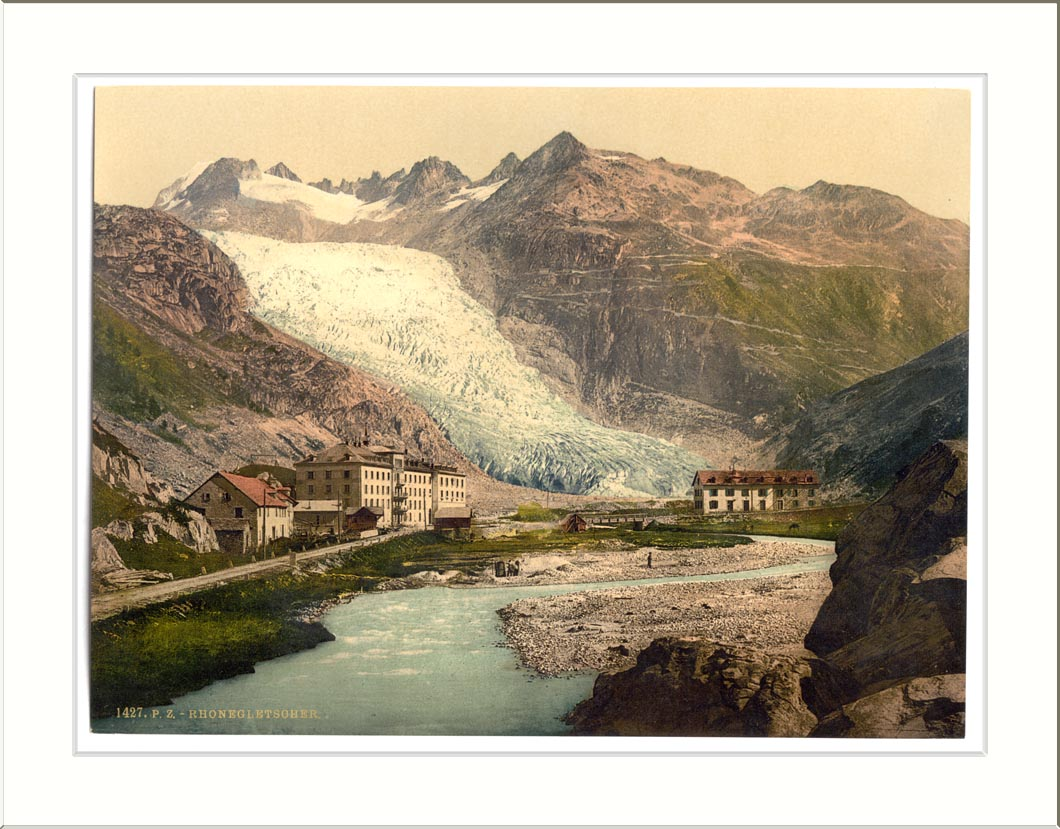
Rhone Glacier at Gletsch in 1900.

Rhone watershed upstream from Lake Geneva.

The Rhône rises in the St. Gotthard massif in the Swiss Alps. It is formed by the melting of the Rhône glacier, and flows through the long valley of the same name through the canton of Valais, marking the border with the canton of Vaud in the Chablais region before joining Lake Geneva in the commune of Port-Valais. The Rhône, between Saint-Maurice and the lake, marks the border between the cantons of Valais and Vaud. Upstream of Lake Geneva, the Rhône runs for some 170 kilometers, receiving water from around two hundred torrents (from Vaud and Valais).

The Rhône's main tributaries upstream of Lake Geneva are the Massa, fed by the Aletsch glacier, the Lonza in the Lötschental valley, and the Grande Eau, which rises in the Diablerets massif. On the left bank of the Rhône, from its source to Lake Geneva, its main tributaries are the Vispa, the Navizence in the Val d'Anniviers, the Borgne in the Val d'Hérens, the Drance joining the Rhône at Martigny, and the Vièze passing through Monthey. Due to its numerous torrents and tributaries originating from the Alpine peaks, the Rhône's hydrological regime is strongly influenced by melting glaciers and snow, resulting in significant seasonal variations in flow and water level (high flow in summer, low flow in winter).

== The Rhône before the corrections ==
Today, the people of the Valais hear most about the Third River correction project. However, two other large-scale corrections preceded it, and recent research has shown that dikes protected parts of the land as early as the Middle Ages.

=== Measures before the first correction ===
Documents preserved in the communal archives held by the Valais State Archives provide an insight into the life of residents before the first Rhône correction. Far from the stereotype of a marshy, unusable valley floor, far from the cliché of a frightening river to be avoided, their existence was punctuated by agro-pastoral practices that perfectly integrated the varied resources of the Rhône plain. Shepherds led their flocks to pastures near the river or between its branches. This practice continued until the early 20th century.

==== Neolithic and Antiquity ====
Land along the banks of the Rhône has probably been farmed since Neolithic times. In fact, according to Théodore Kuonen, "the practice of grazing livestock dates back to the time of the first settlers, which is attributed to the Neolithic period."

As far as the construction of river defense systems is concerned, we have no sources or archaeological finds to prove the construction of this type of development. Nevertheless, the construction of large Roman villas on the plain suggests the existence of barriers (from the Latin words barra or barreria) as early as Antiquity.

==== Middle Ages and Ancien Régime ====
In the 14th century, the Count of Savoy maintained the section of the Great St. Bernard route around the Saint-Maurice d'Agaune toll station, some 20 km from Bex to Martigny. This included the maintenance of bridges over the Rhône, its right-bank tributaries downstream of Saint-Maurice and its left-bank tributaries upstream, and the construction of dykes to protect the main crossings. The work is well known, particularly through the series of accounts of the toll collector Jacques Wichard and his son Guillaume, preserved at the Archivio di Stato di Torino and digitized by the Archives du Valais.

In the 15th century, the landscape of the plain between Martigny and Saillon, dotted with tree-covered islands, meadows, and, here and there, fields, is fairly well documented. They reveal that the farmers had a precise knowledge of the land's potential. Primarily intended for cattle grazing, they also provide wood, hay, and stones, and can even be sown with cereals. The land thus represents a major economic stake, prompting riverside communities to fight over it and restrict the river's freedom to extend meadows and crops. They built dykes, or barriers, using stakes, intertwined branches, and piles of stones and gravel. The first step was to define the limits of the Rhône so that certain areas of the plain could be used. The second phase involves maintaining the structures created for this purpose. The scale of the work did not frighten the inhabitants, who were more concerned about the damage caused to their possessions. As the land along the Rhône is mainly communal property, the construction and maintenance of the dikes is the responsibility of the communities. This work was carried out in the form of drudgery by the men of the villages, in proportion to their use of the communal land.

Significant climatic changes occurred during the Little Ice Age, a cold period that hit Europe from around 1350 to 1860. The most spectacular result was the rapid advance of the Alpine glaciers. In the Valais, episodes of violent rainfall caused numerous floods and a significant increase in the amount of material that the Rhône struggled to transport. As the bottom of the riverbed rises, the river weaves new arms, in the middle of which islands multiply, and takes up more and more space on the plain. During periods of high water, the river rises out of its bed, deposits alluvial deposits on the valley floor, destroys crops, and feeds the wetlands in the lowlands. This mobility, which implies a displacement of the riverbed, is incompatible with the extension of pastures, crops, and communication routes. As early as the 15th century, the river's inhabitants realized that the Rhône had to be straightened to increase the force of the current, to protect bridges, roads, and access paths to farmland, and to guarantee the boundaries of communes and properties.

Numerous conflicts arose between communes as a result of changes to the riverbed or works undertaken to constrain it. This was also the case between the Bernese, who dominated the Pays de Vaud, and the Valaisans. In 1756, Bern and Valais decided "to draw up an exact plan of the Rhône in its present state, with all the barriers and the old and new limits", to put an end to the incessant conflicts caused by the delimitation of the riverbed. The river forms the border between the Valais and Bernese Chablais.

==== Three examples of flooding ====
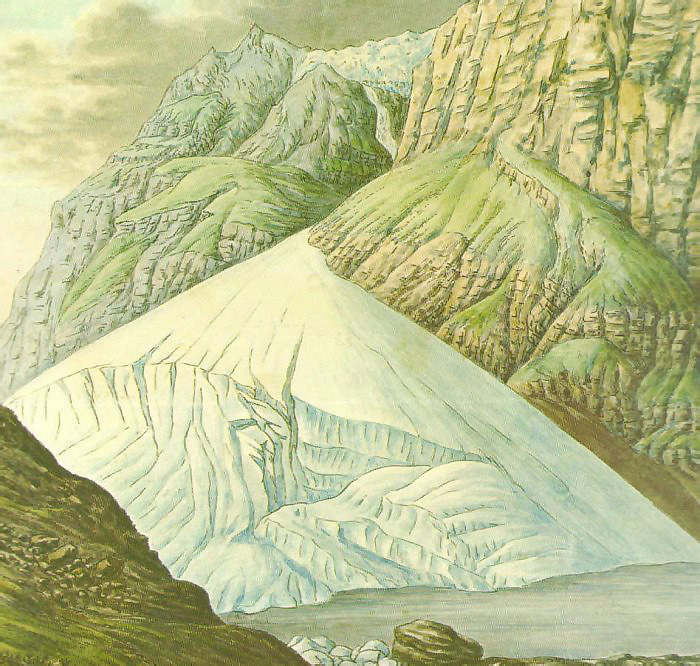
Dam formed by the Giétro glacier in 1818.

The first recorded flood occurred in 563, during the Tauredunum disaster. A landslide created a dam in the Rhône valley, and a body of water formed upstream of this natural dam, which eventually gave way. The breaking wave caused damage both downstream and on the shores of Lake Geneva. According to Vischer, the site of the landslide was located in the Saint-Maurice region. The latest studies locate the landslide further down the Rhône, not far from where the Rhône now flows into Lake Geneva.

Devastating floods in 1545, caused by heavy rains, were reported at the Diet of February 26, 1546: "This session, decided on at the last Christmas Council, is being held today in connection with the terrible flooding of the Rhône, as a result of which the route du Pays downstream from the Morge, the property owned and leased, the routes, the common pastures, and other places still, could be entirely lost, wiped out by the waters, if appropriate and indispensable measures are not taken, and if the Rhône is not led in a straight line." This passage proves that the authorities feared a recurrence of such events. It was important to them to safeguard the royal road and the land used by their subjects.

Other floods are caused by glaciers. Glacial flooding occurs when the movement of a glacier obstructs the course of a river, causing the river to impound water behind the glacier, and the glacier to break up under the weight of the water, causing major damage. In 1818, the Giétro glacier obstructed the course of the Drance (a tributary of the Rhône), creating a lake containing 18 million m^{3} of water. The glacier gave way on June 16, 1818, causing 44 deaths and destroying numerous buildings in the valley.

==== Modern state ====
During the period of French domination, the canton of Vaud was formed in 1803, taking over the Bernese territory below Saint-Maurice. The canton of Valais joined the Swiss Confederation in 1815. These political changes led to a determination to develop the Valais, in particular by strengthening agriculture. Roads and bridges were built throughout the canton. In 1850, a railroad line was built between Lake Geneva and Sion. Protection of the Rhône Valley from the river's floods was increasingly under consideration.

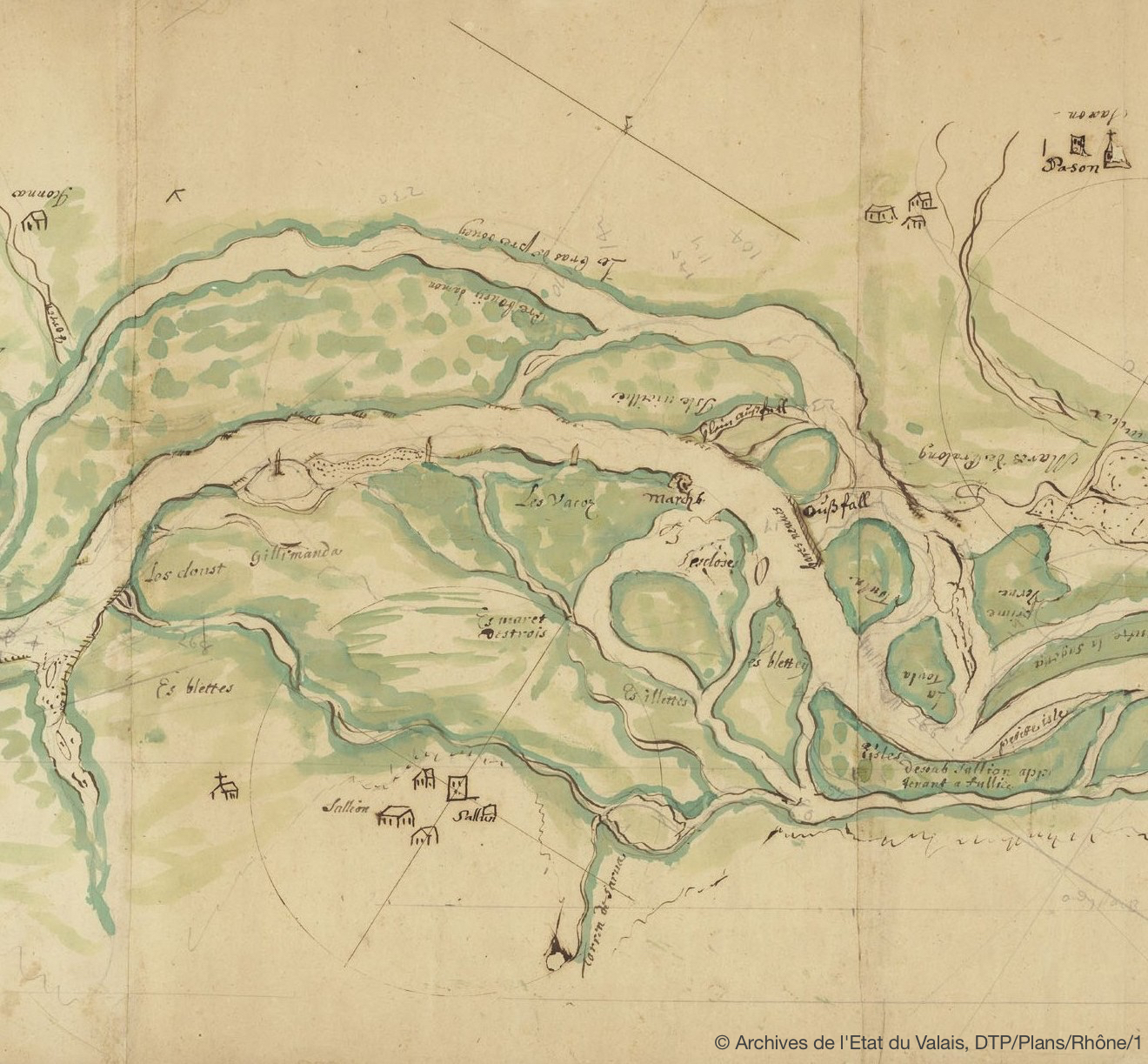
Detail of a map of the Rhône drawn up in 1803. The arms of the river between Saillon and Saxon.

As early as 1803, the Valais State Council convened the communes of Riddes, Saxon, Martigny, Fully, Saillon, and Leytron to decide on a joint plan to give the river a specific course. Tired of the ruinous and interminable formalities of the courts, certain communes had asked the cantonal government to find a solution to the crisis that had been going on since the catastrophe of 1782 (when a terrible flood had caused the river to change course in the area between Saillon and Saxon, causing damage as far away as Vernayaz). Thanks to this new willingness to compromise, a project was drawn up against the "common enemy": the Rhone, demonstrating the company's long experience with the river. Although the actual implementation of the program would take several years, it was a major step forward.

From 1830 onwards, work began on rectifying the course of the Rhône, notably in the Rarogne plain and between Riddes and Martigny. Here, engineer Ignace Venetz developed the system of groins protruding into the Rhone bed, which was adopted for the first Rhone correction. In addition to this work, the riverbed was also lowered and the material clogging it cleared, a process already tried and tested by residents as early as the end of the 16th century. The cantonal law of 1833 allowed the Conseil d'État to order riverside communes to carry out work on the banks of the Rhône, without however providing subsidies for the work, even though these major financial burdens exceeded communal resources. Some communes were obliged to sell bourgeois land when they were unable to pay for the work. The situation was particularly serious in the mid-19th century. An upsurge in flooding from 1834 onwards was compounded by the political unrest and revolutions that paralyzed the state between 1839 and 1852.

In 1860, Karl Culmann was commissioned by the Swiss Federal Council to draw up a "report to the Swiss Federal Council on the study of Swiss torrents". In his opinion, the structures were not properly combined, and only two stretches of the Rhône were well corrected: a 3.5 km section at Rarogne and a stretch at Martigny.

== First correction ==
During the 19th century, many floods were the result of heavy precipitation during a mild spell, when river flows were already high due to melting snow. 1855 and 1857 were particularly noteworthy. However, it was the flood of 1860 that "probably surpassed all events of modern times in its magnitude between the Goms Valley and Martigny."

The floods were particularly severe, destroying not only crops but also several villages. The inhabitants of the Rhone Valley tried to protect themselves against the floods. However, their resources were limited, and the work was confined to the perimeters of the communes, with little coordination.

=== Political context ===
In Valais, the main obstacle to the implementation of projects is political: decision-making power rests with the communes, and the work cannot be integrated into an overall plan, as each commune refuses to assume the financial burden of diking that does not directly benefit it. What's more, since the Rhône did not become part of the public domain of the State of Valais until 1933, all costs had to be borne by the owners of the river, whether private individuals, communes, or bourgeoisies. However, the cantonal law of 1833 allowed the Conseil d'Etat to order the riverside communes to carry out work on the banks of the Rhône, without providing subsidies for the work, even though these major financial burdens often exceeded communal resources.

In 1860, the Geneva Committee for Subscriptions to Help Flood Victims in Switzerland, headed by General Guillaume-Henri Dufour, commissioned a report on the floods, the resulting damage, and their causes. The committee calls on the Federal Council to launch a comprehensive correction of the Rhone and donate a substantial sum to the affected communes.

The extensive damage caused by the flood of 1860 prompted the Valais State Council to ask the Swiss Confederation for help in damming the Rhone. The Confederation had already provided financial support for the Rhine correction project in the cantons of Graubünden and St. Gallen. The people of Valais had long been convinced of the need to dam the river along its entire course. However, having had to pay off substantial war debts following the occupation of Valais after the defeat of the Sonderbund, the canton lacked the resources to undertake the damming of the river. Protecting the railway line was also an important economic issue for Valais and Switzerland. The train already arrived in Sion and will link up with Italy via the Simplon line. The federal authorities, aware of the political and economic stakes involved, intend to respond positively to Valais' request. In a way, this is an important political act aimed at reintegrating the Valais after the Sonderbund War.

As the Confederation had no department responsible for river development, it asked two experts to give an opinion on the correction project. Friedrich Wilhelm Hartmann and Leopold Blotnitzki delivered their conclusions between April 1862 and December 1863. At the end of 1863, the Federal Assembly decided that the Confederation should pay one-third of the costs. Senior management of the work was the responsibility of the Federal Council, which relied on the advice of Hartmann and Blotnitzki on technical matters. Project management was entrusted to the canton of Valais. The Valais engineers based their work on that of Ignace Venetz, who died in 1859. Their projects were validated by federal experts. The correction was carried out in several stages between 1863 and 1894.

=== Work from 1863 to 1894 ===
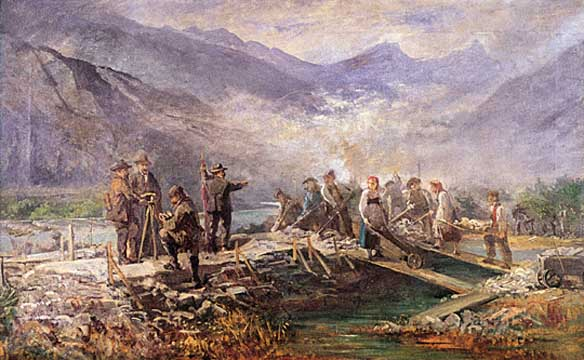
Correction works of the Rhône in Raron, oil painting by Raphaël Ritz.

Correction work began in 1863 on the initiative of the canton of Valais, then by federal decision. The work focused on the section downstream of the confluence with the Massa. The project concerns a 120-kilometer stretch of river cut by two natural obstacles: the Illgraben alluvial fan (between La Souste and Sierre) and the Saint-Barthélemy alluvial fan (upstream of Lavey). These two alluvial fans are not part of the correction works.

The work consists of systematically building two parallel embankment dykes to create a new river bed and, in some cases, a new course for the river, the limits of which are fixed. Opposite groins, perpendicular to the river's axis, concentrate the flow towards the center of the bed and protect the banks.

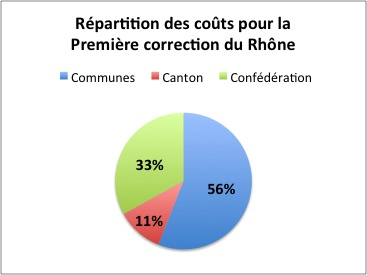
Cost distribution for the first correction of the Rhône.

Upstream of Leuk, the work was combined with the construction of the railroad line, which was built on top of the dike. Between the confluence with the Massa and Sion, a new bed was dug for the Rhône. The bed is narrowed and the route is taut, with long straights and sweeping bends. The banks are protected by dikes. In the section between Sion and Lavey, the same type of correction is used. Between Saint-Maurice and Lake Geneva, the same type of correction was also adopted, but in consultation with the canton of Vaud, as the Rhône marks the border between the two cantons for some 30 kilometers.

Work on the first Rhône correction cost over ten million francs, a third of which was borne by the Swiss Confederation. This means that most of the costs will be borne by the riverside communities themselves, as the canton will only pay for the dikes directly protecting the main road and the bridges it crosses. As citizens are often unable to pay the full cost of taxes, men, women, and children work on the Rhône correction during "corvées" (see illustration by Raphaël Ritz). The communes also bore the entire cost of maintaining the dikes, until 1903, when the State took over half of the expenses. Like the construction of the railroad, the first Rhône correction is one of the great works of the 19th century.

=== Consequences ===
The correction of the Rhône River planned in 1863, resulted in the partial securing of lowland land and communication routes. In a way, it helped to drain several marshes and clear large areas, thus providing the population with arable land.

Although the first correction rectified the course of the Rhône in the plain, the work undertaken did not resolve the problem of wetlands, which subsequently increased in importance. Residual water cannot flow into the river, and drainage channels have to be multiplied to eliminate it. Despite all the efforts made, flooding continued both during and after construction, notably in 1877, 1883, 1896, 1897, and 1914. The riverbed was heightened by the movement of tributaries and the inability of the infrastructure in place to ensure sufficient current velocity to carry away gravel and other sediments.

== Second correction ==
=== Context ===
Raising the riverbed is becoming a problem. When the river overflows, large areas are affected, as the dikes prevent the spilled water from flowing back into the river. On the other hand, the intensification of land use in the plain increases the potential for damage. Anxiety is particularly high in the central Valais, where rising water levels are proving to be the most significant, even though the region has the highest population density and the most prosperous and extensive cultivated areas. The action had to be taken as quickly as possible to protect the plain, its inhabitants, and its activities. As a result, a second correction took place between 1930 and 1960, the main aim of which was to improve certain structures built during the first correction.

=== Work ===
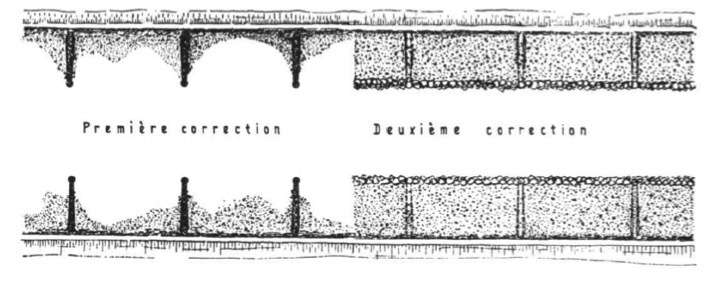
Containment system for the two corrections of the Rhône.

The designers of the first correction system imagined that the gap between the groynes would quickly fill up with sand and silt carried by the Rhône, but this did not happen. The gravel thus remained in the minor bed, causing it to rise.

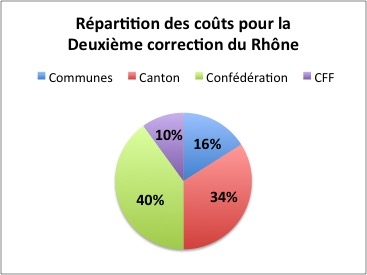
Cost distribution for the second Rhône correction.

The second Rhône correction, in 1936, consisted of reinforcing the dikes and raising them, as well as narrowing the bed to increase its carrying capacity by linking the heads of the groins with riprap. In this way, the minor bed is contained between parallel submersible dykes. The gaps between the groins are filled with material dredged from the river to form a glacis protecting the moat. The work was carried out in three stages between 1936 and 1961, in successive sections.

Total expenditure on the second correction amounted to CHF 14,359,198, of which the federal government subsidized 40%, the canton of Valais 30%, and the Swiss Federal Railways 10%, in recognition of the benefits the Rhone correction brought to their facilities. The State of Valais, as owner of the cantonal road, is contributing a further 4%. The remaining 16% will be borne by the local communities affected by the work.

=== Gravel mining ===
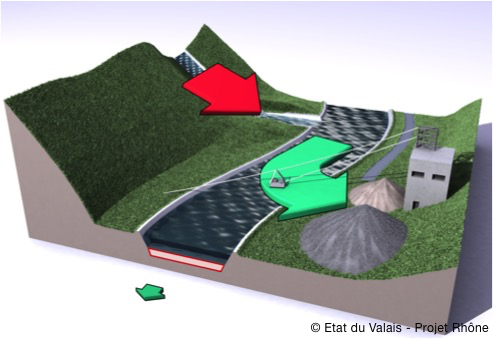
The Rhône and the gravel pits.

In the 1960s, the development of gravel pits along the river made a major contribution to eliminating the problem of gravel drifting. The tributaries bring around 260,000 cubic meters of material into the Rhône every year (red arrow in illustration). Gravel pits remove 290,000 m^{3} of material from the river every year (large green arrow in illustration). The Rhône, on the other hand, has too shallow a gradient, so it only discharges 30,000 m^{3} of material per year (thin green arrow in illustration). Finally, as the gravel pits have removed a great deal of material in recent decades, the bottom of the Rhône has fallen (red part in the illustration) and is now much lower than it was at the end of the second correction.

Gravel pits are essential regulators of the Rhône bed level. They must remove just the right amount of gravel: not too much, so as not to plow the bottom and weaken the dikes, nor too little, to prevent the Rhône from filling up. When the river is widened on certain stretches to secure the plain (Third Rhône Correction), this system will be maintained and further improved.

== Third correction ==
=== Dangerous situation ===
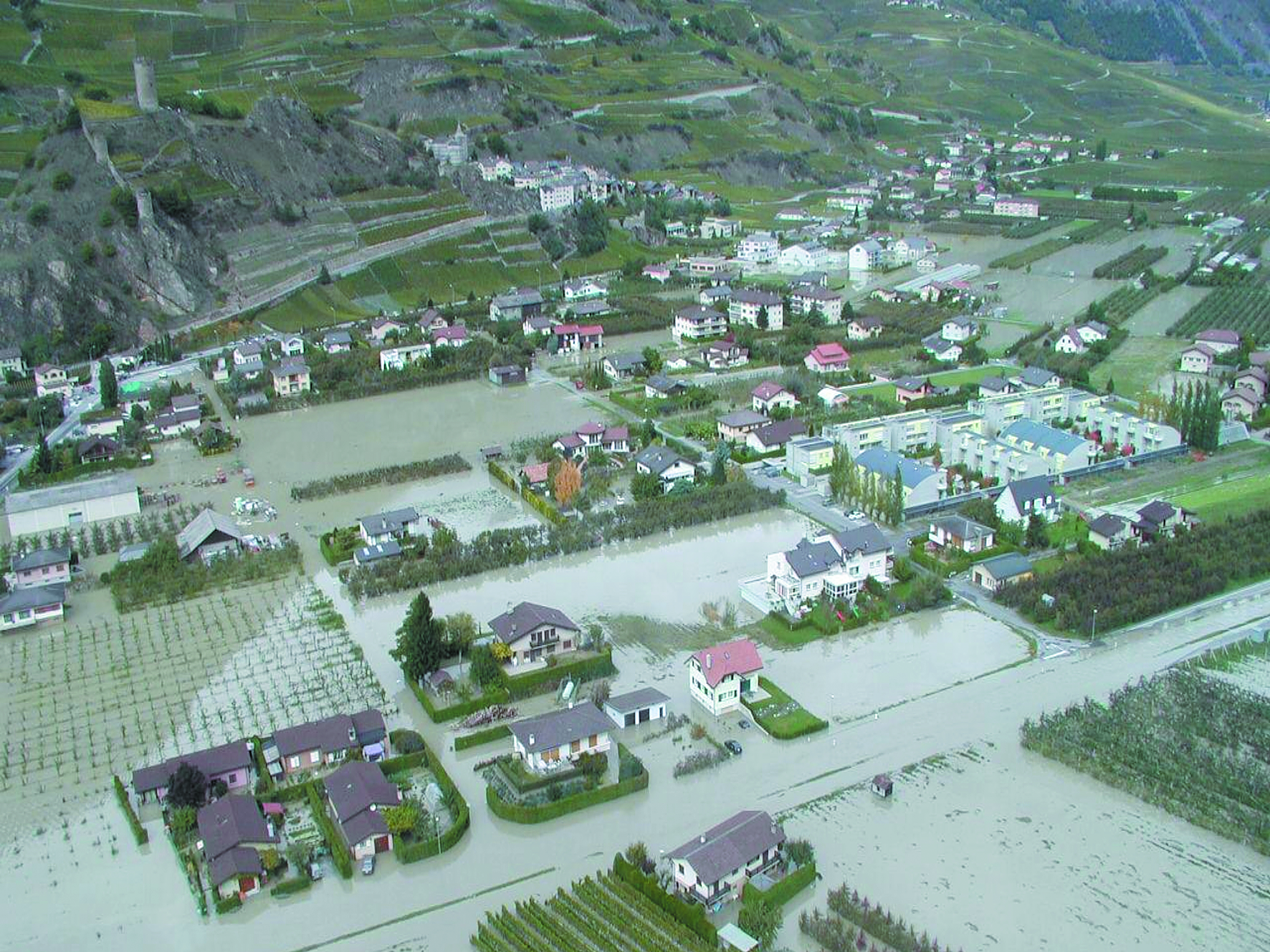
Flood of October 2000 in Saillon (VS).

The risk of flooding from the Rhône is high. The recurrence of very high floods, higher than those used as a basis for defining the cross-section of the Rhone during previous Rhone corrections, together with the strong development of built-up areas, have shown that higher flows than in the past must now be considered to secure the Rhone plain. Hydrological studies indicate that the 100-year flood (occurring on average once every hundred years) has a discharge of 1,260 m^{3}/s at Branson (Fully) and 1,660 m^{3}/s³ at the Porte du Scex, near Lake Geneva. An extreme flood (with a statistical return time of around a thousand years) would have a discharge of 1,600 m^{3}/s at Branson and 2,100 m^{3}/s at the Porte du Scex.

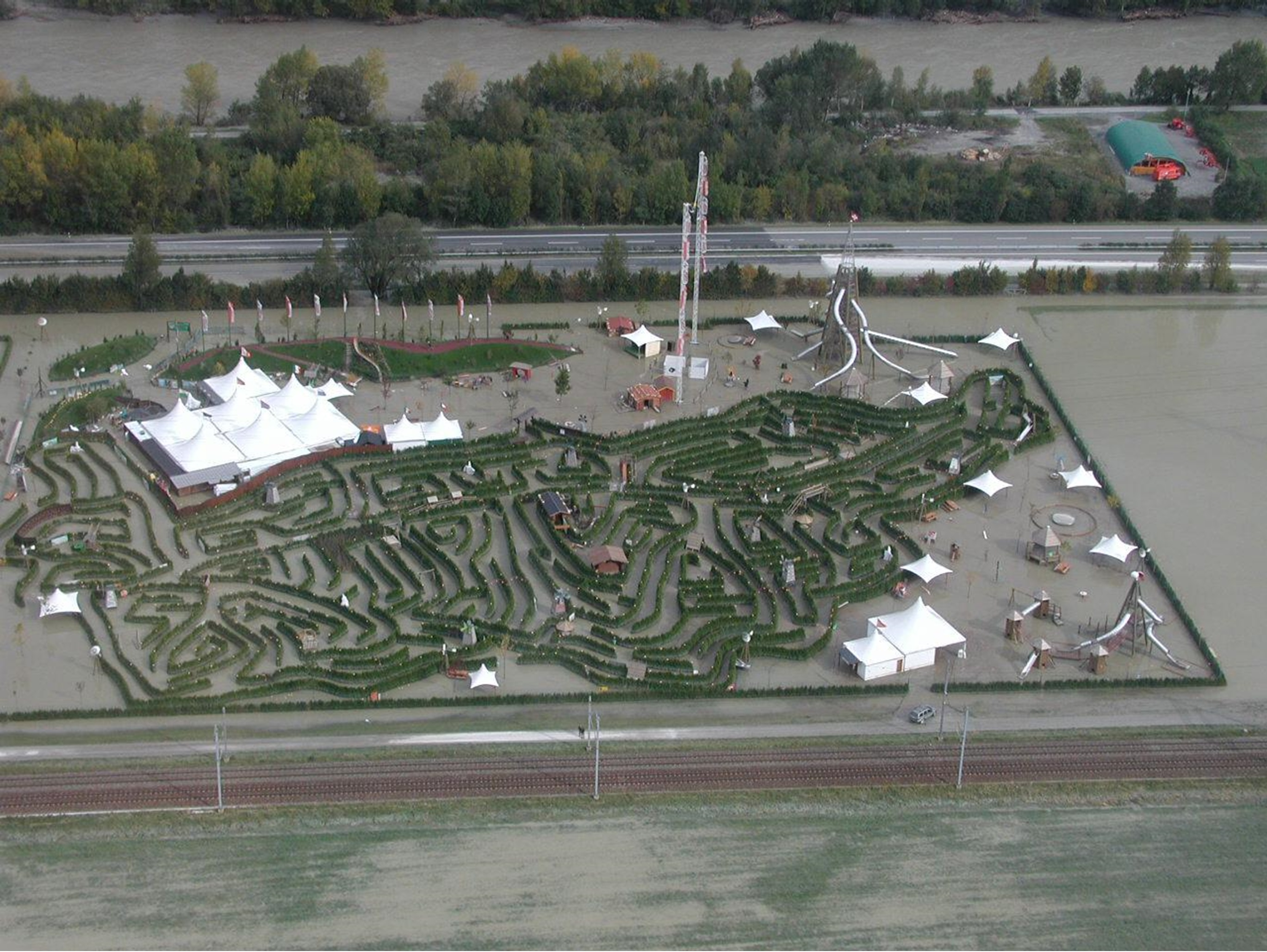
Flood of October 2000 in Evionnaz (VS).

The current layout of the Rhône is no longer able to protect the plain against the 100-year flood defined above, due to the poor condition of the dykes and the inadequate size of the riverbed.

The lack of capacity is due to the insufficient size of the Rhone bed, and not to the deposition of sediment on the riverbed: since the middle of the 20th century, there has been a general trend towards lowering the Rhone bed, due to the sustained activity of gravel pits. Today's dikes date back to the second Rhône correction (1930–1960). They were built over the dikes of the first correction (1863–1884). Today, they are dangerous due to their lack of stability (risk of internal erosion and hydraulic foxing), as well as deterioration caused by tree roots and burrowing animals. This means that dikes can fail even before flooding occurs.

As a result, more than 11,000 hectares of land are currently threatened by flooding in the Rhône plain in Valais, and the cumulative potential damage exceeds ten billion Swiss francs.

=== Hazard management strategy ===
The hazard management principles applied in the 3rd Rhone Correction are based on the lessons learned from the major floods of the late 20th century in Switzerland and are defined in federal and cantonal legislation.

These principles are spelled out in directives, in particular, those published by the Swiss Confederation:

- Assess the hazard situation, by analyzing past events and drawing up a hazard map.
- Differentiate protection goals: objects of greater value should be better protected than those of lesser value. Measures must be technically, economically, and ecologically proportionate to their objectives.
- Create sufficient flow cross-sections to ensure protection against flooding, while reducing the need for interventions to maintain the balance of solid materials and thus ensure the stability of the bed.
- Ensure the operation and resistance of structures in the event of overloading, and provide evacuation corridors for extreme floods.
- Preserve or recreate natural flood retention areas to reduce peak flood levels.
- Ensure maintenance and plan for emergency response.
- Identify and remedy ecological deficits. Sustainable flood protection must ensure that shoreline vegetation thrives and leaves sufficient space for the development of a natural diversity of structures for aquatic, amphibian, and terrestrial life. It creates links between habitats.
- Ensuring adequate space for the watercourse: land use must maintain sufficient distance from the watercourse.

Overall, sustainable protection is ensured by the joint implementation of three types of action.

1. Prevention, covering hazard zones, building regulations (constraints on building applications in hazard zones), and river maintenance.
2. Intervention, including flood forecasting, crisis organization, and evacuation of the population in the areas most at risk.
3. Construction of the 3rd Rhone correction, based on an overall project and providing for the phased implementation of measures according to safety priorities over the next 20 years.

=== Solutions studied ===
Retaining floodwaters in the large Alpine dams in the Rhône watershed provides a safety benefit, but cannot in itself guarantee the safety of the plain. To evacuate floodwaters from the Rhône, water diversion solutions were also studied.

The construction of an underground gallery to evacuate floodwaters from the Rhône was not retained, as such a gallery would have to be excessively large to allow flood evacuation. In addition, this type of infrastructure is unreliable in flood conditions.

The construction of a second channel is a feasible solution, but not a rational one in terms of cost and space, as it requires the creation of two parallel dike systems and takes up more space overall. However, it can be potentially useful in certain cases, when strong constraints prevent intervention on the Rhône or when a secondary canal has to be created to install a hydroelectric dam.

Increased capacity is therefore provided by resizing the river. Three families of solutions were analyzed:

1. Raising the dikes: This type of development was not chosen, as the current dikes are already four to five meters high and threaten the plain. In the event of failure or overflow, they prevent water from flowing back towards the Rhône. Raising them even higher, to 6 meters or more, would increase these problems and transfer them to the tributaries.
2. To manage floods through a pure lowering of the riverbed, the bottom would need to be excavated by several meters. However, this is often no longer feasible as it would significantly lower the water table connected to the Rhône. This would result in substantial soil subsidence, posing high risks of cracks in buildings and infrastructure.
3. This solution requires additional space but allows significant floodwaters to pass without raising the river's water level or disturbing the water table. The future width of the river, referred to as the "regime width", is designed to allow frequent floods to remove vegetation at regular intervals, maintaining flow capacity.

=== Chosen solution ===
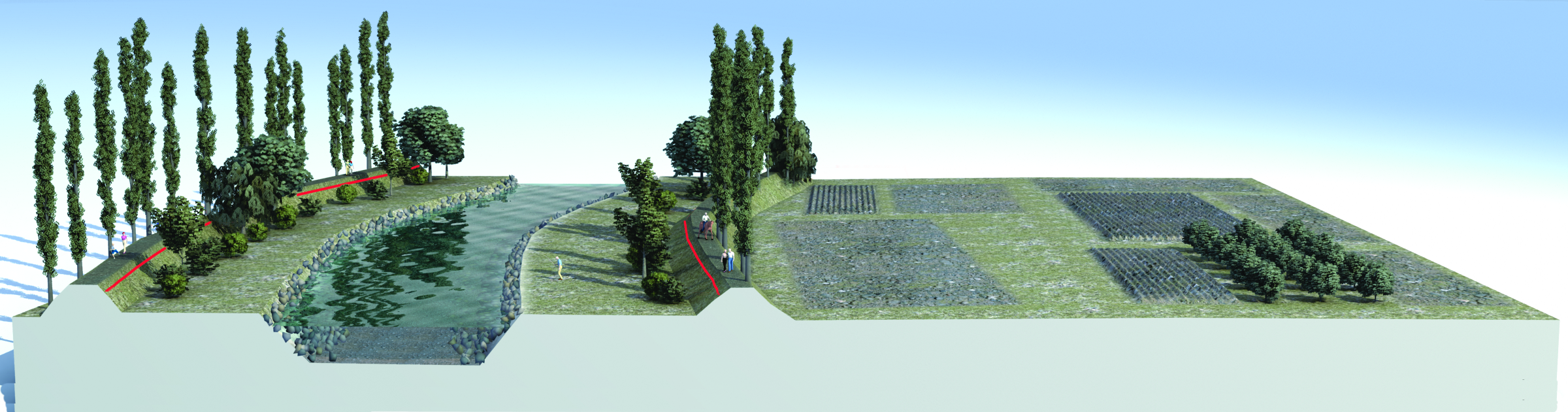
Current state of the Rhône.

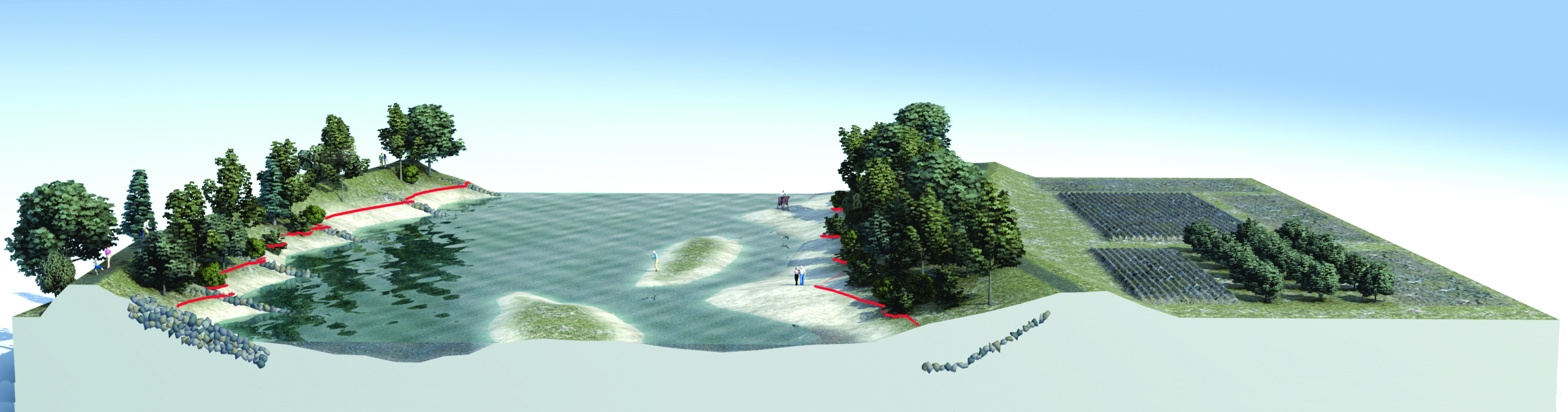
Future developments planned for the Rhône.

The chosen solution combines strengthening the levees with lowering the riverbed and widening the river. The size of the widening is based on safety needs, varying by sector, and corresponds to approximately 50% of the current width. This enables the evacuation of 50% more flow and meets the set safety standards. Localized widenings, two to three times the current width, are also planned. These have a dual function: improving sediment management and fulfilling legal requirements while enhancing the natural environment through safer widening.

In exceptional events that exceed the capacity of the new riverbed, excess flows must also be managed. These flows are diverted into areas known as residual risk management corridors, bordered by overflow-resistant levees and rear levees. The diversion occurs notably in large widened areas, which also serve important social and recreational purposes.

=== Project footprint ===
In the public consultation project presented in 2008, the additional project footprint amounted to 870 hectares in the cantons of Vaud and Valais, including 382 hectares of arable land. This impact on agricultural land was reduced by 70 hectares in the revised project validated in 2012 by the Vaud and Valais cantonal governments.

The impact on agriculture is mitigated through comprehensive land improvements. These include reorganizing the territory by replacing expropriations with parcel exchanges and consolidations, as well as providing opportunities to adapt infrastructure (irrigation, drainage, roads) and improve production conditions.

=== Participatory processes, expert reviews, and political decisions ===
A diagnostic of the current situation, along with the objectives and principles of the third Rhône correction, was summarized in a report in June 2000. It was presented to the Grand Council of Valais, which adopted it in September 2000 and requested an extension of the third correction (initially planned from Brig to Martigny) from Gletsch to Lake Geneva, in collaboration with the Canton of Vaud for the inter-cantonal section.

The project development spanned several years and followed a participatory process. The chosen solution was presented for public consultation in 2008 as part of the planning for the third Rhône correction.

In this context, opponents of the project, particularly from the agricultural sector and concerned about the loss of farmland, as well as some neighboring municipalities, proposed alternative options. These alternatives focused on deepening the river and claimed to offer equivalent safety at a third of the cost, timeframe, and footprint of the proposed project. These alternatives were submitted by the Council of State of the Canton of Valais to two expert panels in 2008 and 2011. Both independent expert groups concluded that the alternatives did not ensure sustainable safety or comply with legal frameworks. Meanwhile, some environmental organizations criticized the project for being insufficiently ecological.

Feedback from the public consultation highlighted two main areas for improvement: the impact on agriculture and project timelines. Consequently, the agricultural footprint was reduced by 70 hectares, and timelines were expedited by adjusting priorities and introducing new early measures, reducing the project duration from 30 to 20 years.

=== Implementation Steps ===
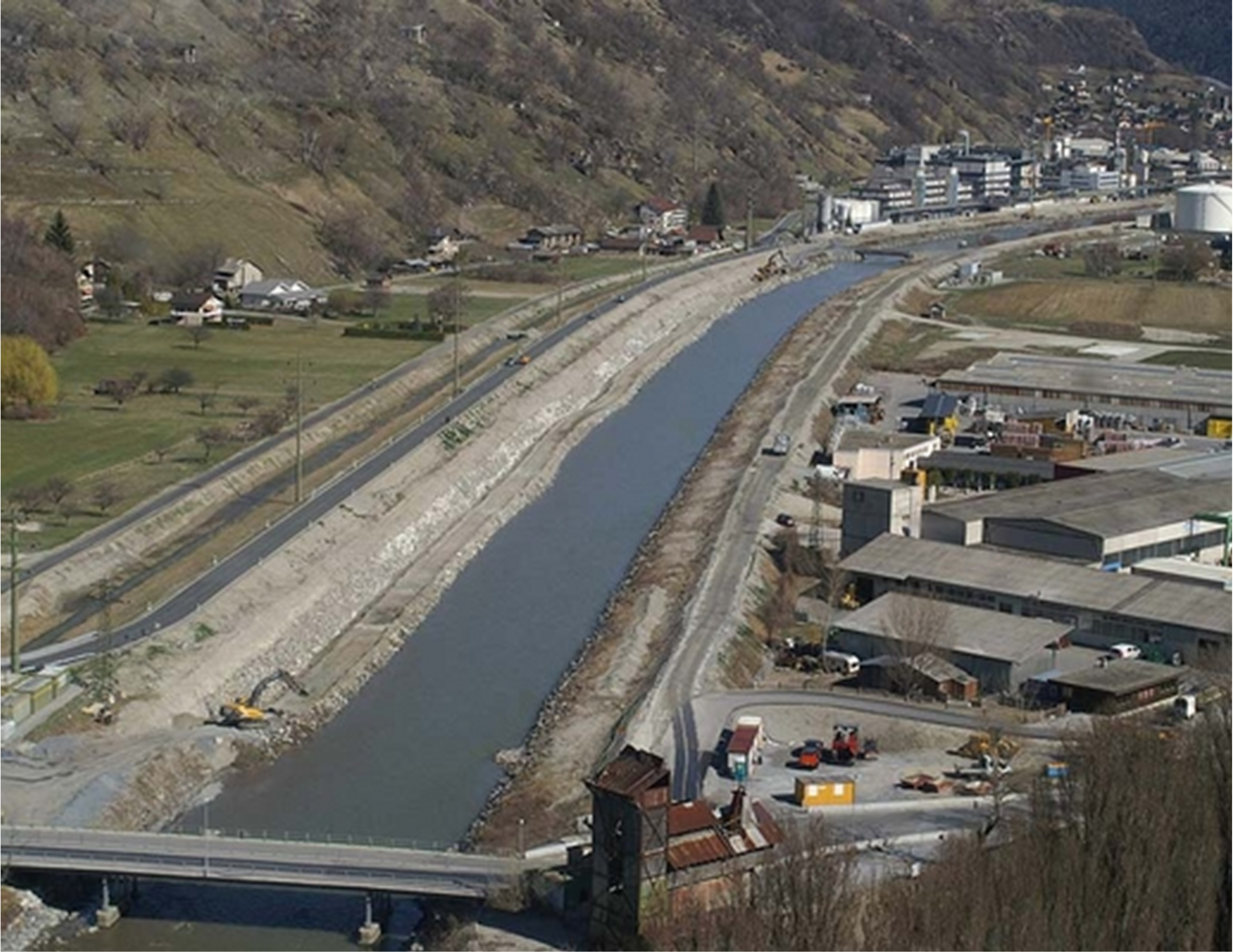
Works in the Visp region.

The implementation of the measures outlined in the development plan for the third Rhône correction began in 2009 in the Visp sector.

It will continue over the next 20 years across other sectors in two stages, prioritized according to the potential extent of damage and the level of danger. Specific targeted measures, referred to as "early measures", are already underway to quickly secure areas with high population density near the levees.

=== Costs and Funding of the Works ===
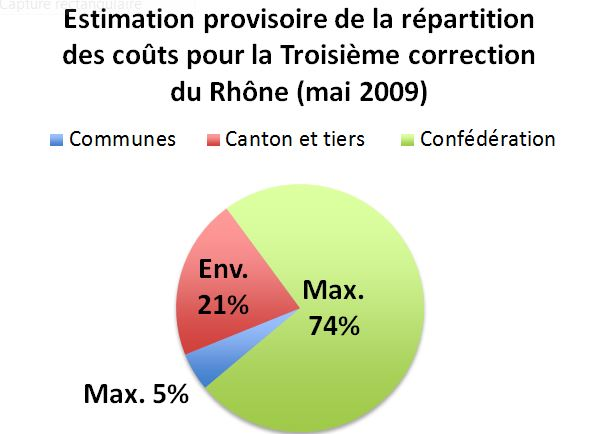
Provisional estimate of the distribution of costs for the Third Rhône Correction. See in "3rd Rhone correction: Federal Council adopts message on 2009-14 financing."

The total cost of the third Rhône correction is estimated at 2.3 billion Swiss francs, excluding VAT. This amount includes civil engineering work for river management and the relocation of infrastructure.

The projected cost of land improvements is around 200 million francs.

Flood protection along the Rhône is the responsibility of the Canton of Valais, which owns the river. The canton benefits from financial support from the Confederation, based on principles outlined in the Watercourse Development Act. Compensation is determined according to criteria related to project quality. The maximum subsidy rate from the Federal Office for Flood Protection is 65%. Additional contributions come from the Federal Roads Office for the protection of the A9 motorway.

In Valais, under cantonal law on watercourse development, municipalities contribute up to 5% of the total recognized project costs.

=== Referendum ===
In September 2014, the Grand Council of the Canton of Valais approved the financing plan for the third Rhône correction by adopting a decree establishing a fund for its financing. Defending the principle, rejected by expert assessments, of prioritizing deepening the river, members of the Swiss People's Party (UDC), joined by representatives of the agricultural sector, launched a referendum against the decree, which had been approved by 98 votes to 24, with 2 abstentions, in the Grand Council. The referendum was submitted to public vote on June 14, 2015, and the financing decree was approved by 57% of voters.

=== Example of Planned Development – Sion Case ===
The city of Sion saw the third Rhône correction as an opportunity to redefine the plain's landscape and its relationship with the river within the perimeter of the Valais capital. The canton and the municipality partnered to outline a vision for future development. An urban planning and architectural competition was held to establish a framework for integrating the river into the city of Sion.

== See also ==
- Hydrology of Switzerland
- Rhine Regulation
- Jura water correction

== Bibliography ==
- Canton du Valais, service des routes et des cours d'eau (2016). Troisième correction du Rhône: sécurité pour le futur [Third Rhône correction: security for the future] (PDF) (in French). Rapport de synthèse du plan d'aménagement.
- Vischer, Daniel L. (2003). Histoire de la protection contre les crues en Suisse [History of flood protection in Switzerland] (in French). Office fédéral de l'environnement OFEV.
- de Torrenté, Charles; de Kalbermatten, Arnold (1964). La correction du Rhône en amont du lac Léman [The correction of the Rhone upstream of Lake Geneva] (in French). Berne: Office fédéral des imprimés et du matériel. p. 136.
- Zryd, Amédée (2008). Les glaciers en mouvement [Moving glaciers] (in French). Lausanne: Presse polytechniques et universitaires romandes. p. 135. ISBN 9782880747701.
