= La Luette =

Mountain in Switzerland

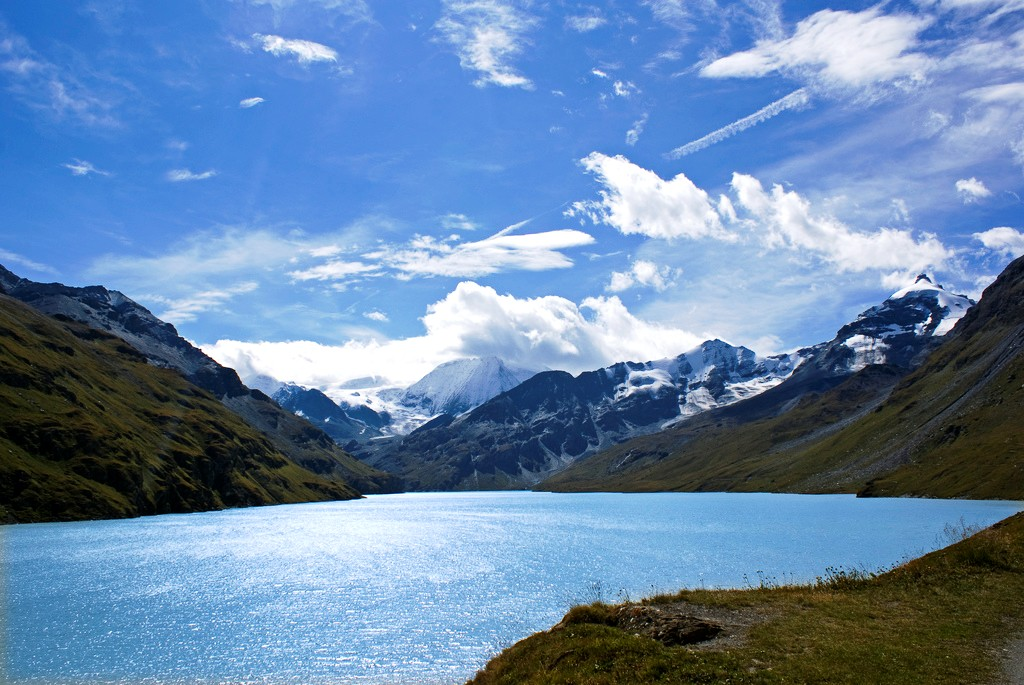
- Mont Blanc de Cheilon center and La Luette (center right) seen from Lac des Dix

Highest point
- Elevation: 3,548 m (11,640 ft)
- Prominence: 179 m (587 ft)
- Parent peak: Le Pleureur
- Coordinates: 46°0′37.2″N 7°23′15.4″E

Geography
- Location within Switzerland
- Location: Valais, Switzerland
- Parent range: Pennine Alps

La Luette is a mountain of the Pennine Alps, located between the valleys of Bagnes and Hérens in the canton of Valais. It lies just south of Le Pleureur.
