= Giétro Glacier =

Glacier in Switzerland

- Glacier du Giétro
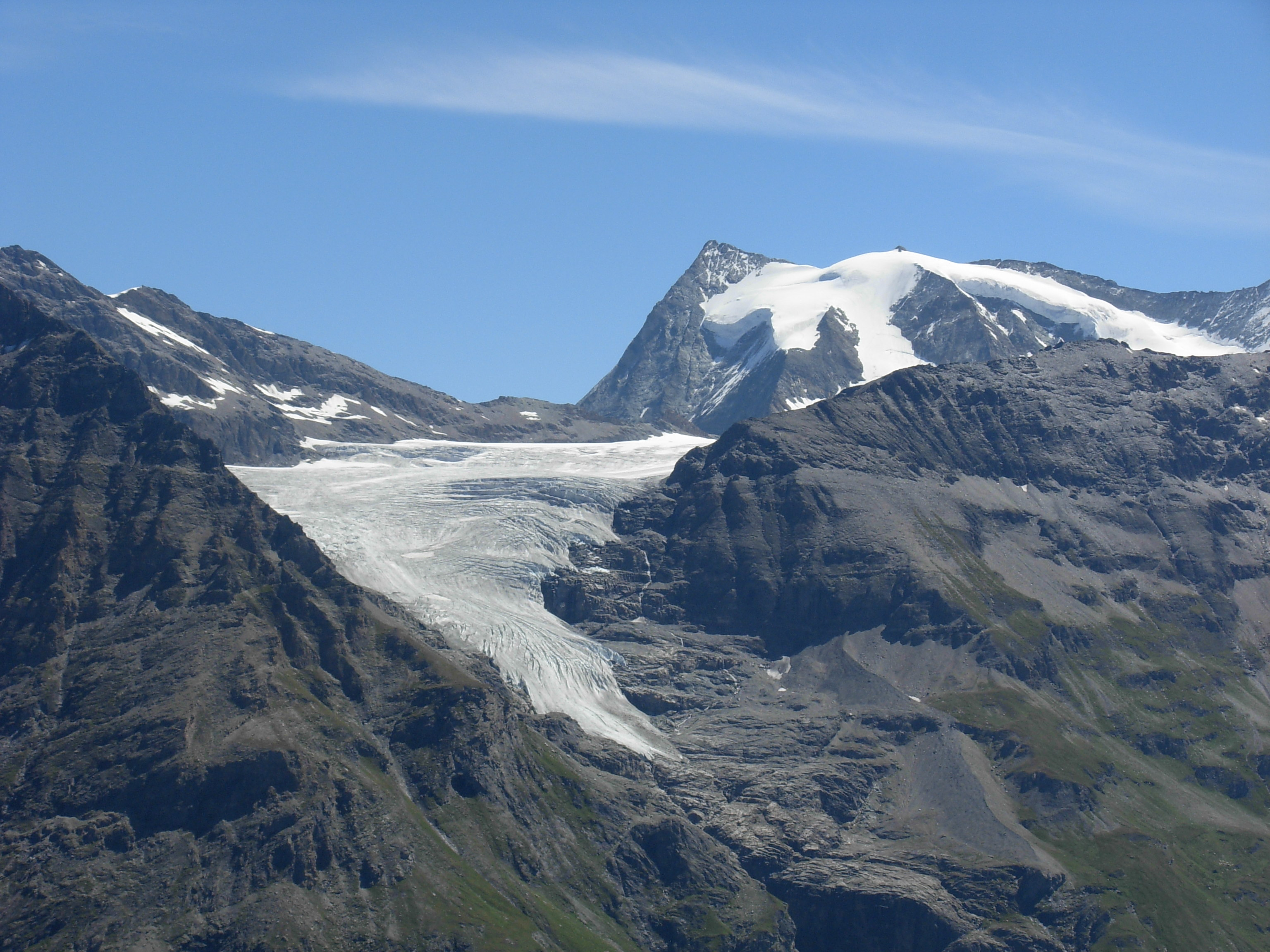
- Giétro Glacier, August 2007
- Interactive map of Giétro Glacier
- Type: Valley glacier
- Location: Valais, Switzerland
- Coordinates: 45°59′42″N 7°23′18″E
- Area: 5.3 km^{2} (2.0 sq mi)
- Length: 4.45 km (2.77 mi)
- Highest elevation: 3,820 m (12,530 ft)
- Lowest elevation: 2,750 m (9,020 ft)
- Status: Receding

The Giétro Glacier or Giétroz Glacier (French: Glacier du Giétro) is a 4 km (2.5 mi) long valley glacier located in south-western Switzerland. The 1818 Giétro Glacier catastrophe, which led to a lake outburst flood, is one of the worst disasters in the history of the Swiss Alps.

== Description ==
The Giétro Glacier lies on the northern side of the Pennine Alps in the Swiss canton of Valais. It is located in the upper Bagnes Valley, south of Martigny and Verbier. The length of the glacier in 2017 was 4.45 km (2.77 mi) and its area was 5.3 km^{2} (2.0 sq mi).

The glacier is fed by snows from Mont Blanc de Cheilon at 3,870 m (12,700 ft) high and La Ruinette at 3,875 m (12,713 ft) high. On the upper part, the glacier is relatively flat. It descends to the north on the side of Mont Rouge du Giétro and then curves to the west between Le Pleureur and Mont Rouge. On the lower part, the glacier reaches a steepness of 40% forming a large number of crevasses. The terminus is located at about 2,750 m (9,020 ft). Part of the glacier is linked to the Cheilon Glacier through the Col du Cheilon which is 3,243 m (10,640 ft) high. The water from the glacier melt ends in the artificial lake of Lake Mauvoisin and from there drains into the Dranse de Bagnes, a tributary of the Rhone.

== Glacier catastrophes ==
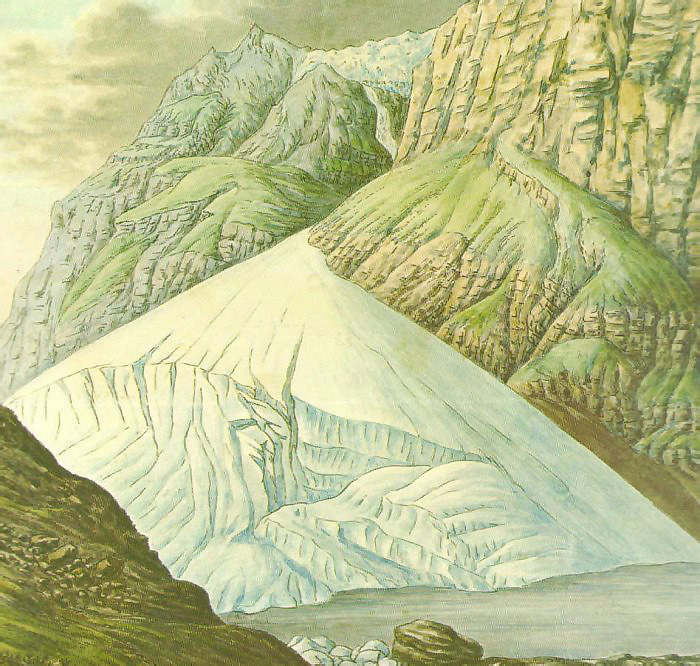
The ice cone which obstructed the valley in 1818 (by Arnold Escher von der Linth)

The Giétro Glacier is known to have caused many deaths in the valley during historical times. The earliest known glacial lake outburst flood was recorded in 1595, and caused 140 deaths. More recently in 1818 a similar lake outburst flood occurred killing 44 people. In the latter case a hole was drilled through the glacier to limit the level of the waters.

After an increase of the glacier during the "Year Without a Summer", an ice cone started to form in 1816 in the valley. It was created by the accumulation of the falling seracs of the terminus. A lake was formed but it emptied on 27 May 1817 without causing any fatalities. In April 1818 the lake measured about 2 km (1.2 mi) in length. On 10 May 1818, the engineer Ignaz Venetz was called by the canton. To stop the rapid rise of waters, he decided to drill a hole through the ice. The work began one day later. A tunnel was drilled from the two sides, about 20 metres above the level of the lake. An avalanche of ice occurred on 18 May but without any casualties. A secondary tunnel was then drilled for safety reasons. A week later the level of the lake reached 10 metres below the tunnel. On 27 May an enormous piece of ice detached itself from the cone in the lake and floated to the surface while making terrible noise; everybody escaped. They went back to work two days later. The 198 metre-long hole was completed on 4 June. Other large pieces of ice detached from the cone and floated back. The waters finally reached the level of the hole on 13 June, 22:00. They continued to rise until 14 June, when the level of the lake began to fall because of the erosion of the hole by the waterfall. Some water also ran out from the base of the cone. Only two men stayed in place; Venetz warned the inhabitants of the valley of the danger. On the morning of 16 June, terrible noises and violent detonations were heard. The cone began to crack. A group of British tourists and a drawer from Lausanne visited the place with Venetz. In the afternoon, Venetz and the workers escaped to the heights of Fionnay.

Finally, at 16:30, the dam broke and 18,000,000 m^{3} (640,000,000 cu ft) of water invaded the valley. Half an hour later the lake was empty. The flood reached the village of Bagnes 10 minutes later; the alert was given to Martigny before 18:00, but too late. The wave invaded Martigny-Bourg a few minutes later. The rise of the waters was observed along the Rhone, at 19:00 in Saint-Maurice and at 23:00 on Lake Geneva.

== See also ==
- List of glaciers in Switzerland
