= Mauvoisin Dam =

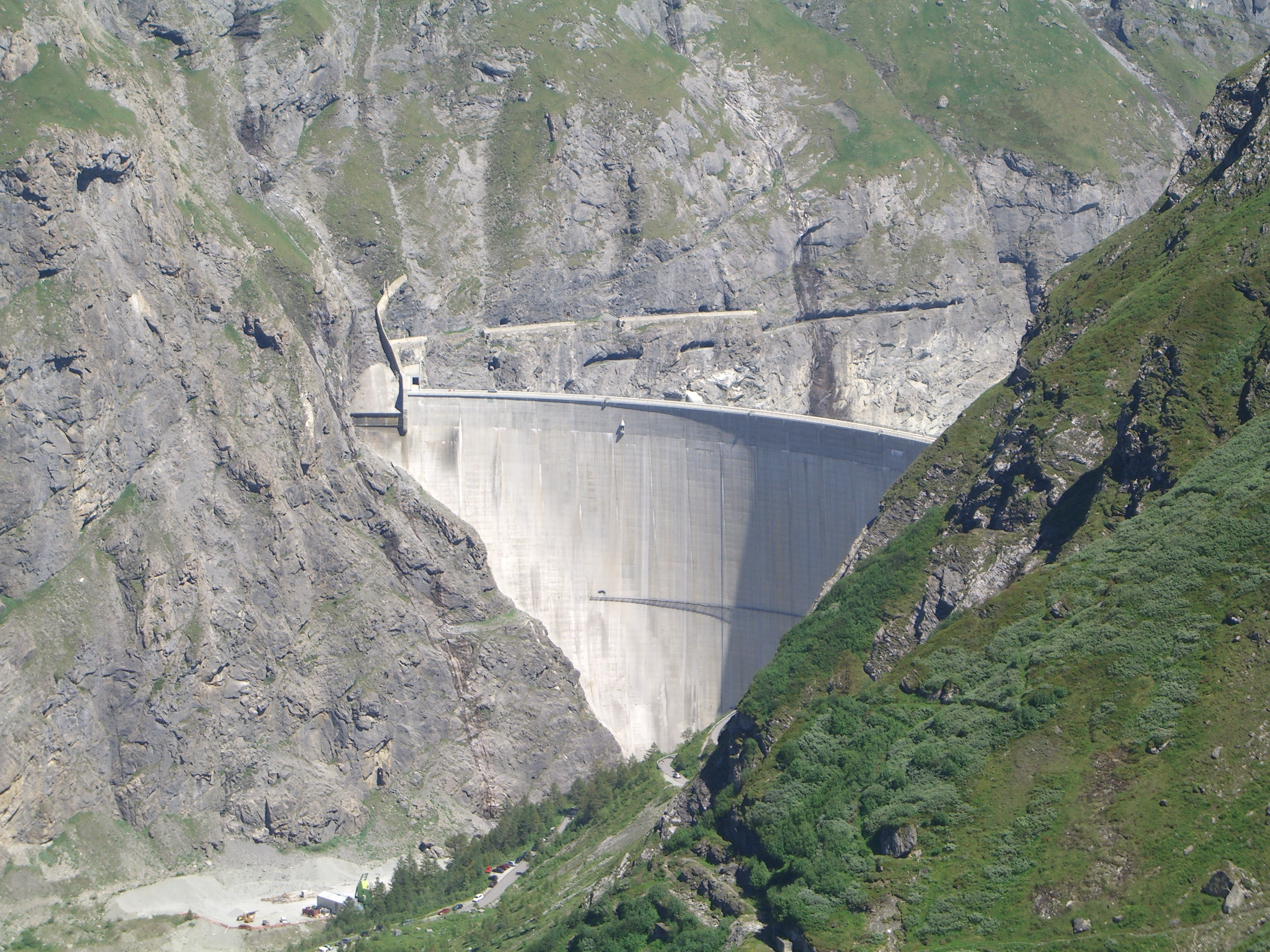
- Interactive map of Mauvoisin Dam
- Location: Valais, Switzerland
- Coordinates: 45°59′53″N 07°20′57″E
- Construction began: 1951; 75 years ago
- Opening date: 1957; 69 years ago
- Owner: Forces Motrices de Mauvoisin SA

Dam and spillways
- Type of dam: Concrete variable radius arch
- Impounds: Dranse de Bagnes
- Height: 250 m (820 ft)
- Length: 520 m (1,710 ft)

Reservoir
- Total capacity: 211,500,000 m^{3} (171,500 acre⋅ft)
- Catchment area: 167 km^{2} (64 mi^{2})
- Surface area: 208 ha (510 acres)

Power Station
- Turbines: 3x 46 MW; 5x 45 MW
- Installed capacity: 363 MW
- Annual generation: 943 million KWh

Mauvoisin Dam is a concrete variable radius arch dam across the Val de Bagnes on the Dranse de Bagnes stream, in the canton of Valais, Switzerland. Initial construction on the dam commenced in 1951 and was completed in 1957, with the reservoir filling by 1958. In 1991, the dam was raised to increase the capacity of the reservoir for winter storage. The dam's primary purpose is hydroelectric power generation.

The eighth highest dam in the world, Mauvoisin stands 250 metres (820 ft) high and 520 metres (1,710 ft) long, with a structural volume of 2,030,000 cubic metres (2,660,000 yd^{3}). The impounded water behind the dam forms the 4.9-kilometre (3.0 mi) Lac de Mauvoisin, which has a capacity of 211.5 million m^{3} (171,500 acre feet) and a full surface area of 208 hectares (510 acres). The dam and reservoir control runoff from a catchment of 167 square kilometres (64 mi^{2}). Flood waters are released by a gated spillway with a capacity of 107 m^{3}/s (3,800 cu ft/s).

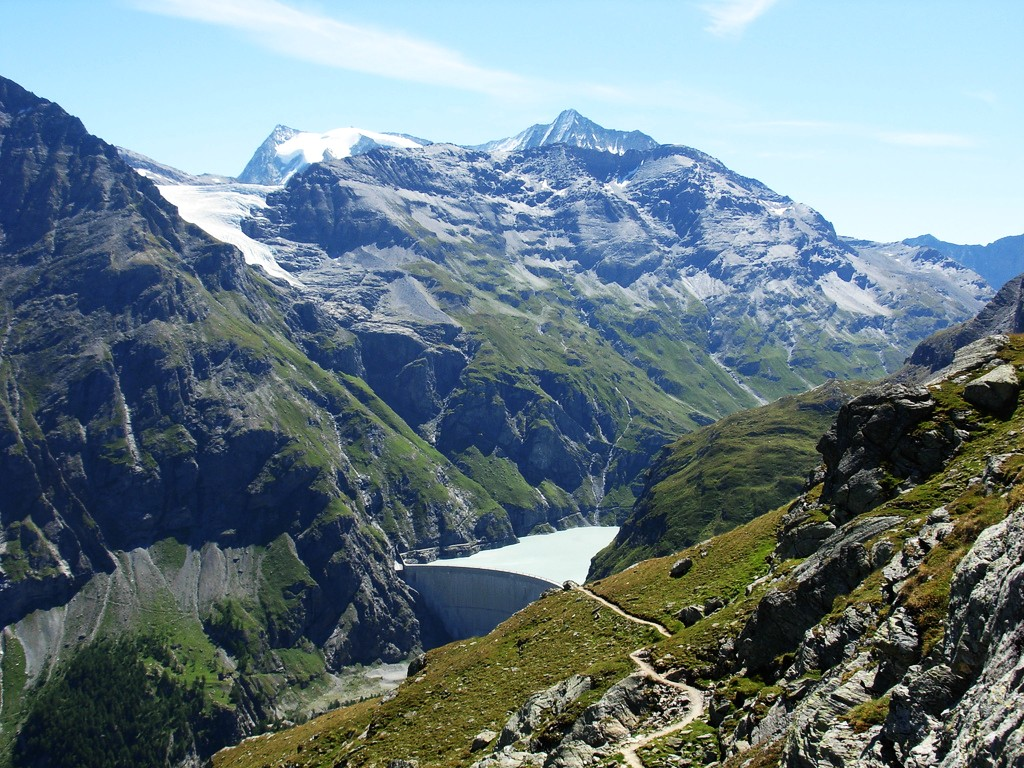
The dam seen with Mont Blanc de Cheilon (left background)

Water from the dam is fed to two hydroelectric power stations with a combined capacity of 363 megawatts (MW). Mauvoisin Dam provides a hydraulic head of 482 m (1,581 ft) to the Fionnay generating station, which can produce 138 MW from three Francis turbines. The water then drops another 1,014 m (3,327 ft) to the Riddes generating station, where it drives five Pelton turbines with a combined capacity of 225 MW. The two plants produce about 943 million kilowatt hours (KWh) each year, with Fionnay generating 278 million KWh (29.5%) and Riddes generating 665 million KWh (70.5%).

Mauvoisin Dam also serves for flood prevention and sediment control. The dam helps protect the Bagnes and Rhône river valleys from glacial lake outburst floods such as ones that occurred in 1595 and 1818. During the 1960s and 1970s, Giétro Glacier adjacent to Lac de Mauvoisin threatened to produce icefalls, which could have overtopped the dam. Giétro has retreated since 1980, eliminating the threat of such an event. The dam also traps about 300,000 m^{3} (390,000 yd^{3}) of sediment each year, helping to extend the life of downstream hydroelectric plants. However, sediment accumulation also poses a threat to the dam's useful life; a project to remove sediment has been proposed but has not been implemented because of safety concerns.

In 2016, the dam was the location of the world-record highest successful basketball shot. 28-year-old Australian Derek Herron (from the YouTube channel How Ridiculous) launched a basketball from the top of the dam, where it fell 180 metres (590 ft) directly into a net placed on the ground below.

== See also ==
- List of tallest dams in Switzerland
