= Le Pleureur =

Mountain in Switzerland

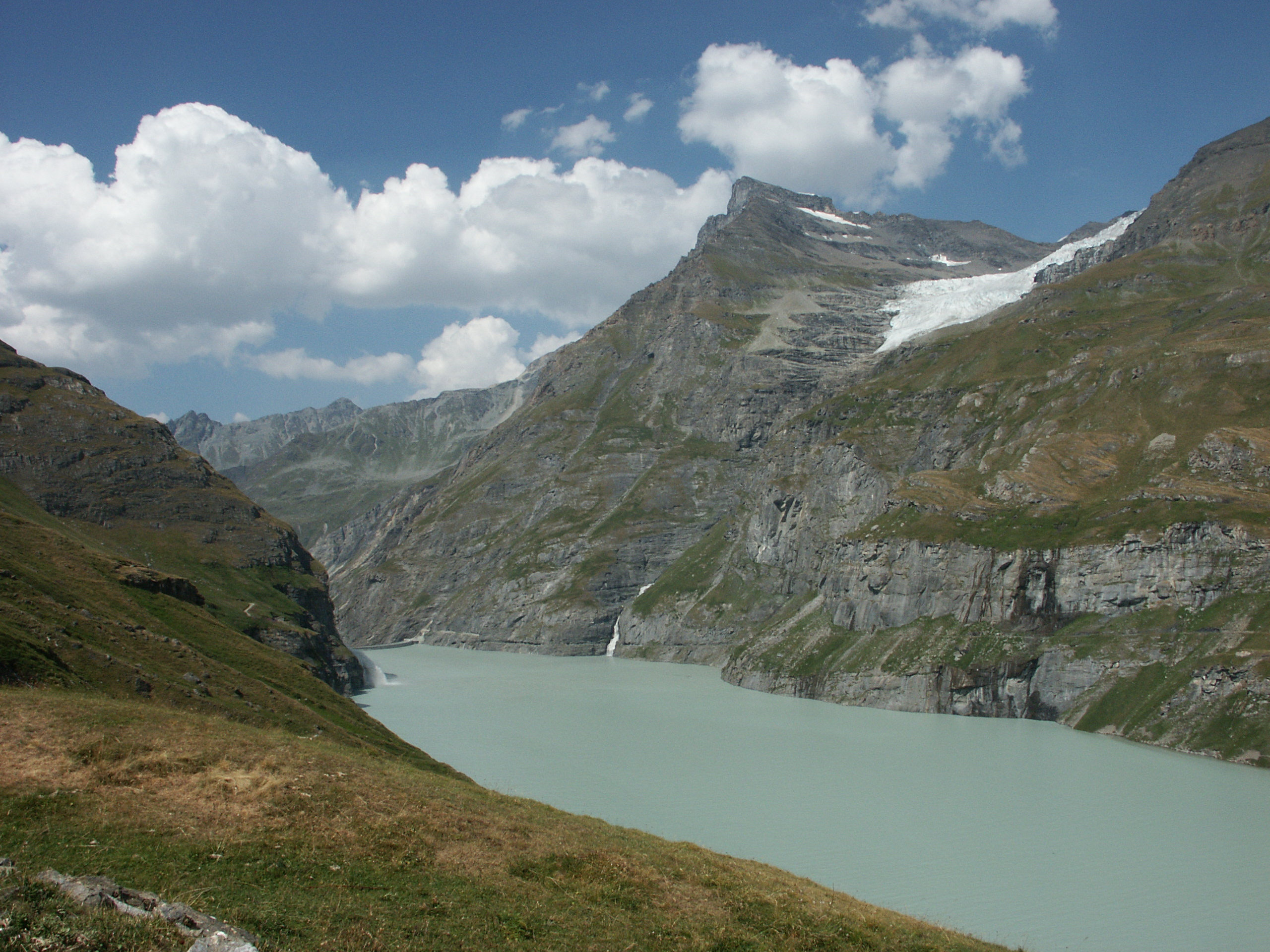
- Le Pleureur and the Giétro Glacier (right)

Highest point
- Elevation: 3,704 m (12,152 ft)
- Prominence: 467 m (1,532 ft)
- Parent peak: La Ruinette
- Listing: Alpine mountains above 3000 m
- Coordinates: 46°00′58.5″N 07°22′9.4″E

Geography
- Location within Switzerland
- Location: Valais, Switzerland
- Parent range: Pennine Alps

Le Pleureur (3,704 m) is a mountain of the Pennine Alps. It is located in Valais, between Lac de Mauvoisin and Lac des Dix.

== See also ==
- List of mountains of Switzerland
