= Cheilon Glacier =

Glacier in Switzerland

- Glacier de Cheilon
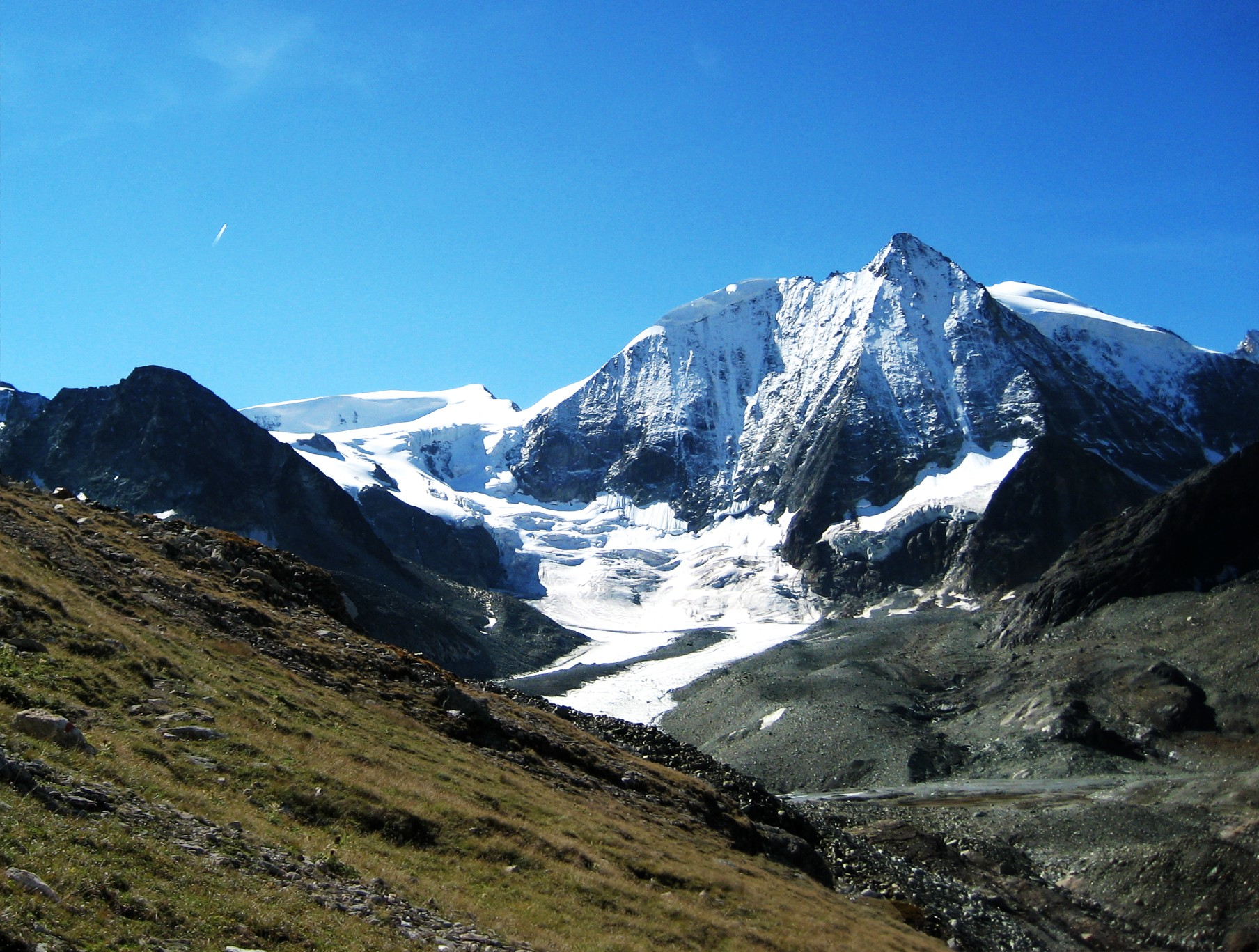
- Glacier de Cheilon and Mont Blanc de Cheilon
- Interactive map of Cheilon Glacier
- Location: Valais, Switzerland
- Coordinates: 46°0′43″N 7°25′30″E
- Length: 3 km

The Cheilon Glacier (French: Glacier de Cheilon) is a 3 km long glacier (2005) situated in the Pennine Alps in the canton of Valais in Switzerland. In 1973 it had an area of 4.56 km^{2}.

== See also ==
- List of glaciers in Switzerland
- Swiss Alps
