= Raphael Ritz =

Swiss painter (1829–1894)

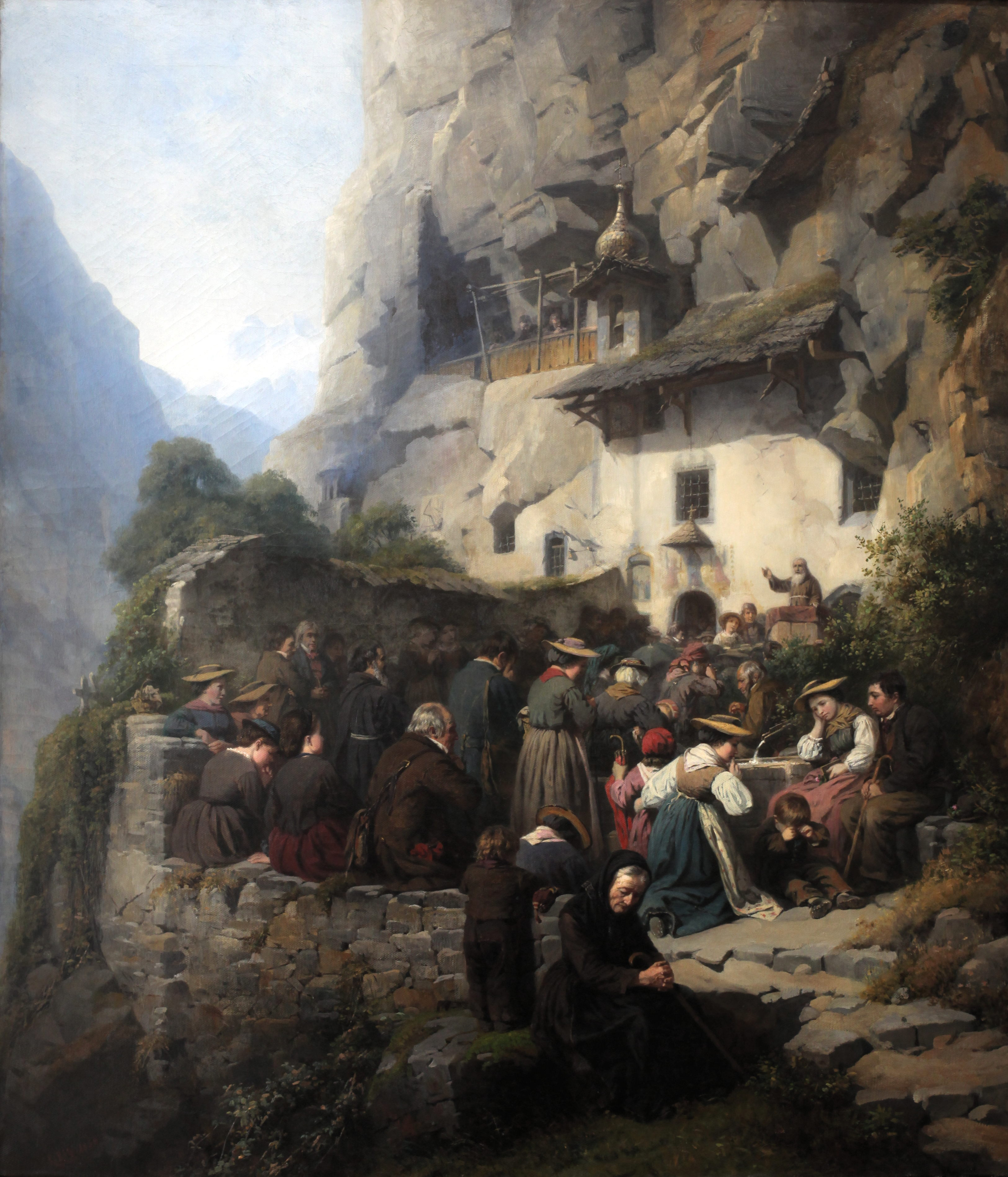
Pilgrimage to Longeborgne

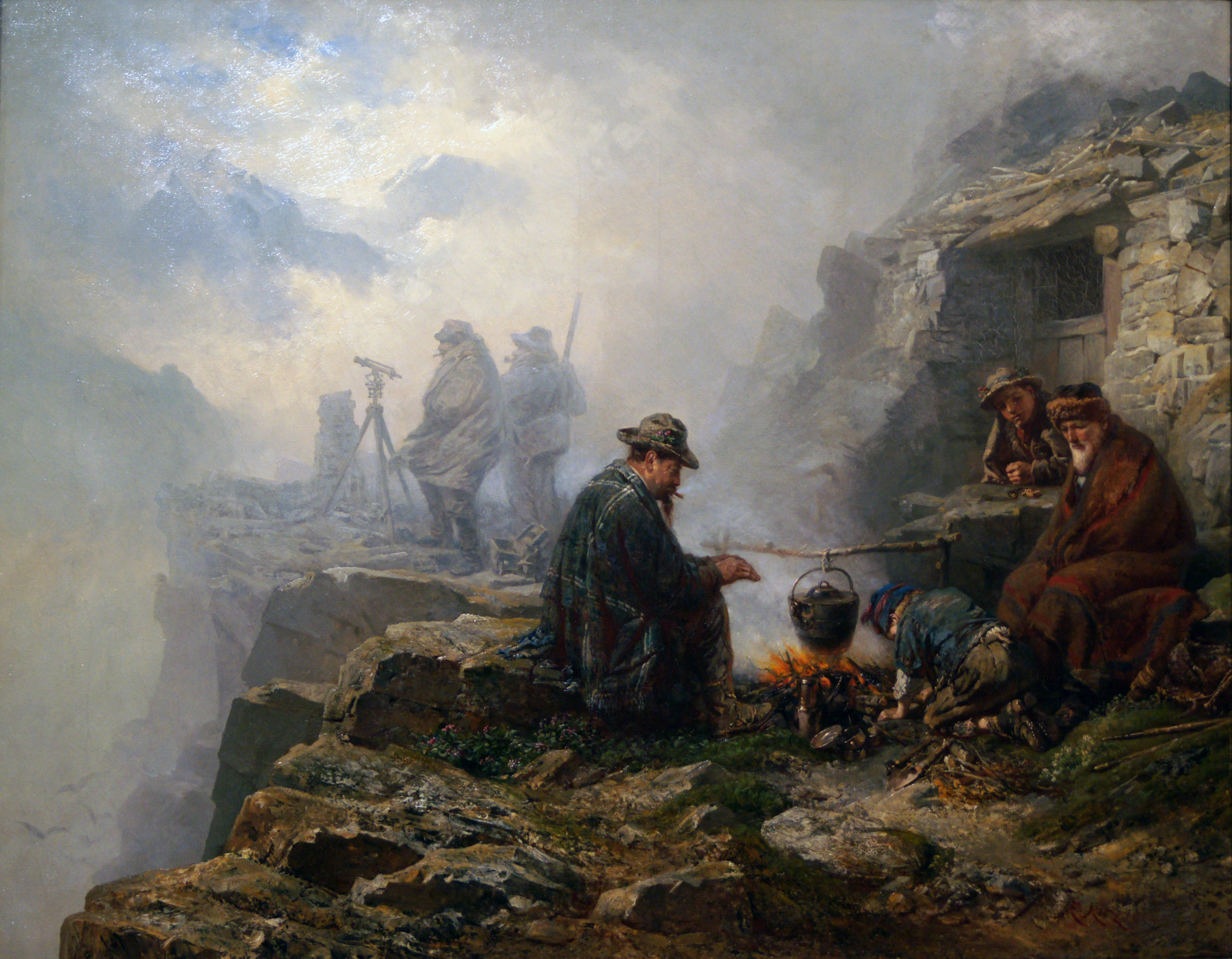
Engineers in the Mountains

Maria Joseph Franz Anton Raphael Ritz, nicknamed Alpen-Raphael or Walliser-Raphael (17 January 1829, in Brig, Canton of Valais – 11 April 1894, in Sion) was a Swiss genre and landscape painter, associated with the Düsseldorf School.

== Biography ==
He was the second of four children born to Lorenz Justin Ritz, a church and portrait painter, and his wife Josefa-Klara. In 1839, they moved from Brig to Sion and his mother died in 1842. He received his first drawing lessons from his father. From 1851 to 1853, he studied with his uncle, Heinrich Kaiser, who was also a church and portrait painter.

His father was displeased with his interest in landscape painting and, as he had also expressed an interest in science during his secondary education, it was suggested that he pursue that course, rather than art. However, he came in contact with the Nazarene painters Paul von Deschwanden and Theodor von Deschwanden (1826–1861) and, on the basis of their advice, enrolled at the Kunstakademie Düsseldorf. He was there from 1853 to 1856. His instructors included Heinrich Mücke, Karl Ferdinand Sohn, Friedrich Wilhelm Schadow and Theodor Hildebrandt.

After 1860, he worked in the studios of Rudolf Jordan, who introduced him to genre painting with folk life motifs. In 1862, he had his first major success when one of his works was purchased by Kaiser Wilhelm I at an exhibition in Brussels. This enabled him to open his own studio in Düsseldorf. He was only there for a year, however, when his father's worsening health forced him to return home and assist with the creation of several altarpieces. After returning to Düsseldorf, he fell ill himself and decided to go back to Sion permanently.

In the following years, he not only painted, but also wrote numerous works on biology, geology, archaeology and folklore. Many of these writings were published in the yearbooks of the Schweizer Alpen-Club, of which he was a member. In 1874, he stayed at a spa in Albisbrunn where he met and married Caroline Nördlinger, the daughter of an engineer from Tübingen. They had five children, including the mathematician and physicist, Walther Ritz. He was later involved in the creation of the Swiss National Museum and was a member of several groups devoted to historical preservation.

An unspecified illness began to afflict him in 1889 and it led to his death in 1894.
