= Lac de Mauvoisin =

Reservoir in Valais, Switzerland

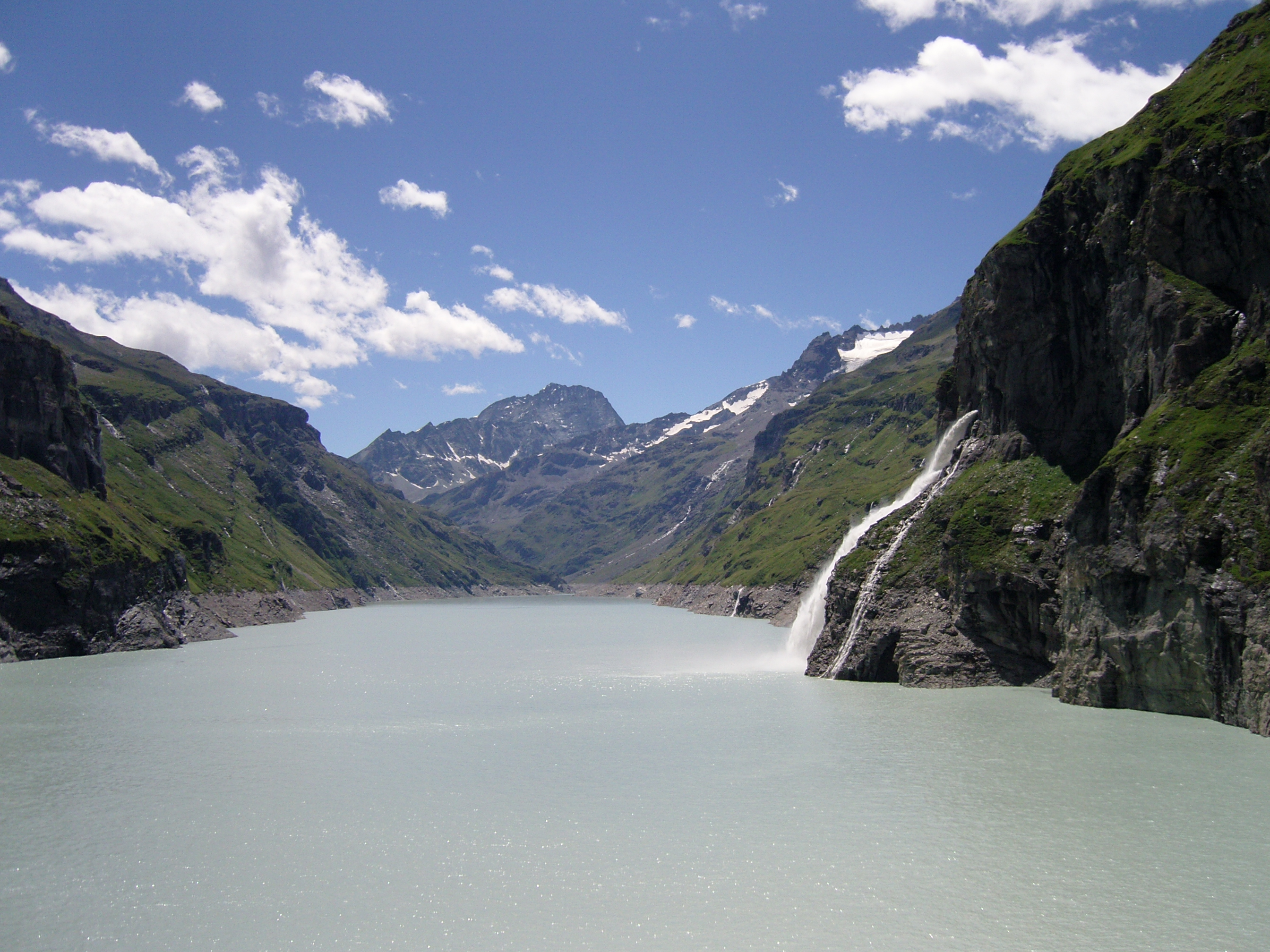
- View of the lake from the dam, July 2008

- Location within Canton of Valais Location within Switzerland Location within Alps
- Interactive map of Lac de Mauvoisin
- Location: Valais
- Coordinates: 45°59′53″N 7°20′58″E
- Type: reservoir
- Primary outflows: Dranse de Bagnes
- Catchment area: 113.5 km^{2} (43.8 sq mi)
- Basin countries: Switzerland
- Max. length: 4.9 km (3.0 mi)
- Surface area: 2.08 km^{2} (0.80 sq mi)
- Max. depth: 180 m (590 ft)
- Surface elevation: 1,961 m (6,434 ft)

Lac de Mauvoisin (French pronunciation: [lak də movwazɛ̃]) is a reservoir in the canton of Valais, Switzerland. The reservoir is formed by the Mauvoisin Dam, which is 250 metres (820 ft) high. The dam is the 11th highest in the world, and the 6th highest arch dam. It was built in 1951–1957, and raised by 13.5 metres (44 ft) in 1991.

The reservoir lies in the upper Val de Bagnes, between the massif of the Grand Combin, one of the highest mountains of the Alps, and La Ruinette. The highest peak visible from the lake is the Combin de la Tsessette (4,135 metres (13,566 ft)).

== Gallery ==
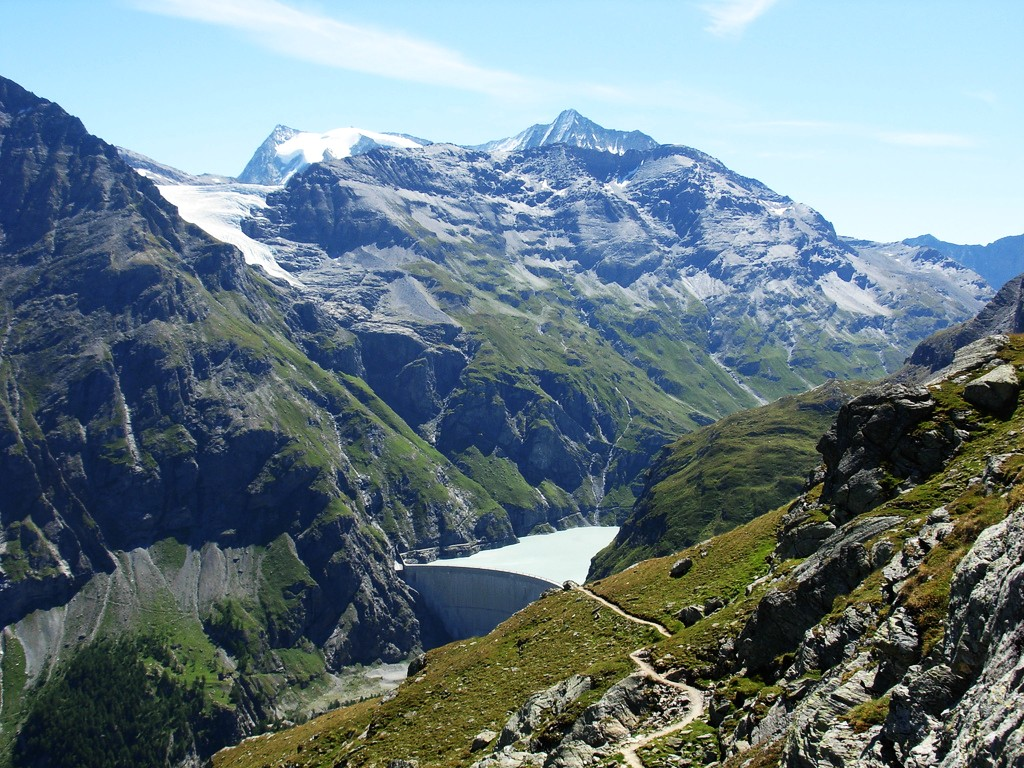
Mauvoisin Dam, with Mont Blanc de Cheilon in the background

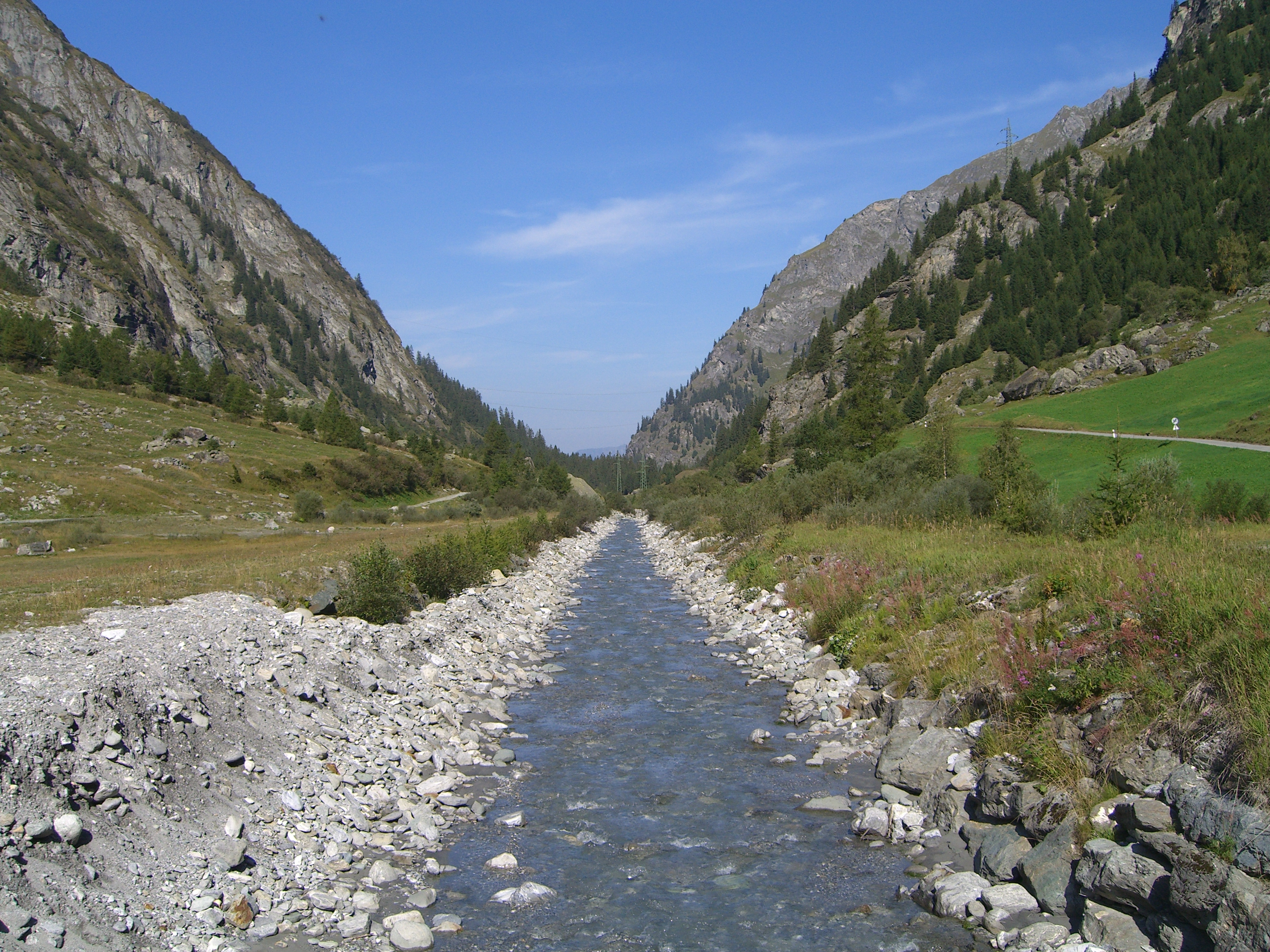
Dranse de Bagnes, a stream flowing from the Mauvoisin lake

== See also ==
- List of lakes of Switzerland
- List of mountain lakes of Switzerland
