= Ignaz Venetz =

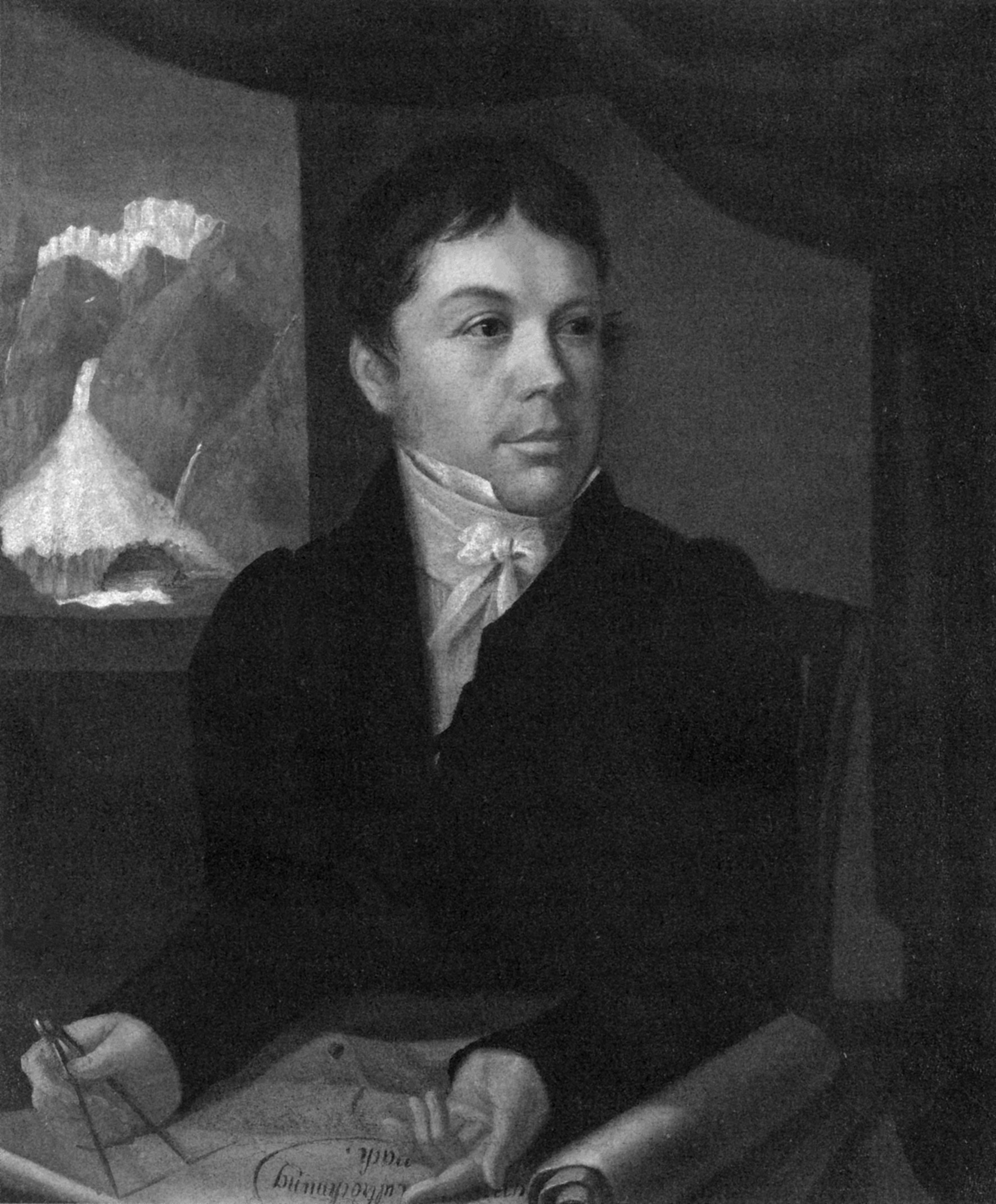
- Ignaz Venetz
- Born: 21 March 1788; Visperterminen, Switzerland
- Died: 20 April 1859 (aged 71)
- Citizenship: Swiss
- Known for: Glaciology
- Scientific career
- Author abbrev. (botany): Venetz

Ignaz (Ignace) Venetz (1788 — 1859) was a Swiss engineer, naturalist, and glaciologist; as one of the first scientists to recognize glaciers as a major force in shaping the earth, he played a leading role in the foundation of glaciology.

== Biography ==
Venetz was of a family long settled in the Valais, where he worked as cantonal engineer first for Valais and then for Vaud. As cantonal engineer he directed the ultimately unsuccessful attempt to drain the ice-dammed lake that had formed following the volcanic winter of 1816 high in the Val de Bagnes; the ice dam failed catastrophically on 16 June 1818. He worked primarily in the Valais canton area of the western Alps. In 1821 he completed the first draft of his work "Mémoire sur les Variations de la température dans les Alpes de la Suisse", suggesting that much of Europe had at one point in the past been covered by glaciers. The book was published in 1833 after additional research in the Swiss Alps, seven years before Louis Agassiz published his famous work Étude sur les glaciers (Study on Glaciers).
