= La Ruinette =

Mountain in Switzerland

- Aerial view of La Ruinette from the south

Highest point
- Elevation: 3,875 m (12,713 ft)
- Prominence: 860 m (2,820 ft)
- Parent peak: Monte Rosa
- Listing: Alpine mountains above 3000 m
- Coordinates: 45°58′44.8″N 7°24′1.3″E

Geography
- Location within Switzerland
- Location: Valais, Switzerland
- Parent range: Pennine Alps

La Ruinette is a mountain of the Swiss Pennine Alps, overlooking the Lake of Mauvoisin in the canton of Valais. With an altitude of 3,875 metres above sea level, it is the highest summit between the Grand Combin and the Dent Blanche. La Ruinette lies close to the better known Mont Blanc de Cheilon which has almost the same height (3,870 m).

Aerial view of the northwest face

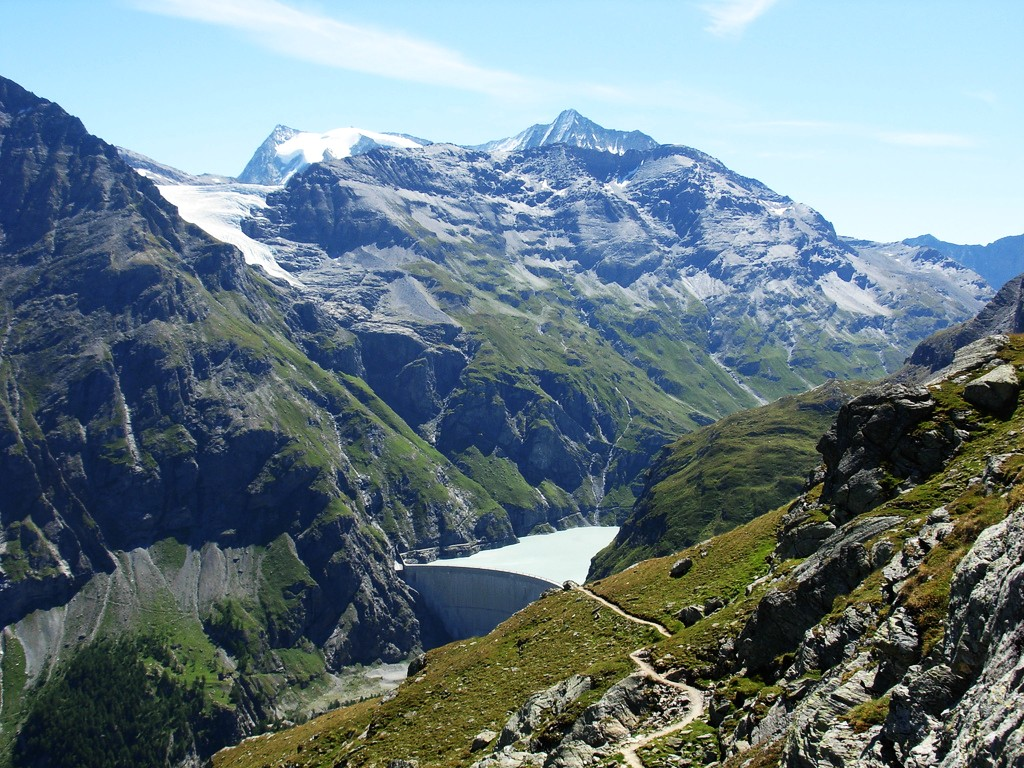
La Ruinette (centre right) and Mont Blanc de Cheilon (left) with the Lac de Mauvoisin

== See also ==
- List of mountains of the Alps above 3000 m
- List of mountains of Switzerland
