= Mont Blanc de Cheilon =

Mountain in Switzerland

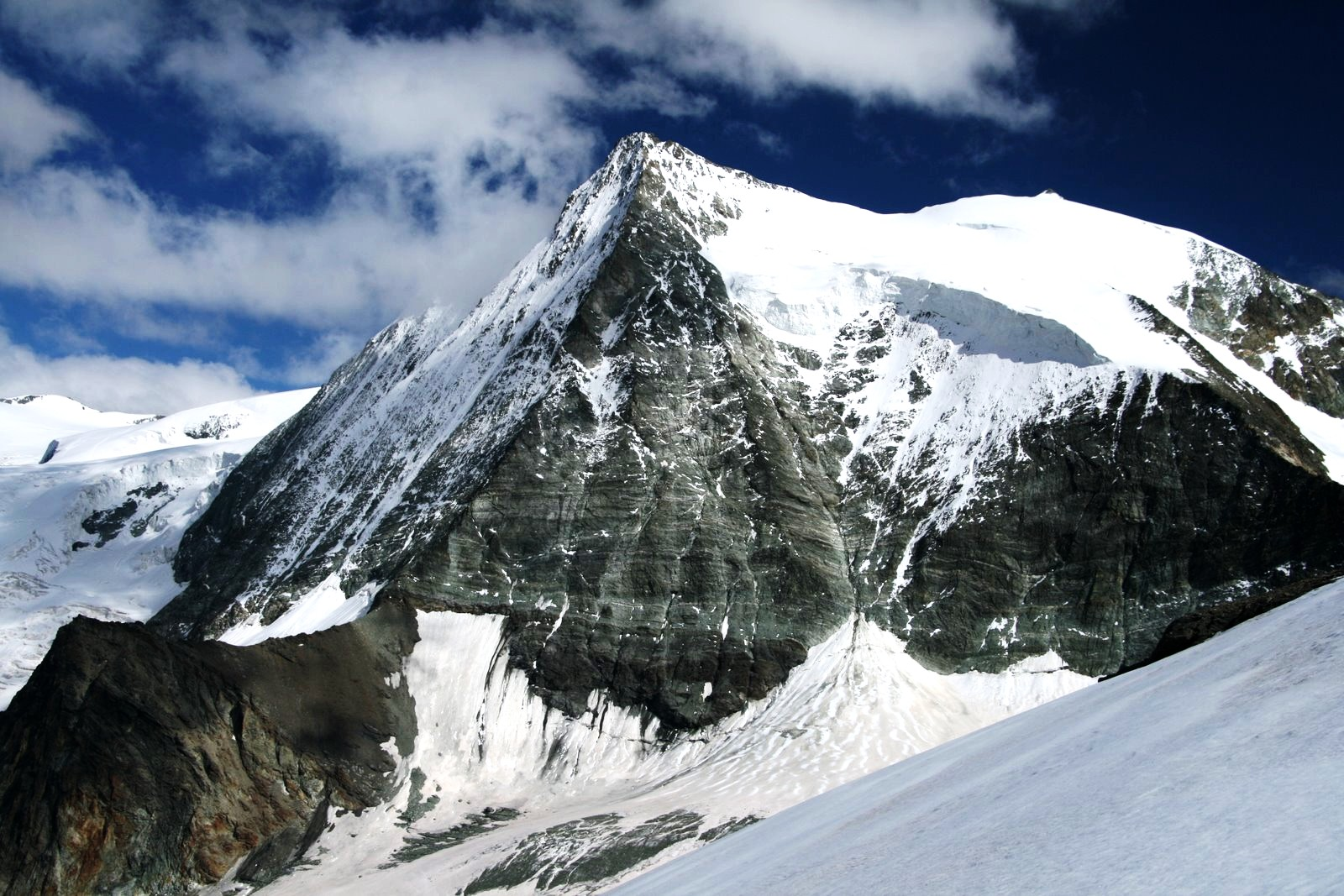
- North and west faces

Highest point
- Elevation: 3,870 m (12,697 ft)
- Prominence: 174 m (571 ft)
- Parent peak: La Ruinette
- Coordinates: 45°59′35.1″N 7°25′1.7″E

Geography
- Location within Switzerland
- Location: Valais, Switzerland
- Parent range: Pennine Alps

Climbing
- First ascent: 11 September 1865 by Johann Jakob Weilenmann and J. Felley
- Easiest route: West ridge

Mont Blanc de Cheilon (also spelled Mont Blanc de Seilon) is a mountain of the Pennine Alps, located in the Swiss canton of Valais. The mountain lies between the valleys of Bagnes and Arolla. Culminating at 3,870 metres above sea level, it is one of the highest summits between the Grand Combin to the west and the Dent Blanche to the east. The massif is glaciated, with the Cheilon Glacier to the north, the Giétro Glacier to the west, the Brenay Glacier to the south and the Tsijiore Nouve Glacier to the east.

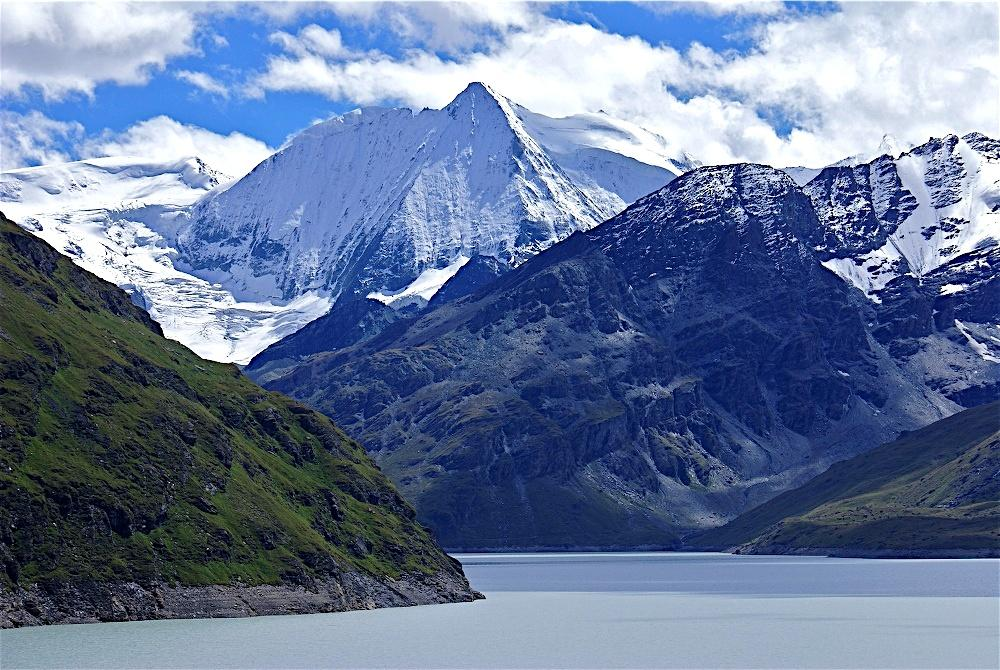
Mont Blanc de Cheilon seen from the Lac des Dix

The first ascent of the mountain was made by Johann Jakob Weilenmann and J. Felley on 11 September 1865.

== Huts ==
- Cabane des Dix (2,928 m)
- Cabane des Vignettes (3,158 m)
