= Eisten =

- Municipality
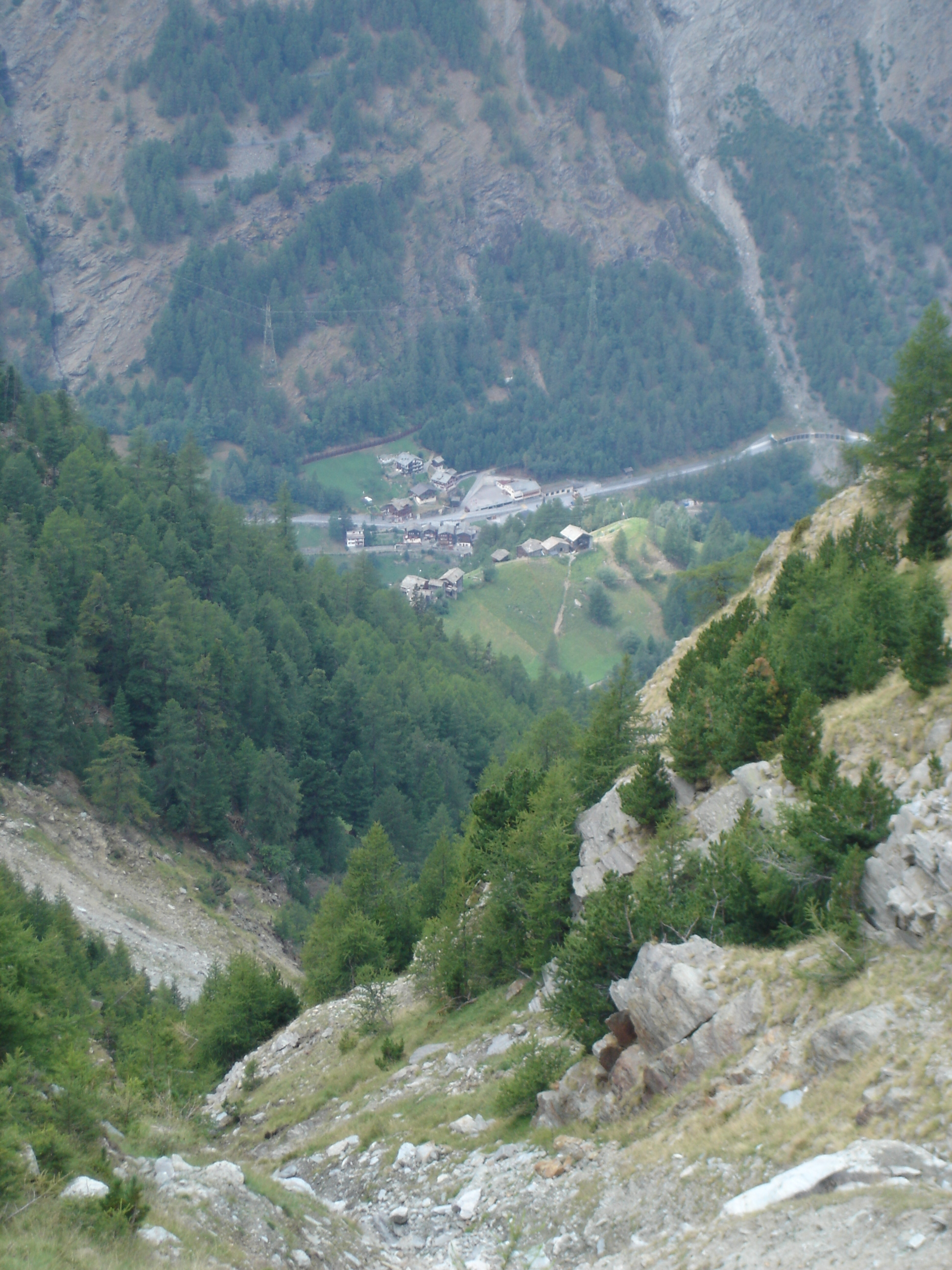
- Eisten village

- Flag Coat of arms
- Location of Eisten
- Location within Switzerland Location within Canton of Valais
- Coordinates: 46°12′N 7°54′E
- Country: Switzerland
- Canton: Valais
- District: Visp

Government
  - Mayor: Bruno Andenmatten

Area
  - Total: 38 km^{2} (15 sq mi)
- Elevation: 1,084 m (3,556 ft)

Population (December 2002)
  - Total: 258
  - Density: 6.8/km^{2} (18/sq mi)
- Time zone: UTC+01:00 (CET)
  - Summer (DST): UTC+02:00 (CEST)
- Postal code: 3922
- SFOS number: 6282
- ISO 3166 code: CH-VS
- Surrounded by: Grächen, Saas Balen, Sankt Niklaus, Simplon, Stalden, Staldenried, Visperterminen
- Website: www.eisten.ch

Eisten is a municipality in the district of Visp in the canton of Valais in Switzerland.

== History ==
Eisten is first mentioned in 1299 as Oysten.

== Geography ==
Eisten has an area, as of 2011, of 38 square kilometers (15 mi^{2}). Of this area, 9.6% is used for agricultural purposes, while 23.9% is forested. Of the rest of the land, 0.7% is settled (buildings or roads) and 65.8% is unproductive land.

The municipality is located in the Visp district, on the eastern and western sides of the entrance into the Saas valley. It lies east of the Mischabel range, which culminates at the Dom (4,545 m [14,911 ft]).

== Coat of arms ==
The blazon of the municipal coat of arms is Vert, a Lamb Argent passant over a Coupeaux Or, a chief Azure.

== Demographics ==
Eisten has a population (as of December 2020) of 188, all Swiss citizens. Over the last 10 years (2000–2010 ) the population has changed at a rate of -22%. It has changed at a rate of -5.7% due to migration and at a rate of -5.7% due to births and deaths.

Most of the population (as of 2000) speaks German (217 or 96.0%) as their first language, Albanian is the second most common (7 or 3.1%) and Romansh is the third (1 or 0.4%).

As of 2008, the population was 48.5% male and 51.5% female. The population was made up of 100 Swiss men and 106 Swiss women. Of the population in the municipality, 184 or about 81.4% were born in Eisten and lived there in 2000. There were 23 or 10.2% who were born in the same canton, while 6 or 2.7% were born somewhere else in Switzerland, and 12 or 5.3% were born outside of Switzerland.

As of 2000, children and teenagers (0–19 years old) make up 26.5% of the population, while adults (20–64 years old) make up 56.2% and seniors (over 64 years old) make up 17.3%.

As of 2000, there were 93 people who were single and never married in the municipality. There were 112 married individuals, 18 widows or widowers and 3 individuals who are divorced.

As of 2000, there were 80 private households in the municipality, and an average of 2.7 persons per household. There were 23 households that consist of only one person and 12 households with five or more people. In 2000, a total of 76 apartments (61.3% of the total) were permanently occupied, while 38 apartments (30.6%) were seasonally occupied and 10 apartments (8.1%) were empty.

The historical population is given in the following chart:

== Sights ==
The entire village of Eisten is designated as part of the Inventory of Swiss Heritage Sites.

== Politics ==
In the 2007 federal election the most popular party was the CVP which received 79.36% of the vote. The next three most popular parties were the SVP (8.45%), the FDP (5.82%) and the SP (5.26%). In the federal election, a total of 108 votes were cast, and the voter turnout was 58.1%.

In the 2009 Conseil d'État/Staatsrat election a total of 106 votes were cast, of which 4 or about 3.8% were invalid. The voter participation was 59.9%, which is much more than the cantonal average of 54.67%. In the 2007 Swiss Council of States election a total of 107 votes were cast, of which 1 or about 0.9% were invalid. The voter participation was 59.8%, which is similar to the cantonal average of 59.88%.

== Economy ==
As of 2010, Eisten had an unemployment rate of 1.8%. As of 2008, there were 14 people employed in the primary economic sector and about 8 businesses involved in this sector. 8 people were employed in the secondary sector and there were 3 businesses in this sector. 4 people were employed in the tertiary sector, with 3 businesses in this sector. There were 88 residents of the municipality who were employed in some capacity, of which females made up 30.7% of the workforce.

In 2008 the total number of full-time equivalent jobs was 15. The number of jobs in the primary sector was 4, all of which were in agriculture. The number of jobs in the secondary sector was 7 of which 6 or (85.7%) were in manufacturing The number of jobs in the tertiary sector was 4, of which 3 were in wholesale or retail sales or the repair of motor vehicles and 1 was in a hotel or restaurant.

In 2000, there were 3 workers who commuted into the municipality and 70 workers who commuted away. The municipality is a net exporter of workers, with about 23.3 workers leaving the municipality for every one entering. Of the working population, 28.4% used public transportation to get to work, and 62.5% used a private car.

== Religion ==
From the 2000 census, 208 or 92.0% were Roman Catholic, while 1 or 0.4% belonged to the Swiss Reformed Church. There were 9 (or about 3.98% of the population) who were Islamic. 3 (or about 1.33% of the population) belonged to no church, are agnostic or atheist, and 5 individuals (or about 2.21% of the population) did not answer the question.

== Education ==
In Eisten about 69 or (30.5%) of the population have completed non-mandatory upper secondary education, and 4 or (1.8%) have completed additional higher education (either university or a Fachhochschule). Of the 4 who completed tertiary schooling, 25.0% were Swiss men, 25.0% were Swiss women.

During the 2010-2011 school year there were a total of 15 students in the Eisten school system. The education system in the Canton of Valais allows young children to attend one year of non-obligatory Kindergarten. During that school year, there was one kindergarten class (KG1 or KG2) and 3 kindergarten students. The canton's school system requires students to attend six years of primary school. In Eisten there were a total of 2 classes and 15 students in the primary school. The secondary school program consists of three lower, obligatory years of schooling (orientation classes), followed by three to five years of optional, advanced schools. All the lower and upper secondary students from Eisten attend their school in a neighboring municipality.

As of 2000, there was one student in Eisten who came from another municipality, while 9 residents attended schools outside the municipality.
