= Staldenried =

- Municipality
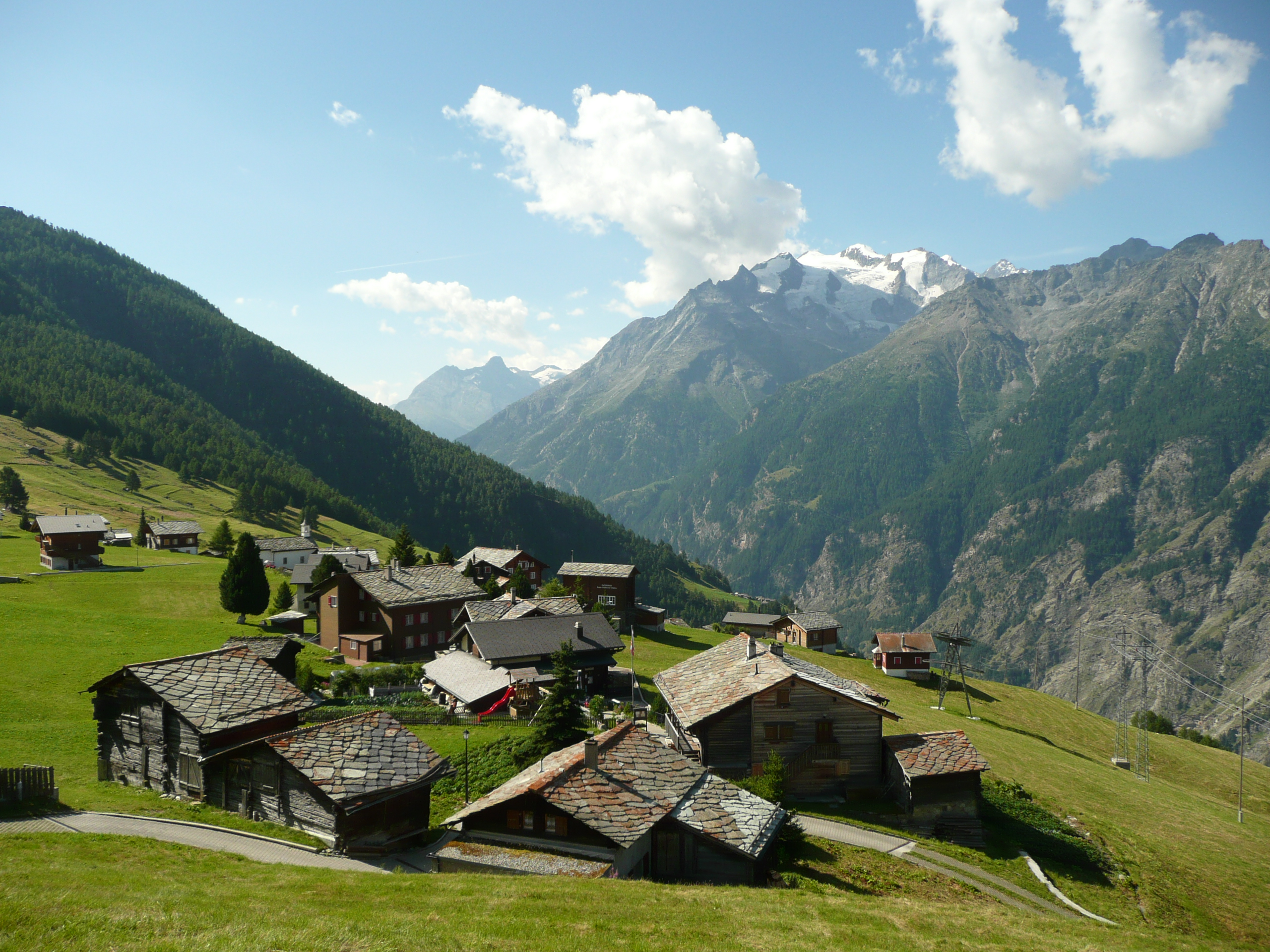
- Gspon village

- Flag Coat of arms
- Location of Staldenried
- Location within Switzerland Location within Canton of Valais
- Coordinates: 46°13′N 7°52′E
- Country: Switzerland
- Canton: Valais
- District: Visp

Government
  - Mayor: Alban Brigger

Area
  - Total: 14.30 km^{2} (5.52 sq mi)
- Elevation: 1,052 m (3,451 ft)

Population (December 2002)
  - Total: 595
  - Density: 41.6/km^{2} (108/sq mi)
- Time zone: UTC+01:00 (CET)
  - Summer (DST): UTC+02:00 (CEST)
- Postal code: 3933
- SFOS number: 6294
- ISO 3166 code: CH-VS
- Surrounded by: Eisten, Stalden, Visperterminen
- Website: staldenried.ch

Staldenried is a municipality in the district of Visp in the canton of Valais in Switzerland.

== History ==
Staldenried is first mentioned in 1389 as am ryede. In 1638 it was mentioned as Stalden Riedt.

== Geography ==
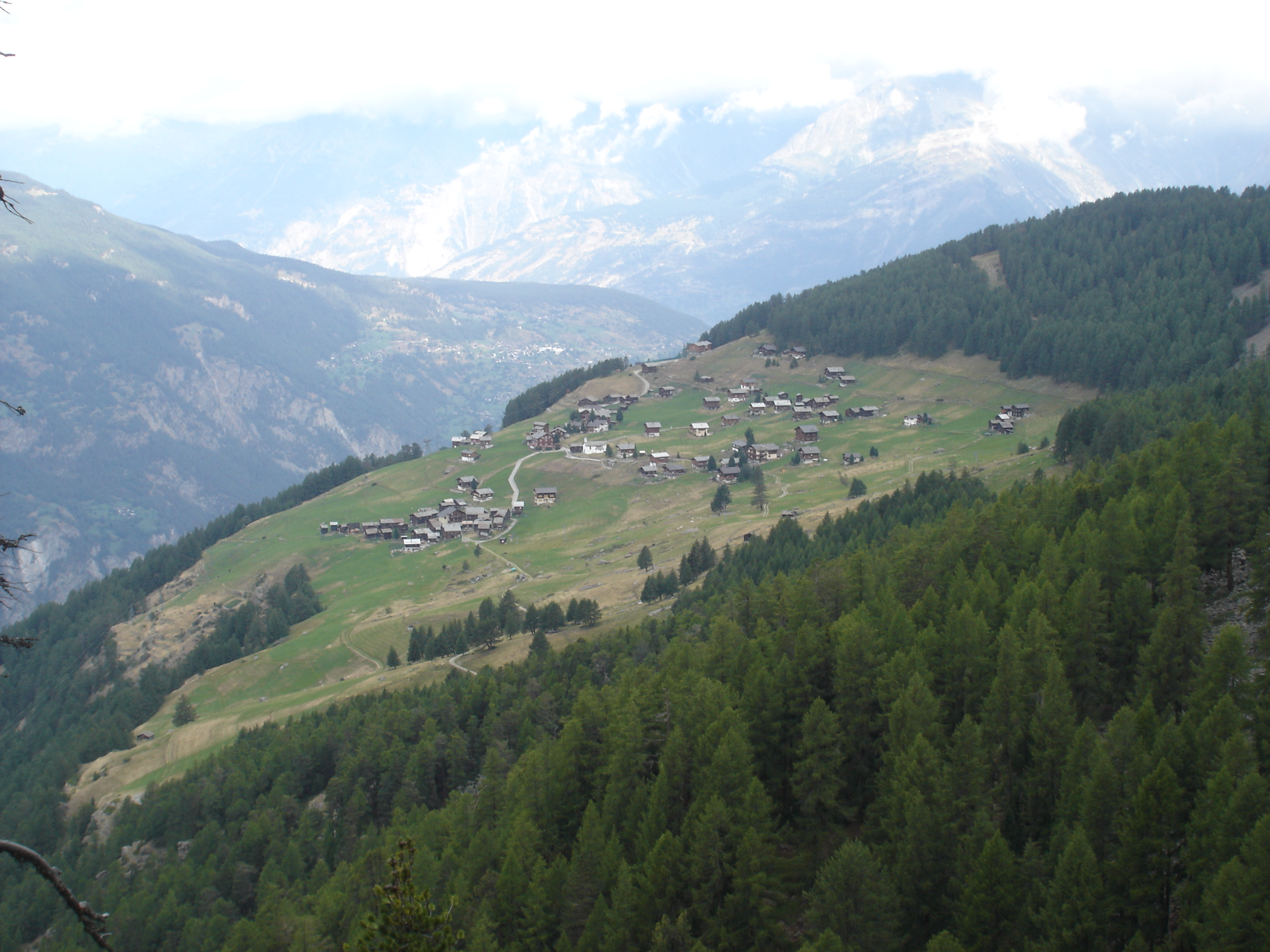
Gspon village

Staldenried has an area, as of 2011, of 14.3 square kilometers (5.5 mi^{2}). Of this area, 23.1% is used for agricultural purposes, while 42.9% is forested. Of the rest of the land, 2.2% is settled (buildings or roads) and 31.7% is unproductive land.

== Coat of arms ==
The blazon of the municipal coat of arms is Argent, a Pine tree Vert trunked and eradicated proper between two Trefoils of the second.

== Demographics ==
Staldenried has a population (as of December 2020) of 537. As of 2008, 1.9% of the population are resident foreign nationals. Over the last 10 years (2000–2010 ) the population has changed at a rate of 2%. It has changed at a rate of 3.9% due to migration and at a rate of 1.8% due to births and deaths.

Most of the population (as of 2000) speaks German (549 or 99.1%) as their first language, French is the second most common (1 or 0.2%) and Romansh is the third (1 or 0.2%). There is 1 person who speaks Italian.

As of 2008, the population was 52.7% male and 47.3% female. The population was made up of 284 Swiss men (46.8% of the population) and 36 (5.9%) non-Swiss men. There were 284 Swiss women (46.8%) and 3 (0.5%) non-Swiss women. Of the population in the municipality, 436 or about 78.7% were born in Staldenried and lived there in 2000. There were 85 or 15.3% who were born in the same canton, while 19 or 3.4% were born somewhere else in Switzerland, and 6 or 1.1% were born outside of Switzerland.

As of 2000, children and teenagers (0–19 years old) make up 27.6% of the population, while adults (20–64 years old) make up 60.1% and seniors (over 64 years old) make up 12.3%.

As of 2000, there were 232 people who were single and never married in the municipality. There were 276 married individuals, 38 widows or widowers and 8 individuals who are divorced.

As of 2000, there were 202 private households in the municipality, and an average of 2.7 persons per household. There were 48 households that consist of only one person and 29 households with five or more people. In 2000, a total of 198 apartments (50.8% of the total) were permanently occupied, while 161 apartments (41.3%) were seasonally occupied and 31 apartments (7.9%) were empty. As of 2009, the construction rate of new housing units was 3.3 new units per 1000 residents. The vacancy rate for the municipality, in 2010, was 1.47%.

The historical population is given in the following chart:

== Politics ==
In the 2007 federal election the most popular party was the CVP which received 77.86% of the vote. The next three most popular parties were the SP (11.39%), the SVP (8.62%) and the FDP (1.3%). In the federal election, a total of 317 votes were cast, and the voter turnout was 71.4%.

In the 2009 Conseil d'État/Staatsrat election a total of 340 votes were cast, of which 10 or about 2.9% were invalid. The voter participation was 76.9%, which is much more than the cantonal average of 54.67%. In the 2007 Swiss Council of States election a total of 317 votes were cast, of which 2 or about 0.6% were invalid. The voter participation was 72.1%, which is much more than the cantonal average of 59.88%.

== Economy ==
As of 2010, Staldenried had an unemployment rate of 1.2%. As of 2008, there were 42 people employed in the primary economic sector and about 22 businesses involved in this sector. 4 people were employed in the secondary sector and there were 3 businesses in this sector. 41 people were employed in the tertiary sector, with 12 businesses in this sector.

In 2008 the total number of full-time equivalent jobs was 47. The number of jobs in the primary sector was 14, all of which were in agriculture. The number of jobs in the secondary sector was 4 of which 3 or (75.0%) were in manufacturing and 1 was in construction. The number of jobs in the tertiary sector was 29. In the tertiary sector; 2 or 6.9% were in wholesale or retail sales or the repair of motor vehicles, 7 or 24.1% were in the movement and storage of goods, 9 or 31.0% were in a hotel or restaurant, 2 or 6.9% were technical professionals or scientists, 5 or 17.2% were in education.

In 2000, there were 2 workers who commuted into the municipality and 203 workers who commuted away. The municipality is a net exporter of workers, with about 101.5 workers leaving the municipality for every one entering. Of the working population, 39.2% used public transportation to get to work, and 45.4% used a private car.

== Religion ==
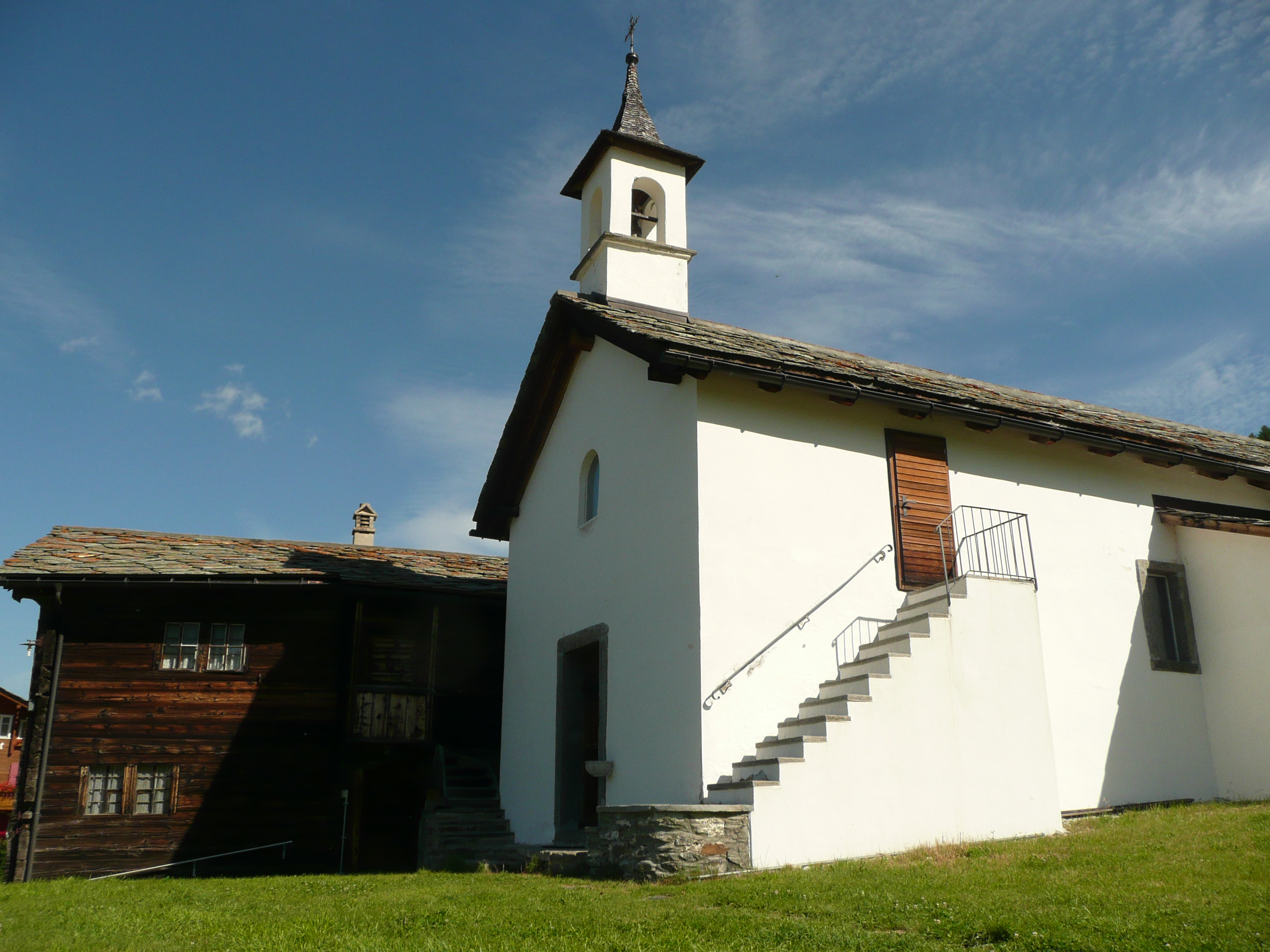
Gspon chapel

From the 2000 census, 536 or 96.8% were Roman Catholic, while 5 or 0.9% belonged to the Swiss Reformed Church. Of the rest of the population, there was 1 individual who belongs to another Christian church. There was 1 individual who was Islamic. There was 1 person who was Buddhist. 5 (or about 0.90% of the population) belonged to no church, are agnostic or atheist, and 5 individuals (or about 0.90% of the population) did not answer the question.

== Education ==
In Staldenried about 213 or (38.4%) of the population have completed non-mandatory upper secondary education, and 29 or (5.2%) have completed additional higher education (either university or a Fachhochschule). Of the 29 who completed tertiary schooling, 82.8% were Swiss men, 10.3% were Swiss women.

During the 2010–2011 school year there were a total of 54 students in the Staldenried school system. The education system in the Canton of Valais allows young children to attend one year of non-obligatory Kindergarten. During that school year, there was one kindergarten class (KG1 or KG2) and 12 kindergarten students. The canton's school system requires students to attend six years of primary school. In Staldenried there were a total of 4 classes and 54 students in the primary school. The secondary school program consists of three lower, obligatory years of schooling (orientation classes), followed by three to five years of optional, advanced schools. All the lower and upper secondary students from Staldenried attend their school in a neighboring municipality.

As of 2000, there were 3 students in Staldenried who came from another municipality, while 26 residents attended schools outside the municipality.
