= Törbel =

- Municipality
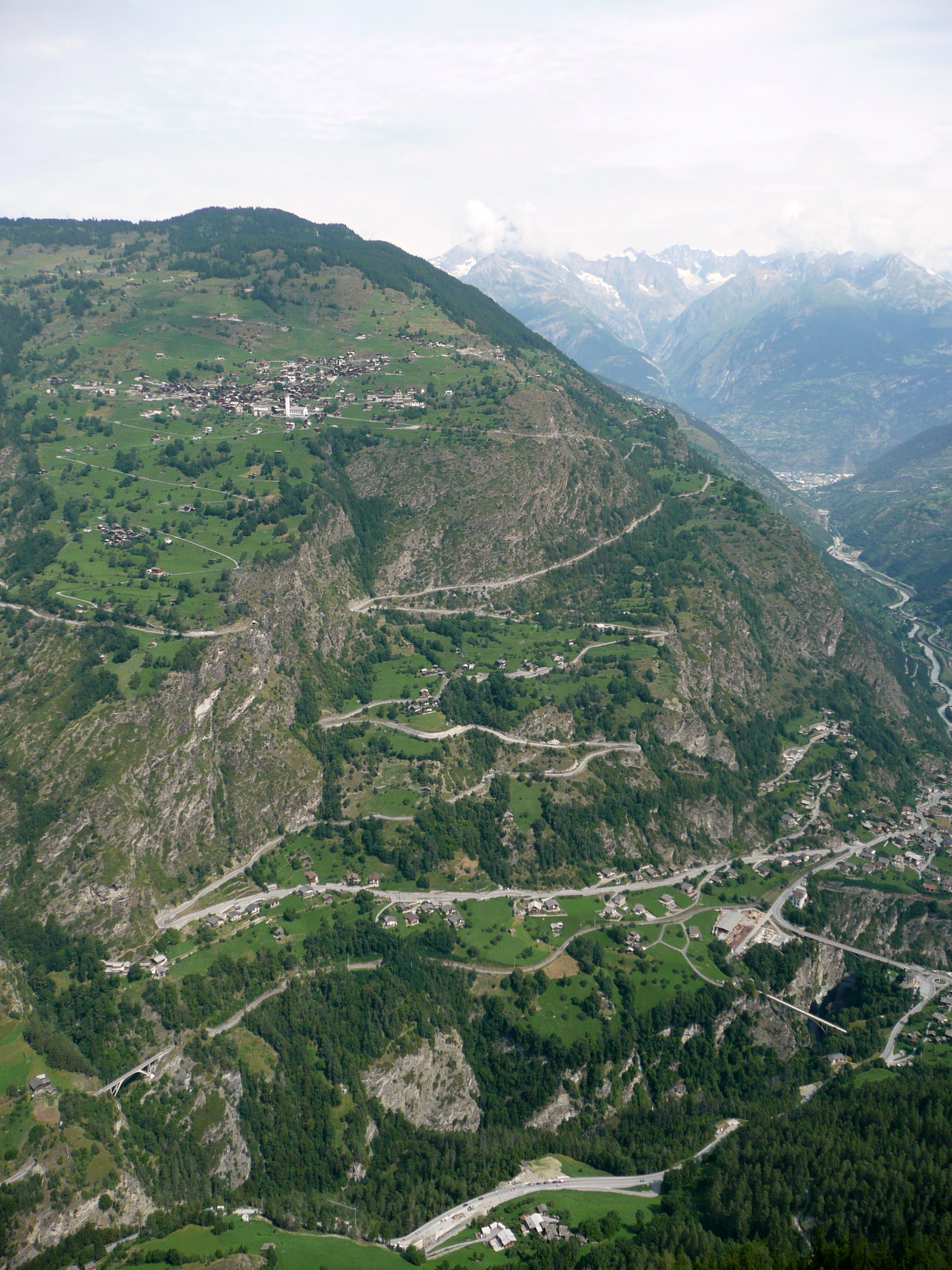
- Törbel as seen from Grächen

- Flag Coat of arms
- Location of Törbel
- Location within Switzerland Location within Canton of Valais
- Coordinates: 46°15′N 7°50′E
- Country: Switzerland
- Canton: Valais
- District: Visp

Government
  - Mayor: Alex Petrig (from 1.1.2013 on Urs Juon)

Area
  - Total: 17.61 km^{2} (6.80 sq mi)
- Elevation: 1,502 m (4,928 ft)

Population (December 2002)
  - Total: 520
  - Density: 30/km^{2} (76/sq mi)
- Time zone: UTC+01:00 (CET)
  - Summer (DST): UTC+02:00 (CEST)
- Postal code: 3923
- SFOS number: 6296
- ISO 3166 code: CH-VS
- Surrounded by: Bürchen, Embd, Grächen, Stalden, Unterbäch, Zeneggen
- Website: toerbel.ch

Törbel is a municipality in the district of Visp in the canton of Valais in Switzerland. The highest point is the peak of the Augstbordhorns at 2,972 meters (9,751 ft).

== History ==
Törbel is first mentioned in 1034 as Dorbia.

== Geography ==
Törbel has an area, as of 2011, of 17.6 square kilometers (6.8 mi^{2}). Of this area, 33.6% is used for agricultural purposes, while 37.6% is forested. Of the rest of the land, 2.8% is settled (buildings or roads) and 26.0% is unproductive land.

The municipality is located in the Visp district, in the Visp valley above Stalden. It consists of the village of Törbel and the hamlets of Burge, Feld and Brunnen as well as six additional settlements.

== Coat of arms ==
The blazon of the municipal coat of arms is A chief Argent, per fess Azure on a Mount Vert a Tower Argent and Or a Fountain Sable, overall capital letter tau.

== Demographics ==
Törbel has a population (as of December 2020) of 498. As of 2008, 1.8% of the population are resident foreign nationals. Over the last 10 years (2000–2010 ) the population has changed at a rate of -10.3%. It has changed at a rate of -4% due to migration and at a rate of -2.2% due to births and deaths.

Most of the population (as of 2000) speaks German (494 or 99.2%) as their first language with the rest speaking Serbo-Croatian.

As of 2008, the population was 50.5% male and 49.5% female. The population was made up of 244 Swiss men (49.9% of the population) and 3 (0.6%) non-Swiss men. There were 240 Swiss women (49.1%) and 2 (0.4%) non-Swiss women. Of the population in the municipality, 414 or about 83.1% were born in Törbel and lived there in 2000. There were 45 or 9.0% who were born in the same canton, while 23 or 4.6% were born somewhere else in Switzerland, and 8 or 1.6% were born outside of Switzerland.

As of 2000, children and teenagers (0–19 years old) make up 27.5% of the population, while adults (20–64 years old) make up 54% and seniors (over 64 years old) make up 18.5%.

As of 2000, there were 215 people who were single and never married in the municipality. There were 238 married individuals, 37 widows or widowers and 8 individuals who are divorced.

As of 2000, there were 182 private households in the municipality, and an average of 2.7 persons per household. There were 48 households that consist of only one person and 26 households with five or more people. In 2000, a total of 172 apartments (47.8% of the total) were permanently occupied, while 163 apartments (45.3%) were seasonally occupied and 25 apartments (6.9%) were empty. As of 2009, the construction rate of new housing units was 4.1 new units per 1000 residents. The vacancy rate for the municipality, in 2010, was 3.92%.

The historical population is given in the following chart:

== Heritage sites of national significance ==
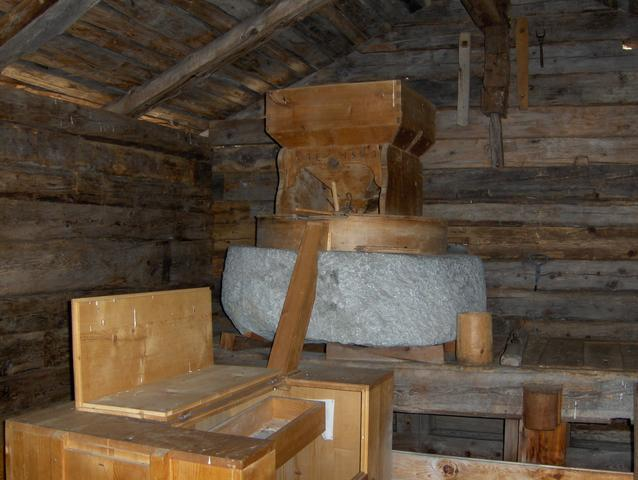
Mill

The Mill in Törbel is listed as a Swiss heritage site of national significance. The entire village of Törbel, and the hamlets of Burge and Feld are all part of the Inventory of Swiss Heritage Sites.

== Twin Town ==
Törbel is twinned with the town of Triesen, Liechtenstein.

== Politics ==
In the 2007 federal election the most popular party was the CVP which received 83.59% of the vote. The next three most popular parties were the SVP (11.9%), the Green Party (1.59%) and the SP (1.53%). In the federal election, a total of 244 votes were cast, and the voter turnout was 59.1%.

In the 2009 Conseil d'État/Staatsrat election a total of 281 votes were cast, of which 8 or about 2.8% were invalid. The voter participation was 70.6%, which is much more than the cantonal average of 54.67%. In the 2007 Swiss Council of States election a total of 241 votes were cast, of which 5 or about 2.1% were invalid. The voter participation was 60.3%, which is similar to the cantonal average of 59.88%.

== Economy ==
As of 2010, Törbel had an unemployment rate of 0.8%. As of 2008, there were 93 people employed in the primary economic sector and about 42 businesses involved in this sector. 14 people were employed in the secondary sector and there were 2 businesses in this sector. 53 people were employed in the tertiary sector, with 9 businesses in this sector. There were 216 residents of the municipality who were employed in some capacity, of which females made up 37.5% of the workforce.

In 2008 the total number of full-time equivalent jobs was 83. The number of jobs in the primary sector was 34, all of which were in agriculture. The number of jobs in the secondary sector was 10, all of which were in manufacturing. The number of jobs in the tertiary sector was 39. In the tertiary sector; 2 or 5.1% were in wholesale or retail sales or the repair of motor vehicles, 2 or 5.1% were in the movement and storage of goods, 21 or 53.8% were in a hotel or restaurant, 3 or 7.7% were in education.

In 2000, there were 9 workers who commuted into the municipality and 149 workers who commuted away. The municipality is a net exporter of workers, with about 16.6 workers leaving the municipality for every one entering. Of the working population, 34.3% used public transportation to get to work, and 44% used a private car.

== Ethnography ==
In 1981 the American anthropologist Robert McC. Netting published an ethnography of Törbel entitled Balancing on the Alp that studied the ecological balance between the inhabitants of the town and their environment. He undertook the study to further document the relationship of intensification of agriculture to population developed in his earlier work on the Kofyar people of Nigeria in an area that had well documented demographic data. Netting wrote in his introduction that he was led to Törbel by a description of "several villages in Vispertal, the largest of which was Törbel," in a monograph by the Swiss ethnographer and agriculturalist Friedrich Gottlieb Stebler.

== Religion ==
From the 2000 census, 473 or 95.0% were Roman Catholic, while 5 or 1.0% belonged to the Swiss Reformed Church. Of the rest of the population, there was 1 individual who belongs to another Christian church. There were 2 individuals who belonged to another church. 10 (or about 2.01% of the population) belonged to no church, are agnostic or atheist, and 7 individuals (or about 1.41% of the population) did not answer the question. Since 2008 Kailash International Retreat Centre, a buddhist Retreat Centre of the New Kadampa Tradition is located in Törbel.

== Education ==
In Törbel about 137 or (27.5%) of the population have completed non-mandatory upper secondary education, and 9 or (1.8%) have completed additional higher education (either university or a Fachhochschule). Of the 9 who completed tertiary schooling, 77.8% were Swiss men, 22.2% were Swiss women.

During the 2010–2011 school year there were a total of 38 students in the Törbel school system. The education system in the Canton of Valais allows young children to attend one year of non-obligatory Kindergarten. During that school year, there was one kindergarten class (KG1 or KG2) and 10 kindergarten students. The canton's school system requires students to attend six years of primary school. In Törbel there were a total of 3 classes and 38 students in the primary school. The secondary school program consists of three lower, obligatory years of schooling (orientation classes), followed by three to five years of optional, advanced schools. All the lower and upper secondary students from Törbel attend their school in a neighboring municipality.

As of 2000, there were 35 students from Törbel who attended schools outside the municipality.
