= Visp District =

Coordinates: 46°17′N 7°52′E

Visp Bezirk Visp
- District
- Flag Coat of arms
- Country: Switzerland
- Canton: Valais
- Capital: Visp

Area
  - Total: 863.8 km^{2} (333.5 sq mi)

Population (2020)
  - Total: 28,547
  - Density: 33.05/km^{2} (85.59/sq mi)
- Time zone: UTC+1 (CET)
  - Summer (DST): UTC+2 (CEST)
- Municipalities: 19

The district of Visp (German: Bezirk Visp, French: District de Viège) is a district in the Canton of Valais in southern Switzerland. It has a population of 28,547 (as of 31 December 2020).

== Municipalities ==
It consists of the following municipalities:

Municipality	Population (31 December 2020)	Area km^{2}
Baltschieder	1,305	31.44
Eisten	188	38.05
Embd	280	13.39
Grächen	1,258	14.32
Lalden	668	1.28
Randa	425	54.51
Saas-Almagell	364	110.22
Saas-Balen	351	30.18
Saas-Fee	1,559	40.6
Saas-Grund	990	24.55
St. Niklaus	2,224	89.23
Stalden	1,052	10.43
Staldenried	537	14.32
Täsch	1,345	58.72
Törbel	498	17.59
Visp	8,060	13.17
Visperterminen	1,328	51.62
Zeneggen	295	7.49
Zermatt	5,820	242.69
Total	28,547	863.8

== Coat of arms ==
The blazon of the district coat of arms is Per pale Argent and Gules, two Lions rampant respectant counterchanged.

== Demographics ==
Visp has a population (as of December 2020) of 28,547. Most of the population (as of 2000) speaks German (23,373 or 87.2%) as their first language, Portuguese is the second most common (853 or 3.2%) and Italian is the third (658 or 2.5%). There are 398 people who speak French and 12 people who speak Romansh.

As of 2008, the gender distribution of the population was 49.8% male and 50.2% female. The population was made up of 10,909 Swiss men (39.4% of the population) and 2,881 (10.4%) non-Swiss men. There were 11,353 Swiss women (41.0%) and 2,528 (9.1%) non-Swiss women. Of the population in the district 14,307 or about 53.3% were born in Visp and lived there in 2000. There were 5,434 or 20.3% who were born in the same canton, while 2,212 or 8.2% were born somewhere else in Switzerland, and 4,191 or 15.6% were born outside of Switzerland.

As of 2000, there were 11,574 people who were single and never married in the district. There were 13,177 married individuals, 1,370 widows or widowers and 698 individuals who are divorced.

There were 2,999 households that consist of only one person and 834 households with five or more people. Out of a total of 10,682 households that answered this question, 28.1% were households made up of just one person and there were 135 adults who lived with their parents. Of the rest of the households, there are 2,616 married couples without children, 3,826 married couples with children There were 478 single parents with a child or children. There were 193 households that were made up of unrelated people and 435 households that were made up of some sort of institution or another collective housing.

The historical population is given in the following chart:

== Mergers and name changes ==
On 1 October 1972, Eyholz merged into the municipality of Visp. On 1 January 2007 the municipality of Saas Almagell changed its name to Saas-Almagell, the municipality of Saas Balen changed its name to Saas-Balen and the municipality of Saas Fee changed its name to Saas-Fee.

== Politics ==
In the 2007 federal election the most popular party was the CVP which received 67.33% of the vote. The next three most popular parties were the SVP (14.7%), the SP (10.67%) and the FDP (5.51%). In the federal election, a total of 10,367 votes were cast, and the voter turnout was 56.8%.

In the 2009 Conseil d'État/Staatsrat election a total of 10,034 votes were cast, of which 702 or about 7.0% were invalid. The voter participation was 55.2%, which is similar to the cantonal average of 54.67%. In the 2007 Swiss Council of States election a total of 10,281 votes were cast, of which 350 or about 3.4% were invalid. The voter participation was 56.9%, which is similar to the cantonal average of 59.88%.

== Religion ==
From the 2000 census, 22,775 or 84.9% were Roman Catholic, while 1,156 or 4.3% belonged to the Swiss Reformed Church. Of the rest of the population, there were 495 members of an Orthodox church (or about 1.85% of the population), there were 7 individuals (or about 0.03% of the population) who belonged to the Christian Catholic Church, and there were 297 individuals (or about 1.11% of the population) who belonged to another Christian church. There were 6 individuals (or about 0.02% of the population) who were Jewish, and 613 (or about 2.29% of the population) who were Islamic. There were 24 individuals who were Buddhist, 3 individuals who were Hindu and 9 individuals who belonged to another church. 433 (or about 1.61% of the population) belonged to no church, are agnostic or atheist, and 1,136 individuals (or about 4.24% of the population) did not answer the question.

== Weather ==
Visp town has an average of 78.9 days of rain or snow per year and on average receives 599 mm (23.6 in) of precipitation. The wettest month is November during which time Visp receives an average of 70 mm (2.8 in) of rain or snow. During this month there is precipitation for an average of 7.2 days. The month with the most days of precipitation is August, with an average of 7.6, but with only 42 mm (1.7 in) of rain or snow. The driest month of the year is September with an average of 32 mm (1.3 in) of precipitation over 5.3 days.

== Education ==
In Visp about 9,778 or (36.5%) of the population have completed non-mandatory upper secondary education, and 1,962 or (7.3%) have completed additional higher education (either University or a Fachhochschule). Of the 1,962 who completed tertiary schooling, 65.1% were Swiss men, 18.1% were Swiss women, 9.8% were non-Swiss men and 6.9% were non-Swiss women.
