= St. Niklaus, Switzerland =

St. Niklaus
- Municipality
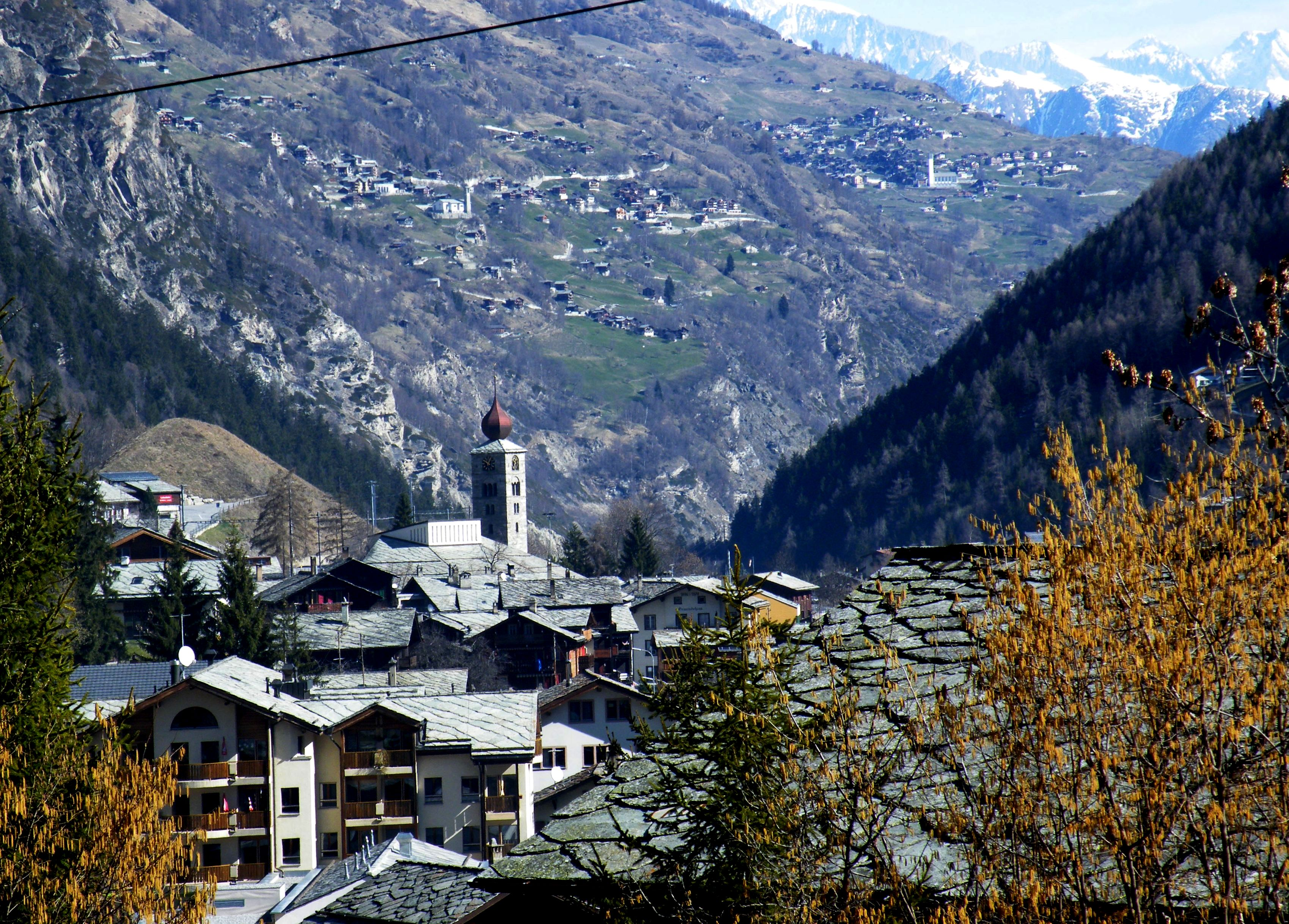
- St Niklaus as seen from the north side

- Flag Coat of arms
- Location of St. Niklaus
- Location within Switzerland Location within Canton of Valais
- Coordinates: 46°11′N 7°48′E
- Country: Switzerland
- Canton: Valais
- District: Visp

Government
  - Mayor: Gabriela Fux-Brantschen

Area
  - Total: 89.37 km^{2} (34.51 sq mi)
- Elevation: 1,120 m (3,670 ft)

Population (December 2002)
  - Total: 2,379
  - Density: 26.62/km^{2} (68.94/sq mi)
- Time zone: UTC+01:00 (CET)
  - Summer (DST): UTC+02:00 (CEST)
- Postal code: 3924
- SFOS number: 6292
- ISO 3166 code: CH-VS
- Surrounded by: Stalden, Embd, Grächen, Visp Randa, Saas Balen, Saas Fee
- Website: gemeinde.st-niklaus.ch

St. Niklaus (French: Saint-Nicolas) is a village and a municipality in the Mattertal, part of the district of Visp in the canton of Valais in Switzerland.

== History ==
St. Niklaus is first mentioned in 1233 as chousun. In 1272 it was mentioned as ecclesia Sancti Nicholai de Chouson, Gebreitun de Gazun, 1388 in villa sti nicolai de chosun, niu a fr Saint-Nicolas.

== Mountain guide dynasty ==
St. Niklaus is home to a famous mountain guide dynasty. It was founded in the mid-19th century by:

- Josef Marie Lochmatter (1833–1882)
- Peter Knubel (1832–1919; his best friend)
- Alois Pollinger (1844–1910; his brother-in-law)
- Josef Imboden (1840–1925; Knubel's cousin)

Lochmatter and Knubel were the first well-informed guides of the Matterhorn and were consequently pioneers in the development of modern tourism in the valley of St. Niklaus and particularly in Zermatt. They also had a monopoly on Matterhorn ascents. Moreover, as the first Swiss guide to do so, Knubel climbed a mountain outside the Alps in 1874, the highest European summit, Elbrus in the Caucasus. Pollinger invented the double-rope system of descent, which he used successfully at the Ridge of Ferpècle. Imboden was the first Swiss to ascend an (unnamed) 6,000 meter-high mountain in the Himalayas in 1883, where the highest mountains in the world are located.

The fathers trained the sons very early in their expeditions. The initiators of the new school came out of their ranks for the second time, a fact that gave a new input to alpinism and the level of which was not reached again until the 1930s. They were not satisfied to simply climb a high mountain; they always chose more and more difficult routes. The three rope teams of St. Niklaus have made the totality of the possible expeditions in this area of the Alps:

- Josef Lochmatter (1872–1914) with Valentine J.E. Ryan
- Josef Pollinger (1873–1943) with Robert W. Lloyd
- Josef Knubel (1881–1961) with Geoffrey W. Young

They were the also first ski-guides and were also pioneers overseas.

The mountain guides of St. Niklaus have effected about 300 first ascents a little bit everywhere in the world. Routes and mountains in Switzerland, France, Norway and Canada bear their names, for example

- the Ridge of the Four Asses in Switzerland (Dent Blanche, first ascent by Alois Pollinger in 1882)
- the Chimney Lochmatter in France (Aiguille du Grépon, first ascent by Josef Lochmatter in 1913),
- the Chimney Knubel in France (Aiguille du Grépon, first ascent by Josef Knubel in 1911),
- the Imbodentind in Norway (first ascent by Josef Imboden in 1899),
- Mount Pollinger and Mount Sarbach in Canada.

In 1995 a monument for all guides of St. Niklaus was built. Moreover, in 2000 a museum of the mountain guides was opened in St. Niklaus.

== Geography ==
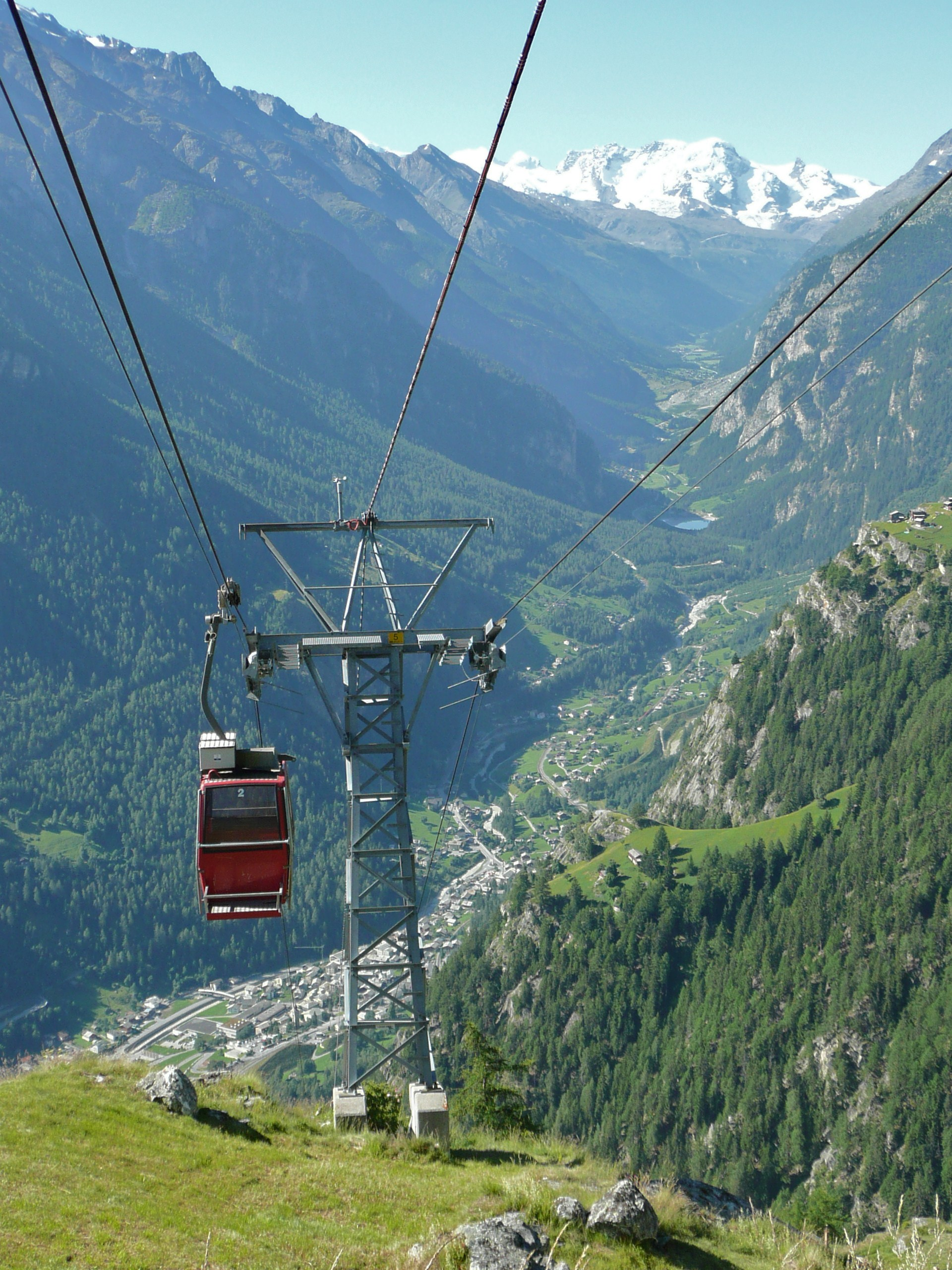
Cable car from Jungen to St. Niklaus

St. Niklaus has an area, as of 2011, of 89.3 square kilometers (34.5 mi^{2}). Of this area, 9.8% is used for agricultural purposes, while 21.5% is forested. Of the rest of the land, 1.5% is settled (buildings or roads) and 67.2% is unproductive land.

The municipality is located in the Visp district. It is the main settlement in the Matter valley (also called the Nikolai valley). It consists of the settlements of Riedmatten, Dorf, Stalu, Ze Schwidernu, Mattsand, Herbriggen, Breitmatten on the valley floor and the alpine settlement of Gasenried on the eastern slope.

St Niklaus sits in the Mattertal, the steep valley that runs from Stalden to Zermatt, and is surrounded by some of the highest summits in the Alps, such as Dom and Weisshorn. There are several footpath nets for Alpine hikers leading up on the mountains and on the mountain huts. The closest hut is the Topali hut at the west side of the village. The Bordier hut at the east side can be accessed easily from St Niklaus. The highest mountain close to St Niklaus is Brunegghorn, reaching almost 4,000 m (13,000 ft).

In 1866 the municipality was created through the merger of St. Niklaus Dorf and St. Niklaus Matt.

== Transport ==
The municipality is a stop on section of the Matterhorn Gotthard Bahn between Visp railway station and Zermatt railway station. Two trains an hour serve the station in each direction, reducing to hourly in the evening.

Also near the station is the Jungenbahn cable car which links St Niklaus with the alpine settlement of Jungen and its alpine trails.

== Coat of arms ==
The blazon of the municipal coat of arms is Per fess, Azure four Mullets of Five Or three and one, and Or on Coupeaux Vert a Trefoil slipped of the same.

== Demographics ==
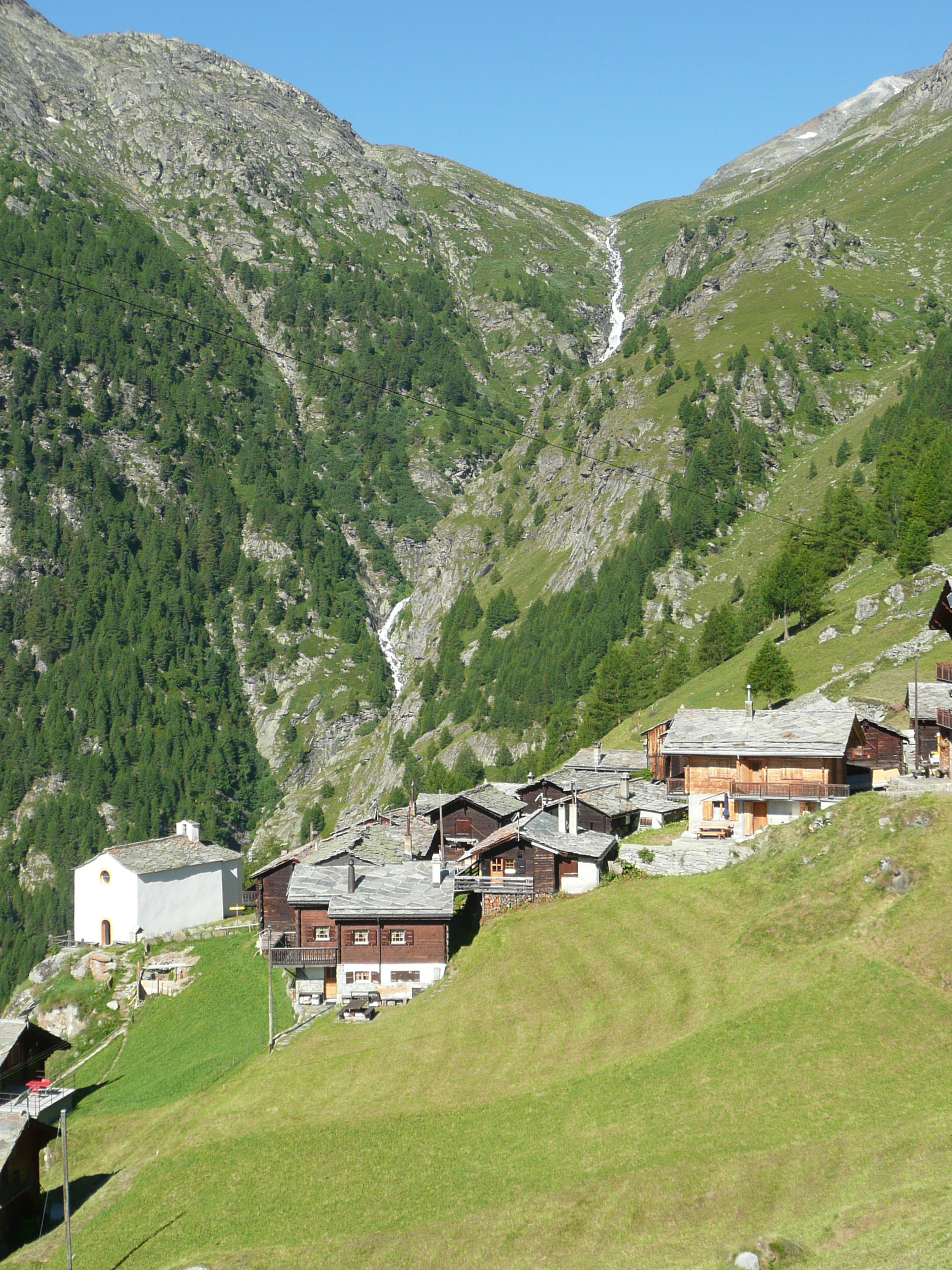
Jungen village

St. Niklaus has a population (as of December 2020) of 2,224. As of 2008, 5.9% of the population are resident foreign nationals. Over the last 10 years (2000–2010 ) the population has changed at a rate of -6.7%. It has changed at a rate of -4.2% due to migration and at a rate of -0.3% due to births and deaths.

Most of the population (as of 2000) speaks German (2,234 or 97.0%) as their first language, Serbo-Croatian is the second most common (18 or 0.8%) and Italian is the third (17 or 0.7%). There are 10 people who speak French and 1 person who speaks Romansh.

As of 2008, the population was 49.6% male and 50.4% female. The population was made up of 1,048 Swiss men (45.9% of the population) and 84 (3.7%) non-Swiss men. There were 1,070 Swiss women (46.9%) and 81 (3.5%) non-Swiss women. Of the population in the municipality, 1,729 or about 75.0% were born in St. Niklaus and lived there in 2000. There were 336 or 14.6% who were born in the same canton, while 103 or 4.5% were born somewhere else in Switzerland, and 125 or 5.4% were born outside of Switzerland.

As of 2000, children and teenagers (0–19 years old) make up 26% of the population, while adults (20–64 years old) make up 58.6% and seniors (over 64 years old) make up 15.4%.

As of 2000, there were 967 people who were single and never married in the municipality. There were 1,150 married individuals, 143 widows or widowers and 44 individuals who are divorced.

As of 2000, there were 823 private households in the municipality, and an average of 2.7 persons per household. There were 203 households that consist of only one person and 100 households with five or more people. In 2000, a total of 762 apartments (76.1% of the total) were permanently occupied, while 151 apartments (15.1%) were seasonally occupied and 88 apartments (8.8%) were empty. As of 2009, the construction rate of new housing units was 0.4 new units per 1000 residents. The vacancy rate for the municipality, in 2010, was 3.16%.

The historical population is given in the following chart:

== Sights ==
St. Niklaus is an important central village in the valley. It has a strong history of bergfuehrers, or mountain guides. The guides would board the train to Zermatt and find clients on the journey, mostly Englishmen. There is a Bergfuehrer museum in St. Niklaus telling this history. The museum is located at the Meier Turm (Tower) house and has a history of 150 years of mountaineering tradition. A greater collection of local minerals are also at display from a private collection. The museum is open from July until September.

St. Niklaus is closely connected to the village of Grächen, a popular family holiday ski resort in the mountains above. Sankt Niklaus is also a popular place to stay when visiting both Zermatt and Saas Fee, as it lies between both.

== Politics ==
In the 2007 federal election the most popular party was the CVP which received 69.66% of the vote. The next three most popular parties were the SVP (20.86%), the SP (7.39%) and the FDP (0.86%). In the federal election, a total of 831 votes were cast, and the voter turnout was 47.1%.

In the 2009 Conseil d'État/Staatsrat election a total of 829 votes were cast, of which 53 or about 6.4% were invalid. The voter participation was 47.9%, which is much less than the cantonal average of 54.67%. In the 2007 Swiss Council of States election a total of 825 votes were cast, of which 20 or about 2.4% were invalid. The voter participation was 47.3%, which is much less than the cantonal average of 59.88%.

== Economy ==
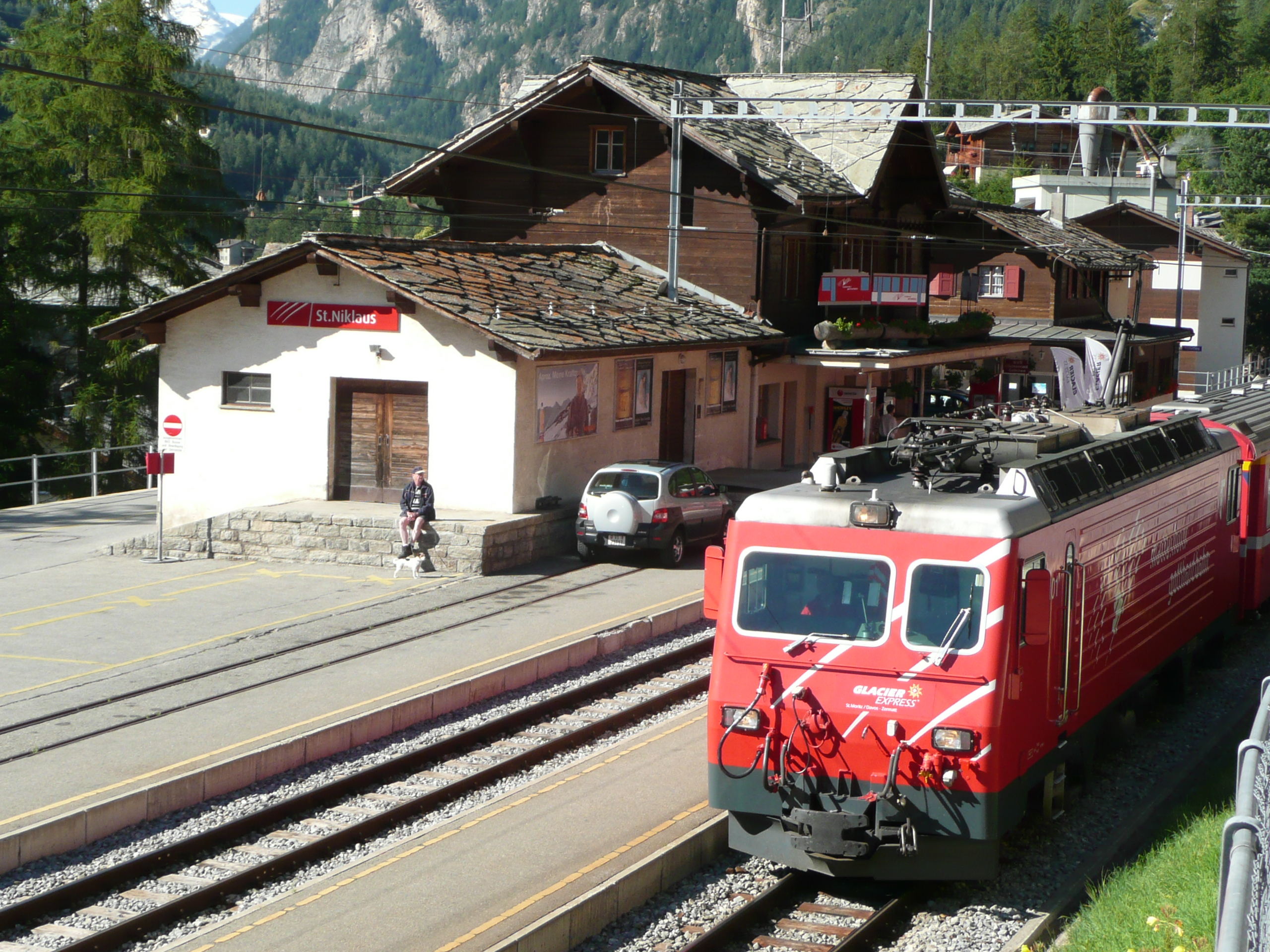
St. Niklaus train station

The main industries in St. Niklaus are two production plants for the companies Scintilla AG and Bosch AG.

As of 2010, St. Niklaus had an unemployment rate of 1.5%. As of 2008, there were 137 people employed in the primary economic sector and about 64 businesses involved in this sector. 613 people were employed in the secondary sector and there were 24 businesses in this sector. 379 people were employed in the tertiary sector, with 68 businesses in this sector. There were 1,093 residents of the municipality who were employed in some capacity, of which females made up 36.4% of the workforce.

In 2008 the total number of full-time equivalent jobs was 950. The number of jobs in the primary sector was 58, of which 52 were in agriculture and 7 were in forestry or lumber production. The number of jobs in the secondary sector was 582 of which 497 or (85.4%) were in manufacturing and 85 (14.6%) were in construction. The number of jobs in the tertiary sector was 310. In the tertiary sector; 43 or 13.9% were in wholesale or retail sales or the repair of motor vehicles, 34 or 11.0% were in the movement and storage of goods, 48 or 15.5% were in a hotel or restaurant, 31 or 10.0% were the insurance or financial industry, 12 or 3.9% were technical professionals or scientists, 54 or 17.4% were in education and 38 or 12.3% were in health care.

In 2000, there were 327 workers who commuted into the municipality and 454 workers who commuted away. The municipality is a net exporter of workers, with about 1.4 workers leaving the municipality for every one entering. About 1.5% of the workforce coming into St. Niklaus are coming from outside Switzerland. Of the working population, 18% used public transportation to get to work, and 49.1% used a private car.

== Religion ==
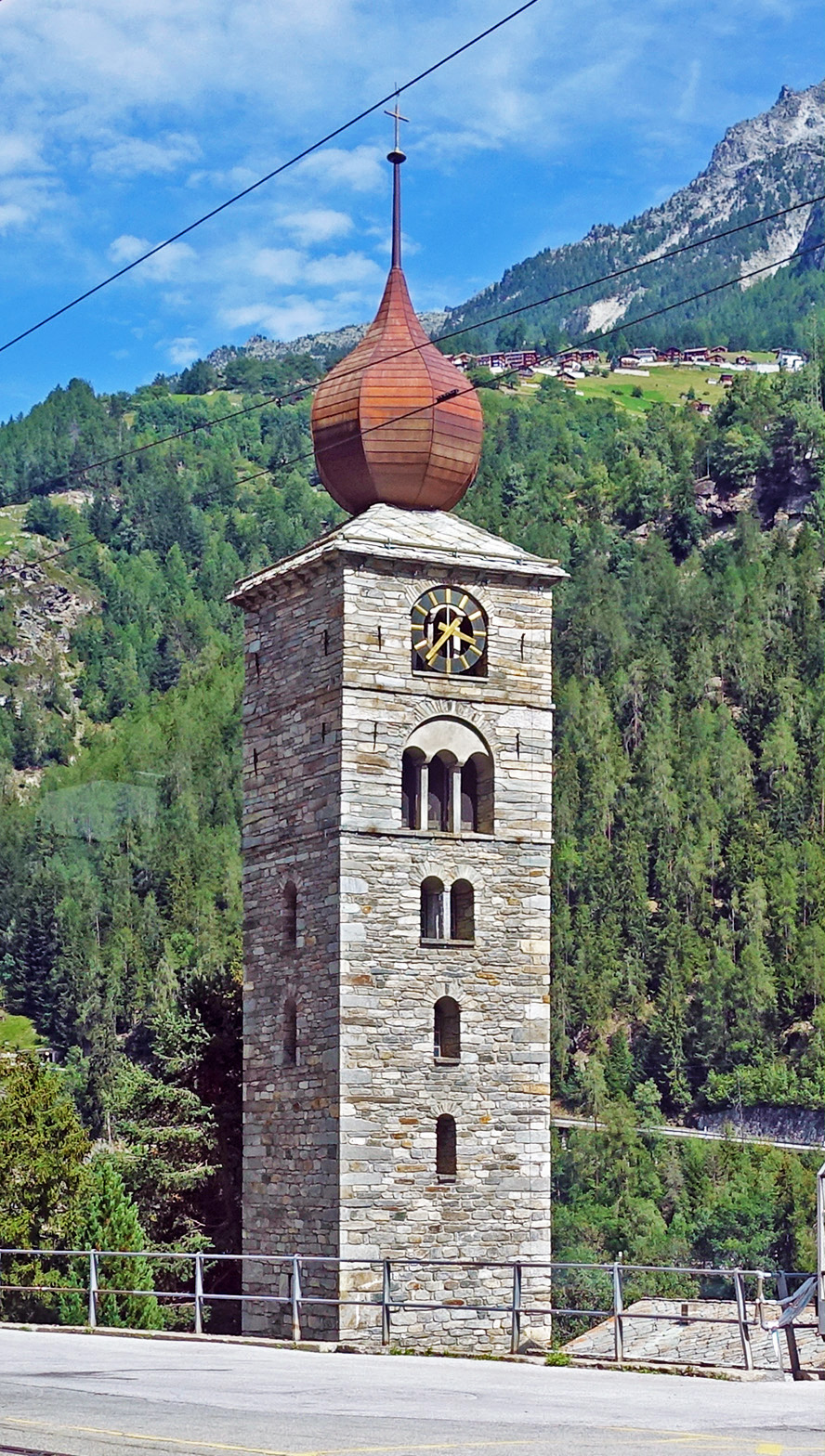
Church in St. Niklaus

From the 2000 census, 2,160 or 93.8% were Roman Catholic, while 54 or 2.3% belonged to the Swiss Reformed Church. Of the rest of the population, there were 23 members of an Orthodox church (or about 1.00% of the population), and there were 25 individuals (or about 1.09% of the population) who belonged to another Christian church. There were 25 (or about 1.09% of the population) who were Islamic. 16 (or about 0.69% of the population) belonged to no church, are agnostic or atheist, and 13 individuals (or about 0.56% of the population) did not answer the question.

== Education ==
In St. Niklaus about 949 or (41.2%) of the population have completed non-mandatory upper secondary education, and 101 or (4.4%) have completed additional higher education (either university or a Fachhochschule). Of the 101 who completed tertiary schooling, 73.3% were Swiss men, 16.8% were Swiss women, 5.9% were non-Swiss men.

As of 2000, there were 36 students in St. Niklaus who came from another municipality, while 24 residents attended schools outside the municipality.

St. Niklaus is home to the Bibliothek Linde library. The library has (as of 2008) 7,000 books or other media, and loaned out 7,197 items in the same year. It was open a total of 180 days with average of 8 hours per week during that year.
