= Distelhorn =

Mountain in Switzerland

- Location within Switzerland

Highest point
- Elevation: 2,830 m (9,280 ft)
- Prominence: 180 m (590 ft)
- Coordinates: 46°11′9.5″N 7°52′15.1″E

Geography
- Location: Valais, Switzerland
- Parent range: Pennine Alps

The Distelhorn is a mountain of the Swiss Pennine Alps, overlooking Grächen in the canton of Valais.
