= Zeneggen =

- Municipality
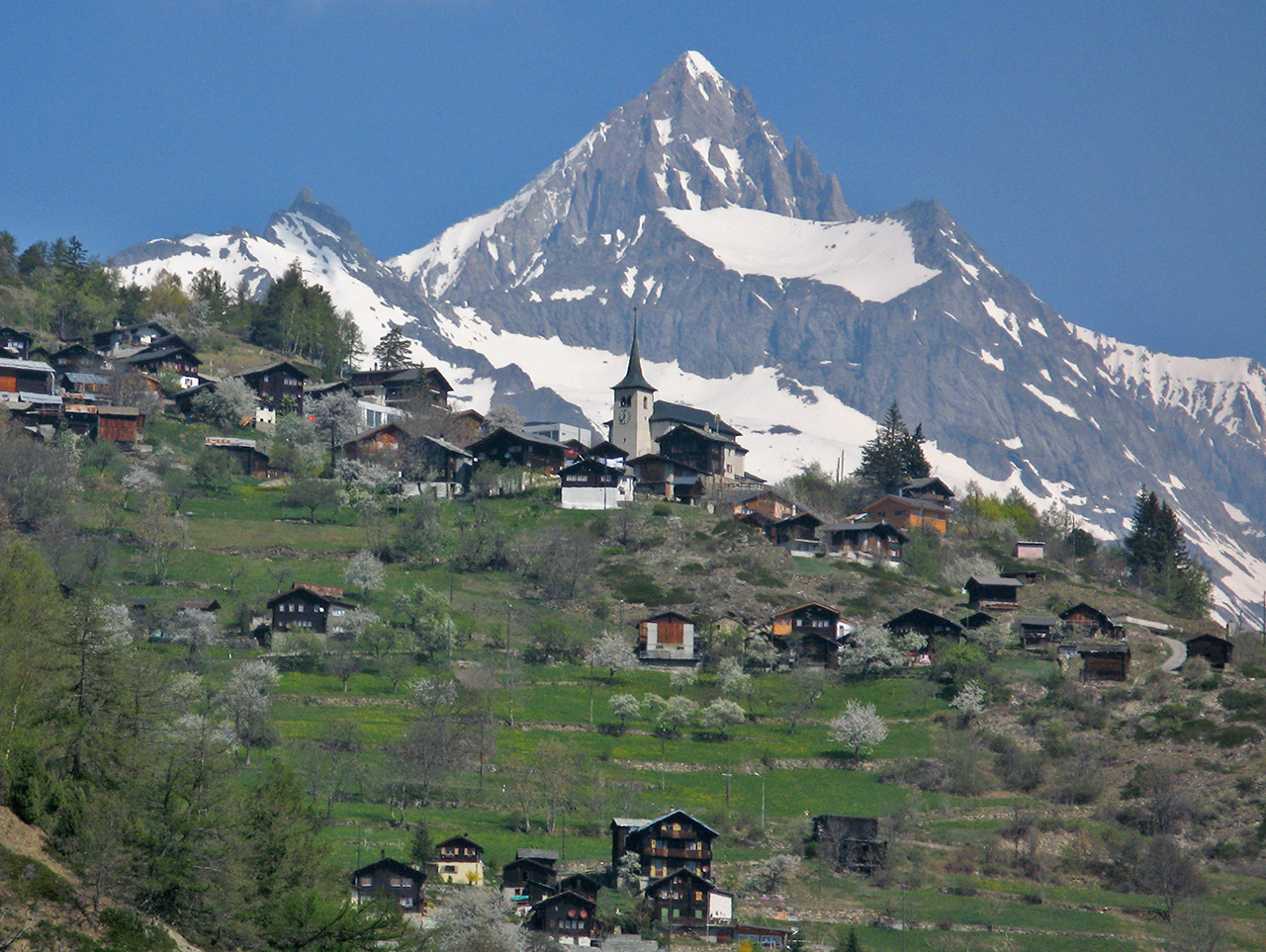
- Zeneggen village

- Flag Coat of arms
- Location of Zeneggen
- Location within Switzerland Location within Canton of Valais
- Coordinates: 46°16′N 7°50′E
- Country: Switzerland
- Canton: Valais
- District: Visp

Government
  - Mayor: Andreas Imstepf

Area
  - Total: 7.51 km^{2} (2.90 sq mi)
- Elevation: 1,370 m (4,490 ft)

Population (December 2002)
  - Total: 255
  - Density: 34.0/km^{2} (87.9/sq mi)
- Time zone: UTC+01:00 (CET)
  - Summer (DST): UTC+02:00 (CEST)
- Postal code: 3934
- SFOS number: 6299
- ISO 3166 code: CH-VS
- Surrounded by: Bürchen, Raron, Stalden, Törbel, Visp, Visperterminen
- Website: zeneggen.ch

Zeneggen is a municipality in the district of Visp in the canton of Valais in Switzerland.

== Geography ==
Zeneggen has an area, as of 2011, of 7.5 square kilometers (2.9 mi^{2}). Of this area, 22.2% is used for agricultural purposes, while 69.5% is forested. Of the rest of the land, 3.7% is settled (buildings or roads) and 4.5% is unproductive land.

== Coat of arms ==
The blazon of the municipal coat of arms is Or, on a Pile wavy inverted Vert two Chevronels inverted Argent and on a chief of the last two Lions rampant reguardant Gules.

== Demographics ==
Zeneggen has a population (as of December 2020) of 295. As of 2008, 2.6% of the population are resident foreign nationals. Over the last 10 years (2000–2010 ) the population has changed at a rate of 0%. It has changed at a rate of 0.8% due to migration and at a rate of 2.9% due to births and deaths.

Most of the population (as of 2000) speaks German (224 or 95.3%) as their first language, English is the second most common (5 or 2.1%) and Serbo-Croatian is the third (3 or 1.3%). There is 1 person who speaks French, 1 person who speaks Italian.

As of 2008, the population was 51.4% male and 48.6% female. The population was made up of 120 Swiss men (49.0% of the population) and 6 (2.4%) non-Swiss men. There were 110 Swiss women (44.9%) and 9 (3.7%) non-Swiss women. Of the population in the municipality, 145 or about 61.7% were born in Zeneggen and lived there in 2000. There were 53 or 22.6% who were born in the same canton, while 14 or 6.0% were born somewhere else in Switzerland, and 17 or 7.2% were born outside of Switzerland.

As of 2000, children and teenagers (0–19 years old) make up 24.3% of the population, while adults (20–64 years old) make up 55.7% and seniors (over 64 years old) make up 20%.

As of 2000, there were 94 people who were single and never married in the municipality. There were 118 married individuals, 18 widows or widowers and 5 individuals who are divorced.

As of 2000, there were 92 private households in the municipality, and an average of 2.5 persons per household. There were 26 households that consist of only one person and 8 households with five or more people. In 2000, a total of 89 apartments (43.4% of the total) were permanently occupied, while 95 apartments (46.3%) were seasonally occupied and 21 apartments (10.2%) were empty. As of 2009, the construction rate of new housing units was 20.4 new units per 1000 residents. The vacancy rate for the municipality, in 2010, was 0.93%.

The historical population is given in the following chart:

== Politics ==
In the 2007 federal election the most popular party was the CVP which received 77.07% of the vote. The next three most popular parties were the SP (12.95%), the SVP (5.43%) and the Green Party (3.08%). In the federal election, a total of 118 votes were cast, and the voter turnout was 62.1%.

In the 2009 Conseil d'État/Staatsrat election a total of 127 votes were cast, of which 3 or about 2.4% were invalid. The voter participation was 68.7%, which is much more than the cantonal average of 54.67%. In the 2007 Swiss Council of States election a total of 118 votes were cast, of which 1 or about 0.8% were invalid. The voter participation was 63.8%, which is similar to the cantonal average of 59.88%.

== Economy ==
As of 2010, Zeneggen had an unemployment rate of 1.3%. As of 2008, there were 33 people employed in the primary economic sector and about 14 businesses involved in this sector. No one was employed in the secondary sector. 13 people were employed in the tertiary sector, with 5 businesses in this sector. There were 98 residents of the municipality who were employed in some capacity, of which females made up 34.7% of the workforce.

In 2008 the total number of full-time equivalent jobs was 25. The number of jobs in the primary sector was 15, all of which were in agriculture. There were no jobs in the secondary sector. The number of jobs in the tertiary sector was 10. In the tertiary sector; 2 were in wholesale or retail sales or the repair of motor vehicles, 5 or 50.0% were in a hotel or restaurant, 1 was a technical professional or scientist, 2 were in education.

In 2000, there were 3 workers who commuted into the municipality and 79 workers who commuted away. The municipality is a net exporter of workers, with about 26.3 workers leaving the municipality for every one entering. Of the working population, 38.8% used public transportation to get to work, and 44.9% used a private car.

== Religion ==
From the 2000 census, 211 or 89.8% were Roman Catholic, while 13 or 5.5% belonged to the Swiss Reformed Church. Of the rest of the population, there were 3 members of an Orthodox church (or about 1.28% of the population). There was 1 individual who was Islamic. 4 (or about 1.70% of the population) belonged to no church, are agnostic or atheist, and 3 individuals (or about 1.28% of the population) did not answer the question.

== Education ==
In Zeneggen about 85 or (36.2%) of the population have completed non-mandatory upper secondary education, and 18 or (7.7%) have completed additional higher education (either university or a Fachhochschule). Of the 18 who completed tertiary schooling, 66.7% were Swiss men, 22.2% were Swiss women.

During the 2010-2011 school year there were a total of 23 students in the Zeneggen school system. The education system in the Canton of Valais allows young children to attend one year of non-obligatory Kindergarten. During that school year, there was one kindergarten class (KG1 or KG2) and 5 kindergarten students. The canton's school system requires students to attend six years of primary school. In Zeneggen there were a total of 2 classes and 23 students in the primary school. The secondary school program consists of three lower, obligatory years of schooling (orientation classes), followed by three to five years of optional, advanced schools. All the lower and upper secondary students from Zeneggen attend their school in a neighboring municipality.

As of 2000, there was one student in Zeneggen who came from another municipality, while 17 residents attended schools outside the municipality.

Zeneggen is home to the Schul- und Gemeindebibliothek (municipal library of Zeneggen). The library has (as of 2008) 2,095 books or other media, and loaned out 1,161 items in the same year. It was open a total of 78 days with average of 2 hours per week during that year.
