= Grächen =

- Municipality
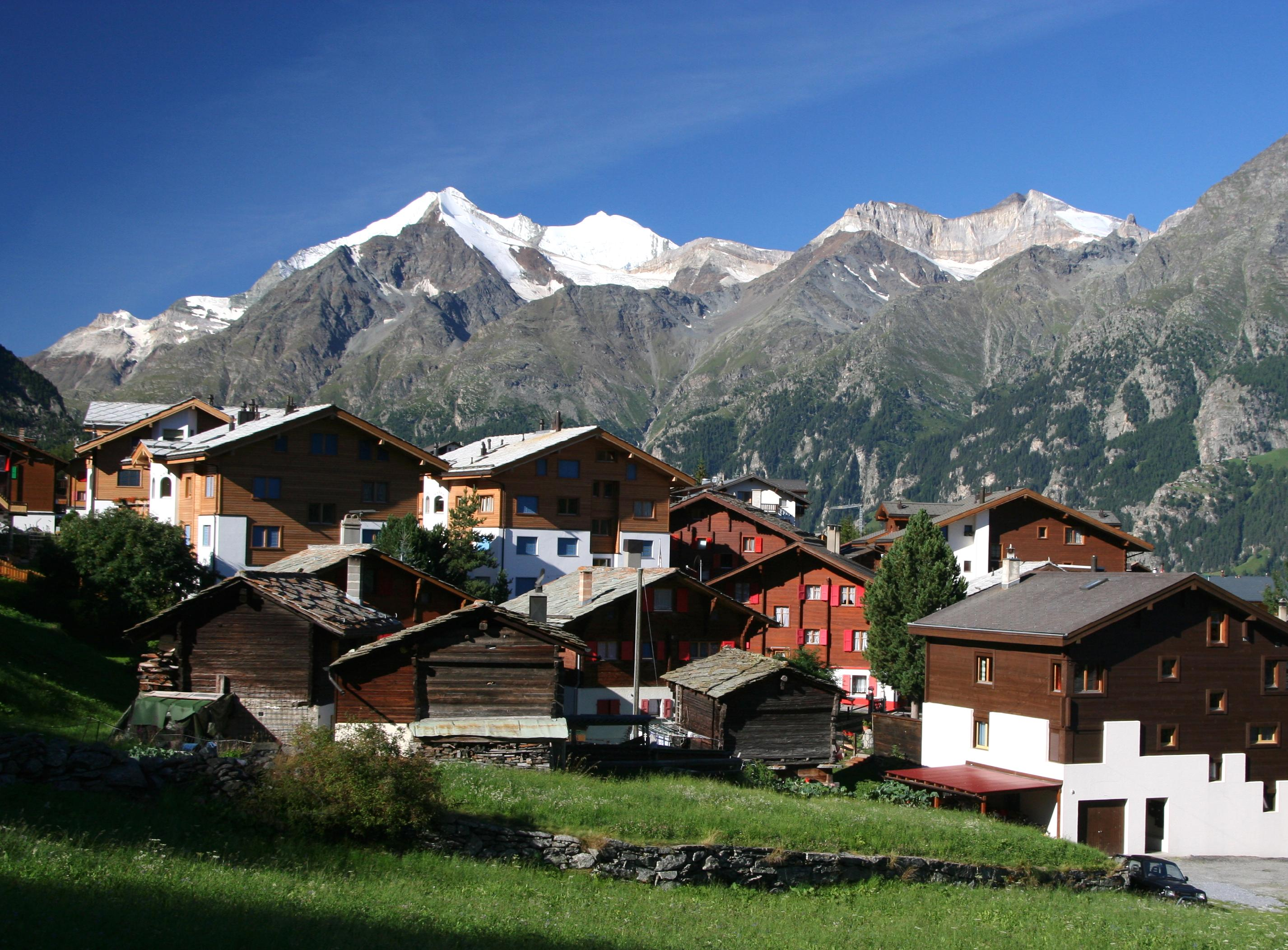

- Flag Coat of arms
- Location of Grächen
- Location within Switzerland Location within Canton of Valais
- Coordinates: 46°10′N 7°49′E
- Country: Switzerland
- Canton: Valais
- District: Visp

Government
  - Mayor: Jakob Walter

Area
  - Total: 14.29 km^{2} (5.52 sq mi)
- Elevation: 1,619 m (5,312 ft)

Population (December 2002)
  - Total: 1,367
  - Density: 95.66/km^{2} (247.8/sq mi)
- Time zone: UTC+01:00 (CET)
  - Summer (DST): UTC+02:00 (CEST)
- Postal code: 3925
- SFOS number: 6285
- ISO 3166 code: CH-VS
- Surrounded by: Eisten, Embd, Sankt Niklaus, Stalden, Törbel
- Website: gemeinde-graechen.ch

Grächen is a municipality in the district of Visp in the canton of Valais in Switzerland.

The village is situated at an altitude of 1,620 meters (5,310 ft) on a terrace above St. Niklaus in the Mattertal, north of the Mischabel range (and Dom).

== History ==
Settlements in the area of Grächen probably date back to Neolithic times. It certainly was a hunting ground for early Bronze Age alpine people (celts List of Celts). Around 750 (CE), the Alamanni started to settle in the upper (German-speaking) part of what is now the canton of Valais.

Grächen is first mentioned in 1210 as de Grachan. In 1250 it was mentioned as de Granges. Grächen developed into a community of farmers in servitude and paying tribute to various feudal lords, until they finally reached their independence as a community (from the Bishop of Sion) in the 19th century.

Thomas Platter, a famous citizen of 16th century Grächen, published his autobiography describing a life from humble beginnings as a goatherd to a fulfilled existence as lord of a manor, master of herbal lore, publisher and school director. His son Felix Platter became a famous medical doctor and anatomist.

== Geography ==
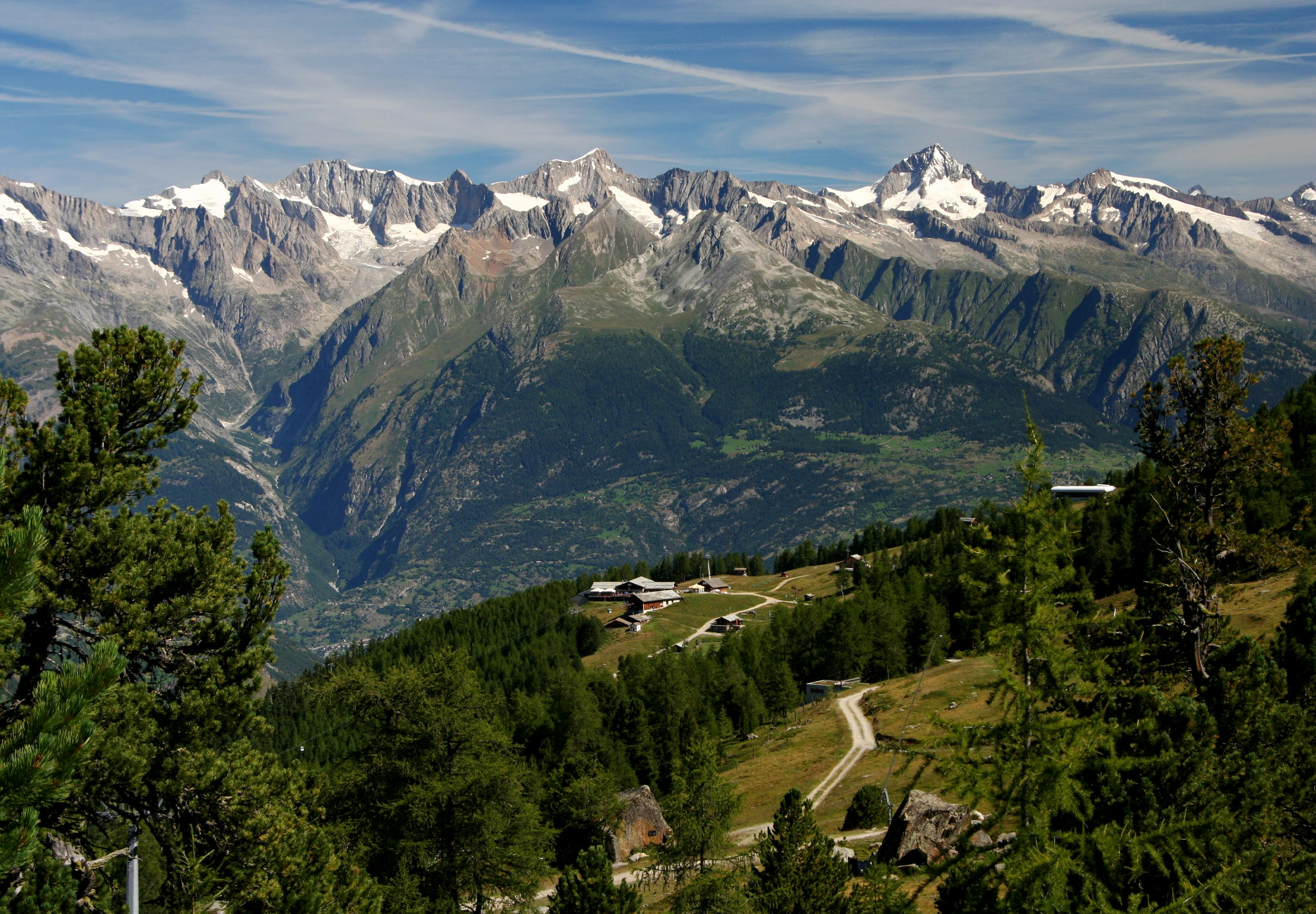
View from Hannigalp above Grächen toward north.

Grächen has an area, as of 2011, of 14.3 square kilometers (5.5 mi^{2}). Of this area, 13.7% is used for agricultural purposes, while 53.7% is forested. Of the rest of the land, 5.1% is settled (buildings or roads) and 27.5% is unproductive land.

The municipality is located in the Visp district, on a terrace below the Ried Glacier. The glacier extends about 5 km (3.1 mi) from Ried to Bärgji and is about 1 km (0.62 mi). The territory of the municipality encompasses the summits of the Seetalhorn and Distelhorn.

== Climate ==
Grächen features a warm summer humid continental climate (Dfb) according to the Köppen climate classification with abundant snowfall during winter and mild summers. Precipitation is spread out evenly throughout the year, as is common in this climate type.

Climate data for Grächen, elevation 1,605 m (5,266 ft), (1991–2020)
Month	Jan	Feb	Mar	Apr	May	Jun	Jul	Aug	Sep	Oct	Nov	Dec	Year
Mean daily maximum °C (°F)	0.9 (33.6)	1.5 (34.7)	5.4 (41.7)	9.3 (48.7)	14.0 (57.2)	18.3 (64.9)	20.4 (68.7)	19.8 (67.6)	15.5 (59.9)	10.8 (51.4)	4.7 (40.5)	1.4 (34.5)	10.2 (50.4)
Daily mean °C (°F)	−2.6 (27.3)	−2.4 (27.7)	0.8 (33.4)	4.4 (39.9)	8.6 (47.5)	12.6 (54.7)	14.6 (58.3)	14.2 (57.6)	10.3 (50.5)	6.2 (43.2)	1.2 (34.2)	−1.7 (28.9)	5.5 (41.9)
Mean daily minimum °C (°F)	−5.4 (22.3)	−5.6 (21.9)	−2.7 (27.1)	0.4 (32.7)	4.3 (39.7)	7.9 (46.2)	9.8 (49.6)	9.9 (49.8)	6.5 (43.7)	3.2 (37.8)	−1.4 (29.5)	−4.4 (24.1)	1.9 (35.4)
Average precipitation mm (inches)	41.6 (1.64)	30.9 (1.22)	36.9 (1.45)	47.0 (1.85)	68.9 (2.71)	58.1 (2.29)	55.5 (2.19)	62.1 (2.44)	43.0 (1.69)	56.7 (2.23)	56.0 (2.20)	50.2 (1.98)	606.9 (23.89)
Average snowfall cm (inches)	39.7 (15.6)	33.6 (13.2)	24.8 (9.8)	18.9 (7.4)	3.9 (1.5)	0.0 (0.0)	0.0 (0.0)	0.0 (0.0)	0.2 (0.1)	8.1 (3.2)	31.7 (12.5)	47.1 (18.5)	208.0 (81.9)
Average precipitation days (≥ 1.0 mm)	6.6	5.9	6.1	6.3	9.0	9.1	8.9	9.2	6.5	6.8	6.8	7.4	88.6
Average snowy days (≥ 1.0 cm)	6.2	6.0	3.8	2.4	0.6	0.0	0.0	0.0	0.1	1.1	4.1	7.1	31.4
Average relative humidity (%)	63	63	61	61	64	64	63	65	67	67	68	65	64
Source 1: NOAA
Source 2: MeteoSwiss

== Coat of arms ==
The blazon of the municipal coat of arms is Azure, issuant from base three Cliffs Or from which are rising as many Pine trees Vert trunked and rooted proper.

== Demographics ==
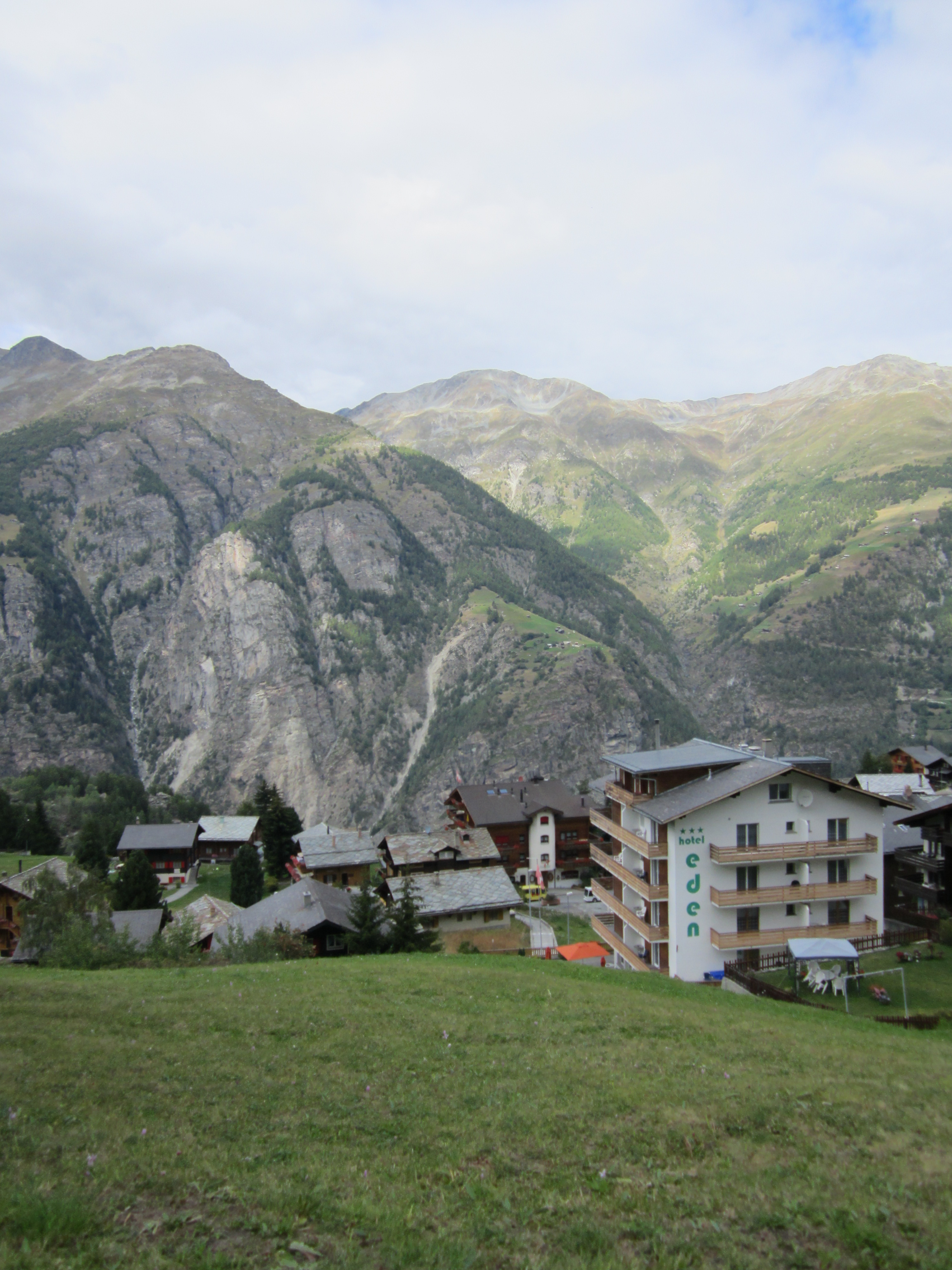
Houses near Grächen

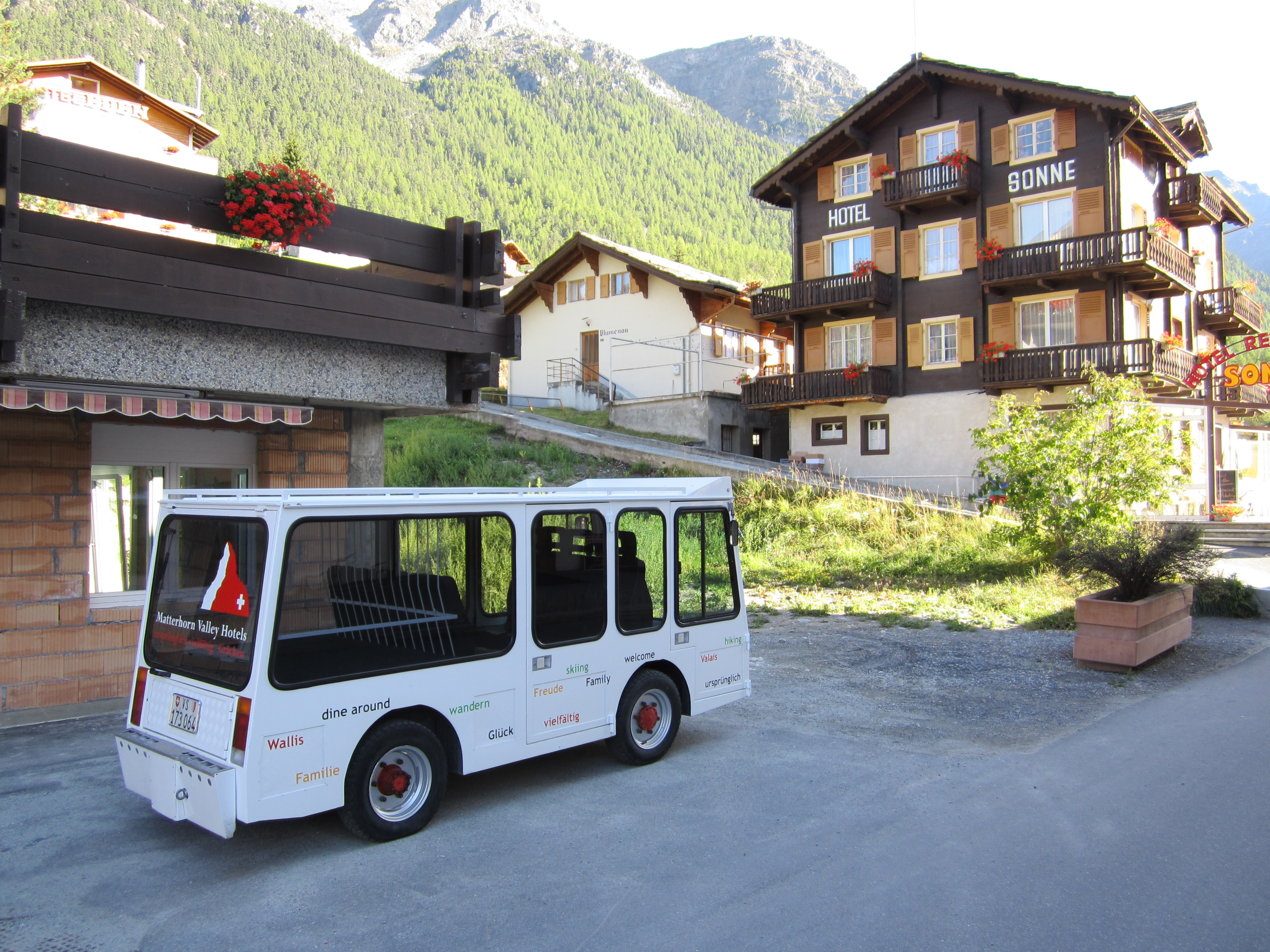
Electric taxi in Grächen

Grächen has a population (as of December 2020) of 1,258. As of 2008, 6.4% of the population are resident foreign nationals. Over the last 10 years (2000–2010 ) the population has changed at a rate of -1.7%. It has changed at a rate of 1.6% due to migration and at a rate of 0.9% due to births and deaths.

Most of the population (as of 2000) speaks German (1,229 or 98.0%) as their first language, Dutch is the second most common (11 or 0.9%) and French is the third (4 or 0.3%). There is 1 person who speaks Italian and 1 person who speaks Romansh.

As of 2008, the population was 48.4% male and 51.6% female. The population was made up of 603 Swiss men (44.2% of the population) and 58 (4.2%) non-Swiss men. There were 650 Swiss women (47.6%) and 54 (4.0%) non-Swiss women. Of the population in the municipality, 888 or about 70.8% were born in Grächen and lived there in 2000. There were 214 or 17.1% who were born in the same canton, while 96 or 7.7% were born somewhere else in Switzerland, and 42 or 3.3% were born outside of Switzerland.

As of 2000, children and teenagers (0–19 years old) make up 26.2% of the population, while adults (20–64 years old) make up 60.3% and seniors (over 64 years old) make up 13.6%.

As of 2000, there were 521 people who were single and never married in the municipality. There were 624 married individuals, 69 widows or widowers and 40 individuals who are divorced.

As of 2000, there were 477 private households in the municipality, and an average of 2.6 persons per household. There were 118 households that consist of only one person and 43 households with five or more people. In 2000, a total of 456 apartments (31.9% of the total) were permanently occupied, while 890 apartments (62.3%) were seasonally occupied and 83 apartments (5.8%) were empty. As of 2009, the construction rate of new housing units was 35.2 new units per 1000 residents. The vacancy rate for the municipality, in 2010, was 1.17%.

The historical population is given in the following chart:

== Politics ==
In the 2007 federal election the most popular party was the CVP which received 75.92% of the vote. The next three most popular parties were the SVP (13.04%), the SP (5.52%) and the FDP (4.26%). In the federal election, a total of 527 votes were cast, and the voter turnout was 50.8%.

In the 2009 Conseil d'État/Staatsrat election a total of 591 votes were cast, of which 44 or about 7.4% were invalid. The voter participation was 57.8%, which is similar to the cantonal average of 54.67%. In the 2007 Swiss Council of States election a total of 523 votes were cast, of which 32 or about 6.1% were invalid. The voter participation was 50.9%, which is much less than the cantonal average of 59.88%.

== Economy ==
As of 2010, Grächen had an unemployment rate of 2.6%. As of 2008, there were 49 people employed in the primary economic sector and about 29 businesses involved in this sector. 61 people were employed in the secondary sector and there were 12 businesses in this sector. 356 people were employed in the tertiary sector, with 81 businesses in this sector. There were 592 residents of the municipality who were employed in some capacity, of which females made up 38.9% of the workforce.

In 2008 the total number of full-time equivalent jobs was 379. The number of jobs in the primary sector was 13, all of which were in agriculture. The number of jobs in the secondary sector was 59 of which or (0.0%) were in manufacturing and 56 (94.9%) were in construction. The number of jobs in the tertiary sector was 307. In the tertiary sector; 69 or 22.5% were in wholesale or retail sales or the repair of motor vehicles, 51 or 16.6% were in the movement and storage of goods, 124 or 40.4% were in a hotel or restaurant, 8 or 2.6% were the insurance or financial industry, 3 or 1.0% were technical professionals or scientists, 8 or 2.6% were in education and 8 or 2.6% were in health care.

In 2000, there were 78 workers who commuted into the municipality and 222 workers who commuted away. The municipality is a net exporter of workers, with about 2.8 workers leaving the municipality for every one entering. Of the working population, 14.2% used public transportation to get to work, and 39% used a private car.

== Tourism ==
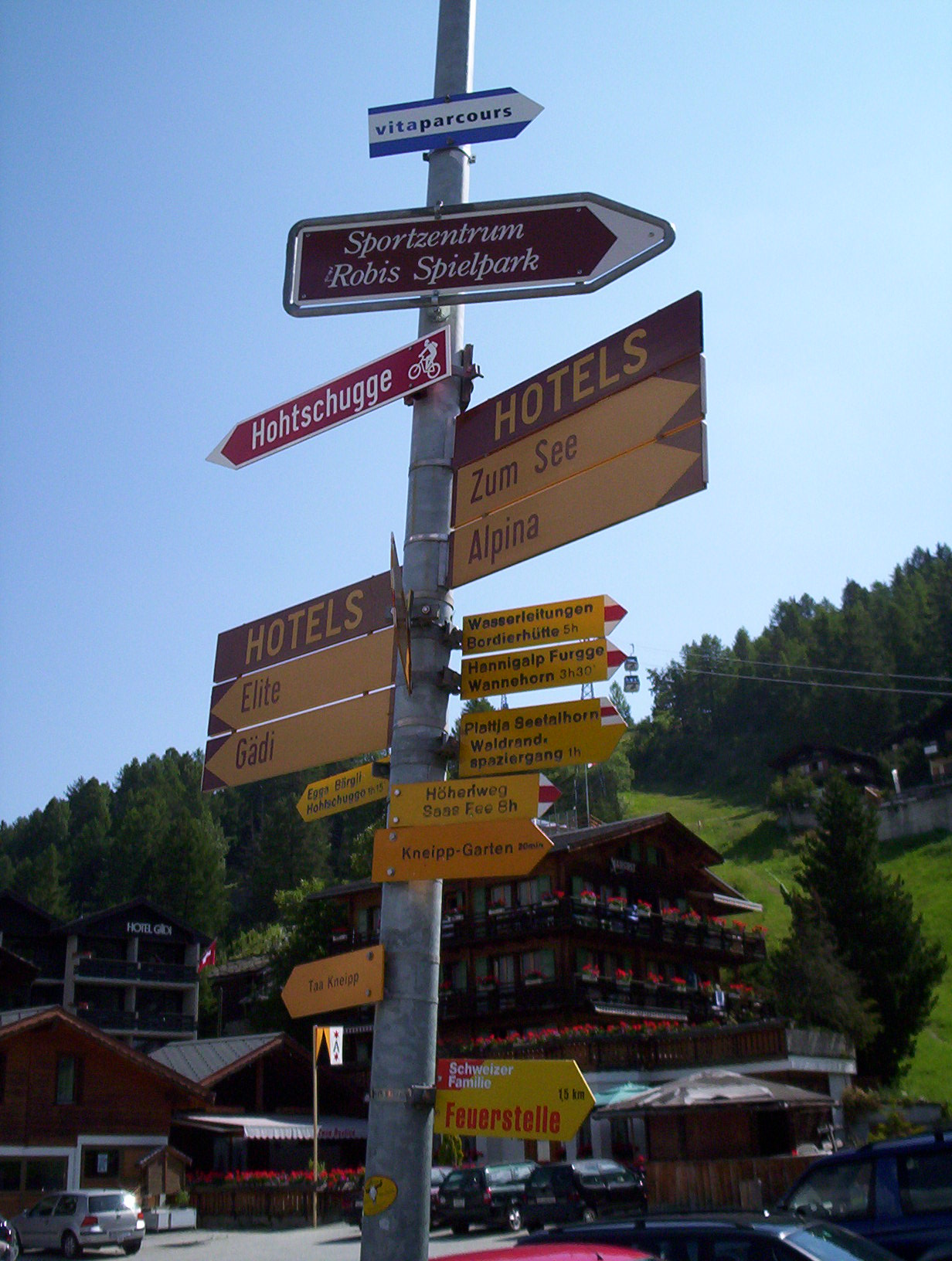
Signs in Grächen

In the 20th century, Grächen changed from a farming community to a popular tourist destination. In 1937, 7000 visitors spent the night there, today, some 500,000 visitors do.

Grächen is situated on the Monte Rosa tour hiking trail and provides for a natural stop between Saas-Fee and Europahütte. It is also a base for many hiking and mountaineering trips.

Grächen has a ski resort with around 40 km (25 mi) of ridable slopes with 11 total ski lifts – the resort features a restaurant and offers lessons in both skiing and snowboarding. It is situated between the elevations of 1619 and 2864 metres. Its opening season spans from mid-December to early April. In 2011, a plan to renovate and enlarge the ski area was launched.

Grächen also attracts many people due to its proximity to Zermatt and to Saas-Fee, two major ski resorts.

== Sport ==
Grächen hosts the 2019 UCI Mountain Bike Marathon World Championships on 22 September 2019.

== Religion ==
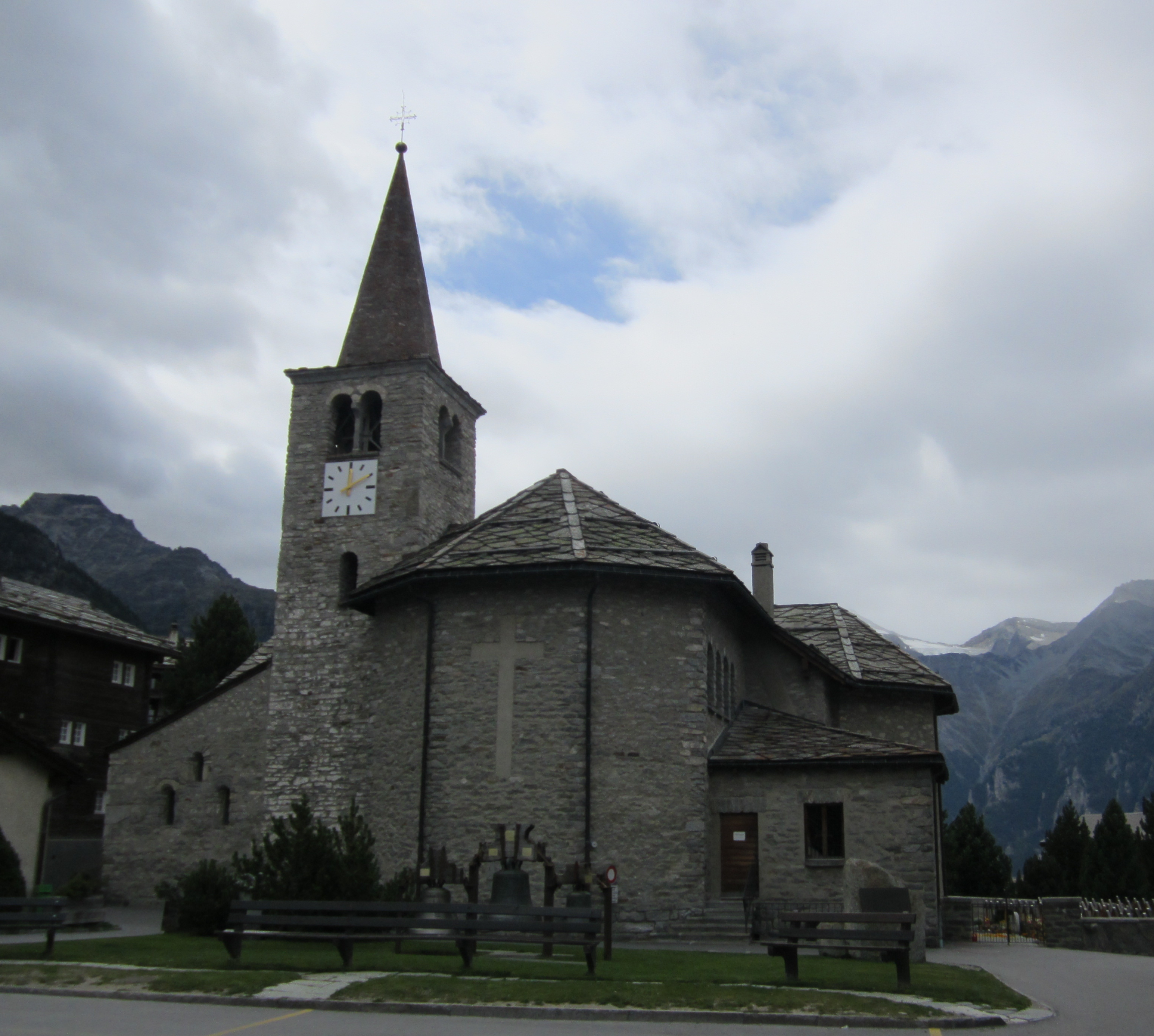
Church in Grächen

From the 2000 census, 1,166 or 93.0% were Roman Catholic, while 46 or 3.7% belonged to the Swiss Reformed Church. Of the rest of the population, there were 5 members of an Orthodox church (or about 0.40% of the population), and there were 13 individuals (or about 1.04% of the population) who belonged to another Christian church. There were 4 (or about 0.32% of the population) who were Islamic. There were 2 individuals who were Buddhist. 11 (or about 0.88% of the population) belonged to no church, are agnostic or atheist, and 13 individuals (or about 1.04% of the population) did not answer the question.

== Education ==
In Grächen about 488 or (38.9%) of the population have completed non-mandatory upper secondary education, and 69 or (5.5%) have completed additional higher education (either university or a Fachhochschule). Of the 69 who completed tertiary schooling, 73.9% were Swiss men, 17.4% were Swiss women.

During the 2010–11 school year there were a total of 104 students in the Grächen school system. The education system in the Canton of Valais allows young children to attend one year of non-obligatory Kindergarten. During that school year, there was one kindergarten class (KG1 or KG2) and 18 kindergarten students. The canton's school system requires students to attend six years of primary school. In Grächen there were a total of 5 classes and 104 students in the primary school. The secondary school program consists of three lower, obligatory years of schooling (orientation classes), followed by three to five years of optional, advanced schools. All the lower and upper secondary students from Grächen attend their school in a neighboring municipality.

As of 2000, there were 43 students from Grächen who attended schools outside the municipality.
