= Saas-Balen =

Saas Balen
- Municipality
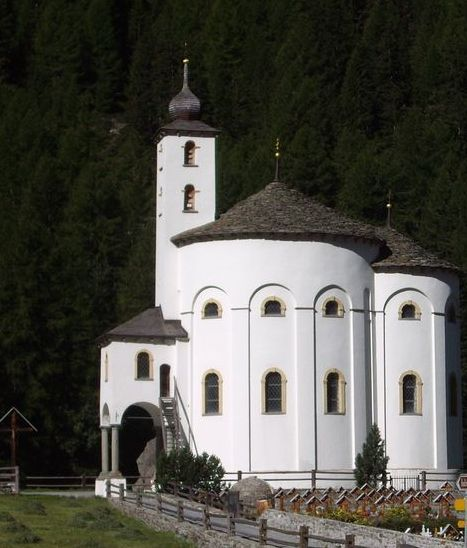
- Church Saas-Balen

- Flag Coat of arms
- Location of Saas Balen
- Location within Switzerland Location within Canton of Valais
- Coordinates: 46°8′N 7°55′E
- Country: Switzerland
- Canton: Valais
- District: Visp

Area
  - Total: 30.22 km^{2} (11.67 sq mi)
- Elevation: 1,483 m (4,865 ft)

Population (December 2002)
  - Total: 400
  - Density: 13/km^{2} (34/sq mi)
- Time zone: UTC+01:00 (CET)
  - Summer (DST): UTC+02:00 (CEST)
- Postal code: 3908
- SFOS number: 6289
- ISO 3166 code: CH-VS
- Surrounded by: Eisten, Saas Fee, Saas Grund, St. Nicklaus, Simplon
- Website: saasbalen.ch

Saas-Balen is a municipality in the district of Visp in the canton of Valais in Switzerland. It lies at the foot of the Mischabelhörner and Dom.

== History ==
Saas-Balen is first mentioned in 1304 as baln.

== Geography ==
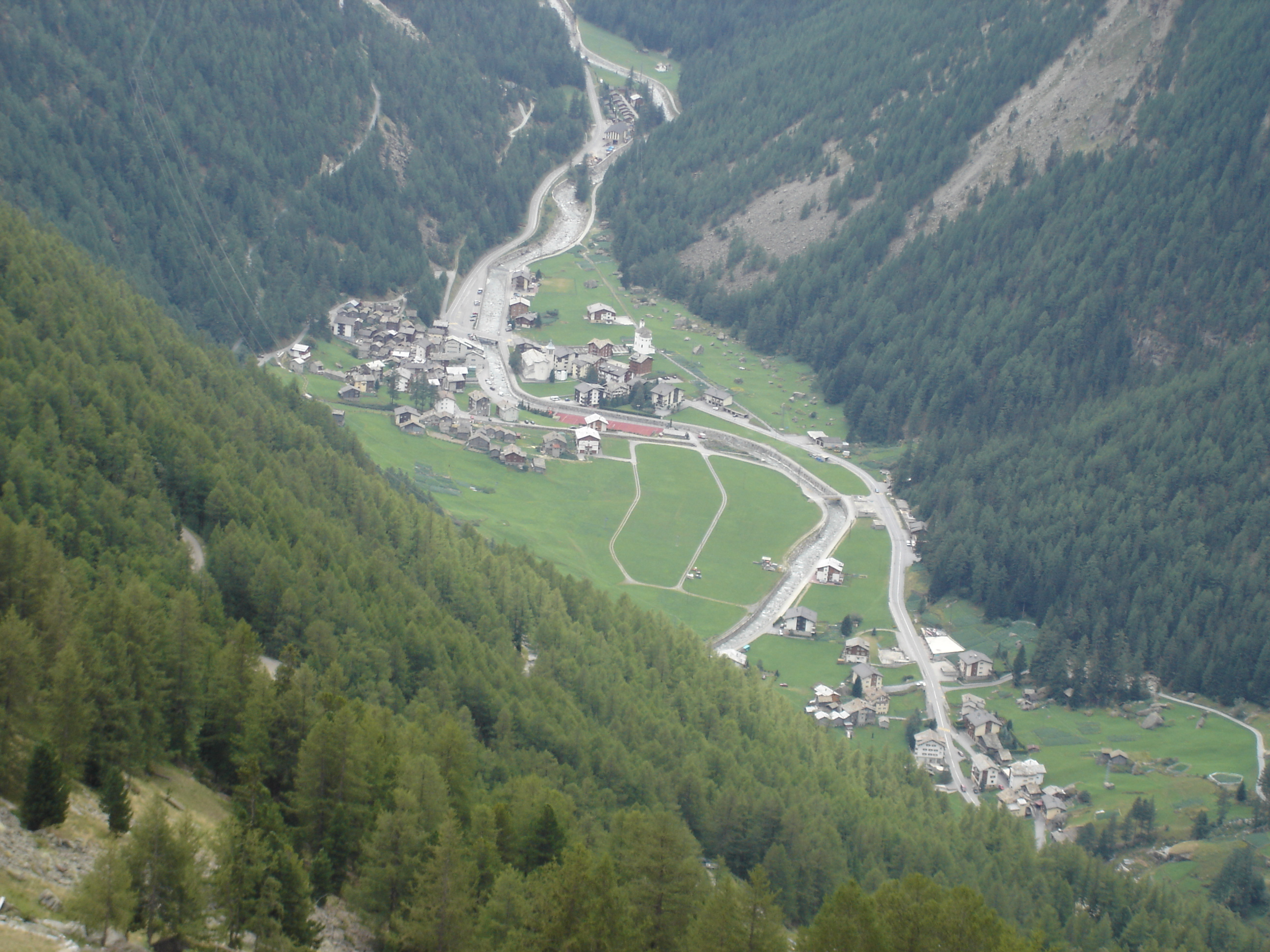
Saas-Balen and surrounding valley

Saas-Balen has an area, as of 2011, of 30.2 square kilometers (11.7 mi^{2}). Of this area, 10.7% is used for agricultural purposes, while 22.7% is forested. Of the rest of the land, 1.3% is settled (buildings or roads) and 65.4% is unproductive land.

The municipality is located in the Visp district. It has the smallest area of any municipality in the Saas valley. It consists of the village of Saas-Balen and the hamlets of Niedergut (Ausser-Balen), Bidermatten and a part of Tamatten (Inner-Balen) as well as 25 small, alpine settlements.

== Coat of arms ==
The blazon of the municipal coat of arms is Azure, on Ground Vert a path Argent embowed passing into a cave entrance Sable of a Cliff Argent.

== Demographics ==
Saas-Balen has a population (as of December 2020) of 351. As of 2008, 6.2% of the population are resident foreign nationals. Over the last 10 years (2000–2010 ) the population has changed at a rate of -4.6%. It has changed at a rate of 0.2% due to migration and at a rate of -2.7% due to births and deaths.

Most of the population (as of 2000) speaks German (390 or 98.2%) as their first language, French is the second most common (2 or 0.5%) and Serbo-Croatian is the third (2 or 0.5%).

Of the population in the municipality, 325 or about 81.9% were born in Saas-Balen and lived there in 2000. There were 40 or 10.1% who were born in the same canton, while 16 or 4.0% were born somewhere else in Switzerland, and 14 or 3.5% were born outside of Switzerland.

As of 2000, children and teenagers (0–19 years old) make up 25.9% of the population, while adults (20–64 years old) make up 56.9% and seniors (over 64 years old) make up 17.1%.

As of 2000, there were 168 people who were single and never married in the municipality. There were 197 married individuals, 24 widows or widowers and 8 individuals who are divorced.

As of 2000, there were 123 private households in the municipality, and an average of 3.1 persons per household. There were 21 households that consist of only one person and 18 households with five or more people. In 2000, a total of 114 apartments (57.6% of the total) were permanently occupied, while 66 apartments (33.3%) were seasonally occupied and 18 apartments (9.1%) were empty. The vacancy rate for the municipality, in 2010, was 1.96%.

The historical population is given in the following chart:

== Heritage sites of national significance ==
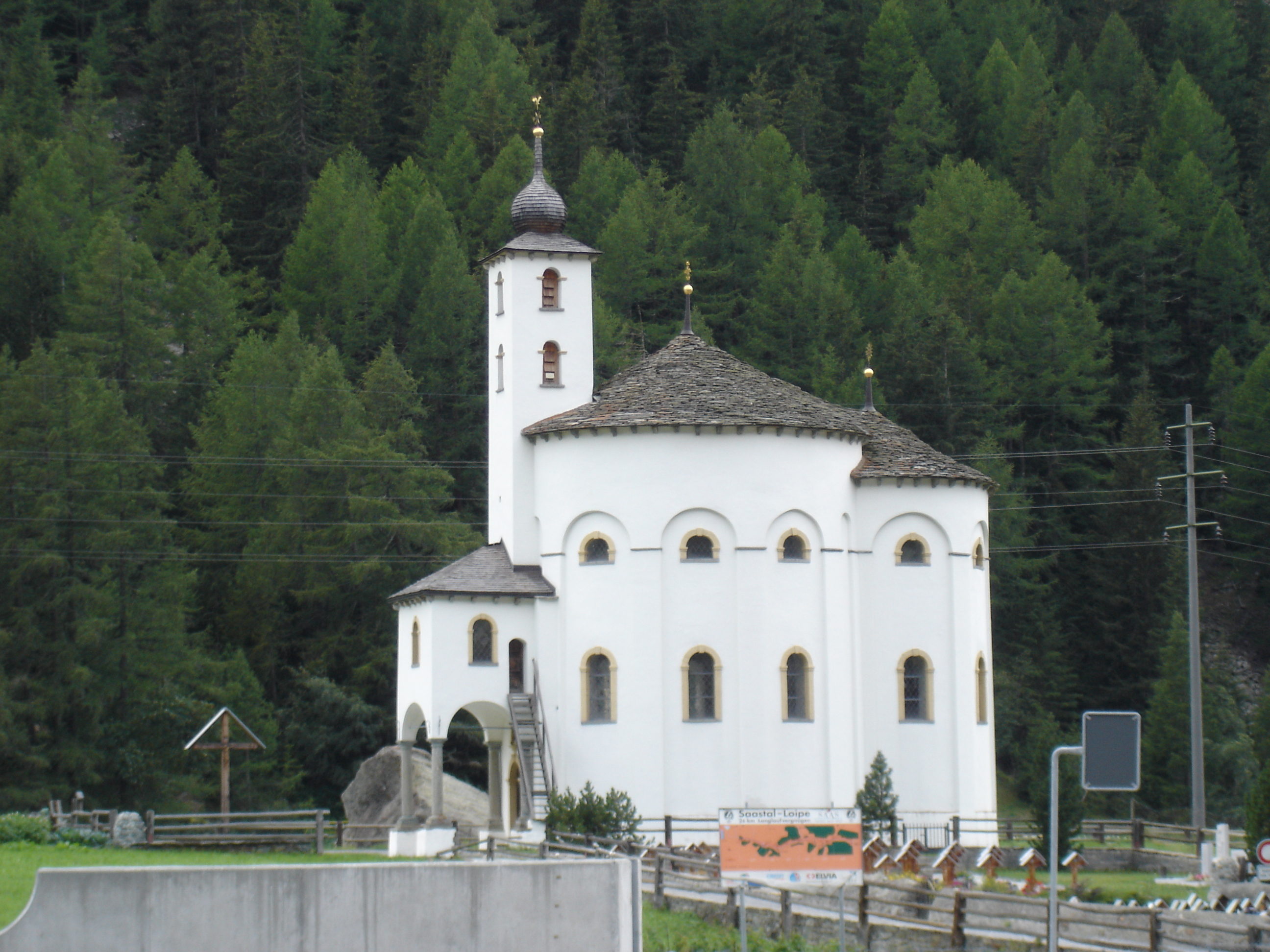
Church of Mariä Himmelfahrt

The Church of Mariä Himmelfahrt is listed as a Swiss heritage site of national significance. The entire hamlet of Bidermatten is part of the Inventory of Swiss Heritage Sites.

== Politics ==
In the 2007 federal election the most popular party was the CVP which received 70.13% of the vote. The next three most popular parties were the SVP (12.95%), the FDP (10.9%) and the SP (4.94%). In the federal election, a total of 227 votes were cast, and the voter turnout was 71.4%.

In the 2009 Conseil d'État/Staatsrat election a total of 274 votes were cast, of which 13 or about 4.7% were invalid. The voter participation was 88.7%, which is much more than the cantonal average of 54.67%. In the 2007 Swiss Council of States election a total of 225 votes were cast, of which 6 or about 2.7% were invalid. The voter participation was 71.2%, which is much more than the cantonal average of 59.88%.

== Economy ==
As of 2010, Saas-Balen had an unemployment rate of 1.9%. As of 2008, there were 25 people employed in the primary economic sector and about 14 businesses involved in this sector. 7 people were employed in the secondary sector and there were 2 businesses in this sector. 45 people were employed in the tertiary sector, with 8 businesses in this sector. There were 179 residents of the municipality who were employed in some capacity, of which females made up 41.9% of the workforce.

In 2008 the total number of full-time equivalent jobs was 51. The number of jobs in the primary sector was 8, all of which were in agriculture. The number of jobs in the secondary sector was 7 of which 2 or (28.6%) were in manufacturing and 5 (71.4%) were in construction. The number of jobs in the tertiary sector was 36. In the tertiary sector; 11 or 30.6% were in wholesale or retail sales or the repair of motor vehicles, 22 or 61.1% were in a hotel or restaurant.

In 2000, there were 12 workers who commuted into the municipality and 149 workers who commuted away. The municipality is a net exporter of workers, with about 12.4 workers leaving the municipality for every one entering. Of the working population, 27.9% used public transportation to get to work, and 57.5% used a private car.

== Religion ==
From the 2000 census, 378 or 95.2% were Roman Catholic, while 8 or 2.0% belonged to the Swiss Reformed Church. Of the rest of the population, there were 10 members of an Orthodox church (or about 2.52% of the population).

== Education ==
In Saas-Balen about 150 or (37.8%) of the population have completed non-mandatory upper secondary education, and 12 or (3.0%) have completed additional higher education (either university or a Fachhochschule). Of the 12 who completed tertiary schooling, 75.0% were Swiss men, 16.7% were Swiss women.

During the 2010–2011 school year there were a total of 8 students in the Saas-Balen school system. The education system in the Canton of Valais allows young children to attend one year of non-obligatory Kindergarten. During that school year, there were no kindergarten classes (KG1 or KG2) and there were no kindergarten students. The canton's school system requires students to attend six years of primary school. In Saas-Balen there was one class and 8 students in the primary school. The secondary school program consists of three lower, obligatory years of schooling (orientation classes), followed by three to five years of optional, advanced schools. All the lower and upper secondary students from Saas-Balen attend their school in a neighboring municipality.

As of 2000, there were 71 students from Saas-Balen who attended schools outside the municipality.
