= Stalden =

- Municipality
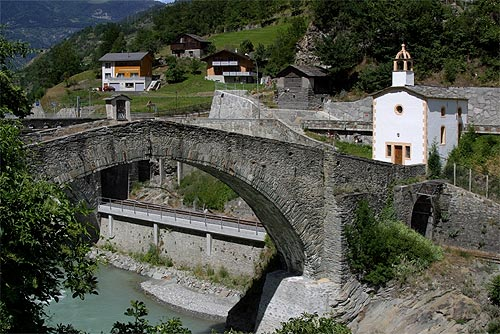

- Flag Coat of arms
- Location of Stalden
- Location within Switzerland Location within Canton of Valais
- Coordinates: 46°14′N 7°52′E
- Country: Switzerland
- Canton: Valais
- District: Visp

Government
  - Mayor: Egon Furrer

Area
  - Total: 10.4 km^{2} (4.0 sq mi)
- Elevation: 795 m (2,608 ft)

Population (December 2002)
  - Total: 1,229
  - Density: 118/km^{2} (306/sq mi)
- Time zone: UTC+01:00 (CET)
  - Summer (DST): UTC+02:00 (CEST)
- Postal code: 3922
- SFOS number: 6293
- ISO 3166 code: CH-VS
- Surrounded by: Eisten, Grächen, Staldenried, Törbel, Visperterminen, Zeneggen
- Website: www.stalden.ch

Stalden (German pronunciation: [ˈʃtaldn̩]) is a municipality in the district of Visp in the canton of Valais in Switzerland. It lies at the foot of the Mischabelhörner and Dom (4,545 m [14,911 ft]).

== History ==
Stalden is first mentioned in 1213 as Morgi. In 1224 it was mentioned as Staldun.

== Geography ==
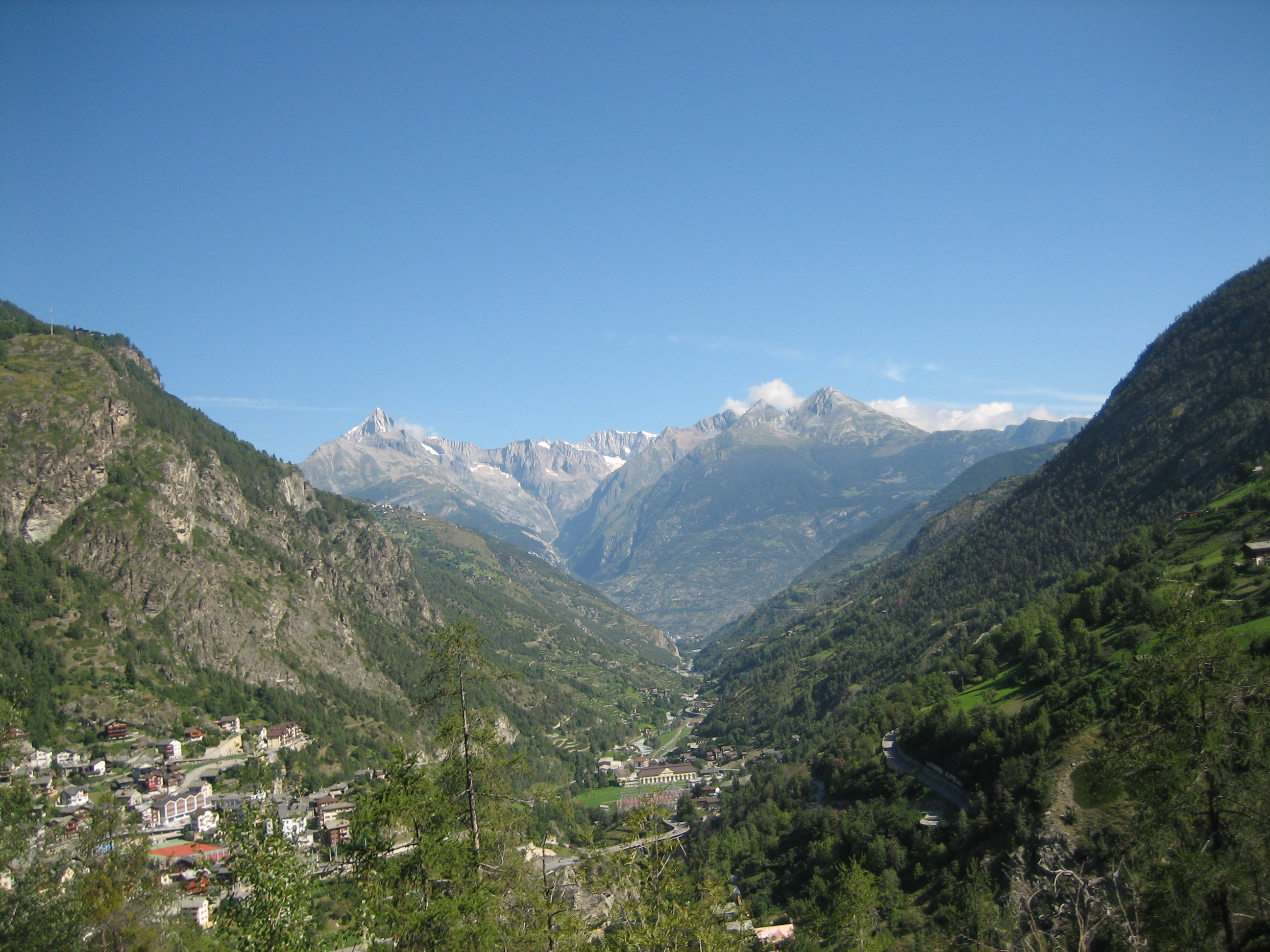
Visp valley at Stalden

Stalden has an area, as of 2011, of 10.5 square kilometers (4.1 mi^{2}). Of this area, 10.0% is used for agricultural purposes, while 71.9% is forested. Of the rest of the land, 6.4% is settled (buildings or roads) and 11.7% is unproductive land.

The municipality is located in the Visp district, at the branching of the Matter and Saas valleys. It consists of three formerly independent villages Stalden Dorfmark, Chinegga (since 1805) and Niederrusen (since 1817, now called Neubrück).

Being well within the Alps, the region of Stalden is notably the driest location in Valais and Switzerland, with 545 mm of rainfall per year measured at the Ackersand meteorological station. In comparison, Locarno (south side of the Alps) receives 1897 mm of rain per year.

== Coat of arms ==
The blazon of the municipal coat of arms is Gules, two Lions rampant regaurdant Or both holding a Sword Argent on Coupeaux Vert.

== Demographics ==
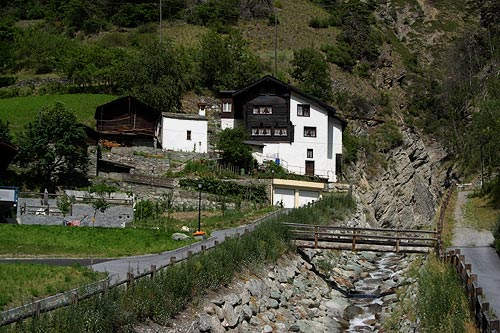
House in Stalden

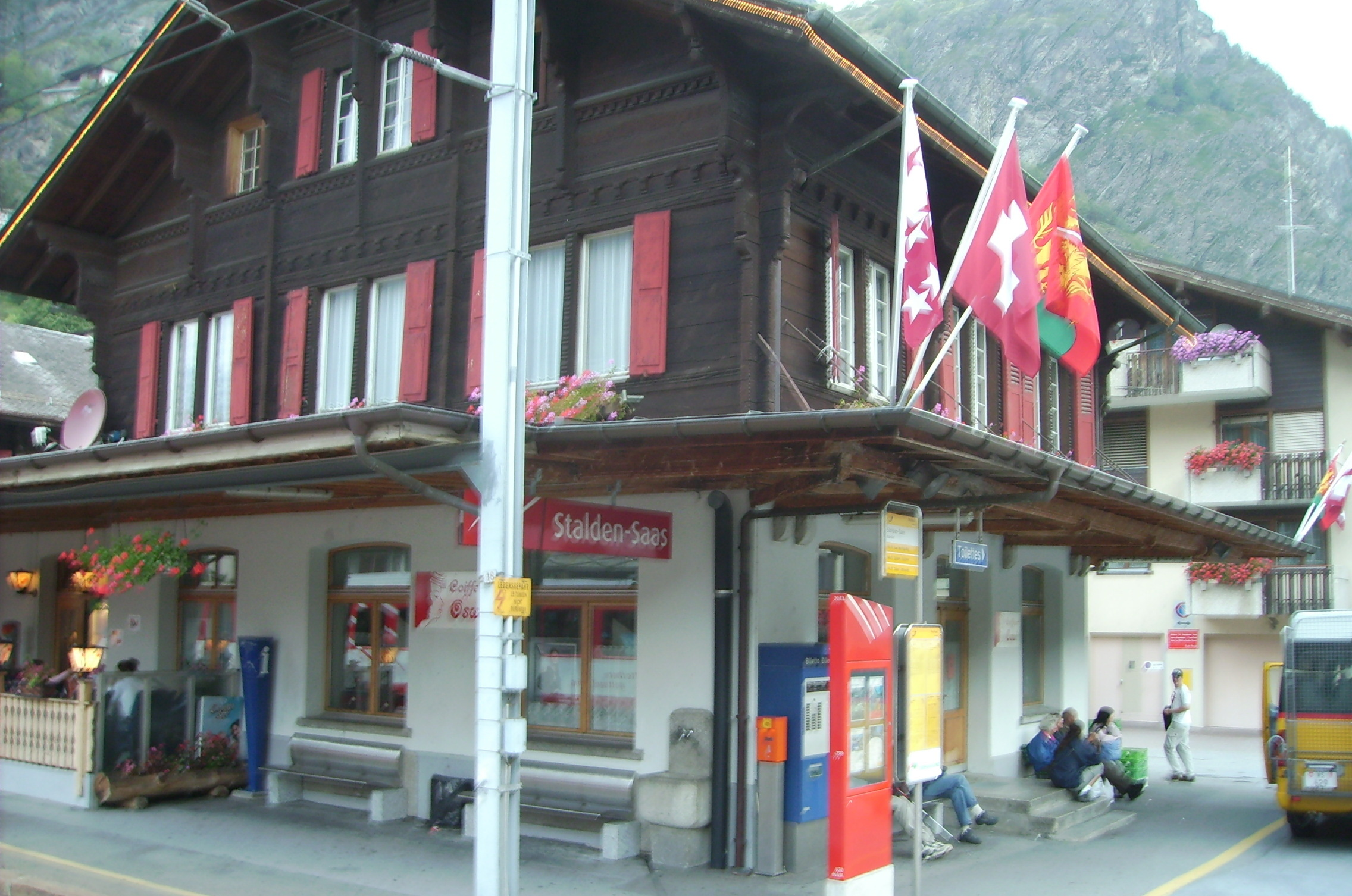
Train and bus station in Stalden

Stalden has a population (as of December 2020) of 1,052. As of 2008, 4.2% of the population are resident foreign nationals. Over the last 10 years (2000–2010 ) the population has changed at a rate of -9.8%. It has changed at a rate of -8.9% due to migration and at a rate of -0.6% due to births and deaths.

Most of the population (as of 2000) speaks German (1,118 or 97.3%) as their first language, Albanian is the second most common (9 or 0.8%) and Italian is the third (7 or 0.6%). There are 6 people who speak French.

As of 2008, the population was 46.1% male and 53.9% female. The population was made up of 488 Swiss men (43.2% of the population) and 33 (2.9%) non-Swiss men. There were 581 Swiss women (51.5%) and 27 (2.4%) non-Swiss women. Of the population in the municipality, 728 or about 63.4% were born in Stalden and lived there in 2000. There were 300 or 26.1% who were born in the same canton, while 46 or 4.0% were born somewhere else in Switzerland, and 58 or 5.0% were born outside of Switzerland.

As of 2000, children and teenagers (0–19 years old) make up 26.7% of the population, while adults (20–64 years old) make up 55.8% and seniors (over 64 years old) make up 17.5%.

As of 2000, there were 469 people who were single and never married in the municipality. There were 583 married individuals, 71 widows or widowers and 26 individuals who are divorced.

As of 2000, there were 432 private households in the municipality, and an average of 2.6 persons per household. There were 109 households that consist of only one person and 41 households with five or more people. In 2000, a total of 406 apartments (77.0% of the total) were permanently occupied, while 76 apartments (14.4%) were seasonally occupied and 45 apartments (8.5%) were empty. The vacancy rate for the municipality, in 2010, was 1.11%.

The historical population is given in the following chart:

== Heritage sites of national significance ==
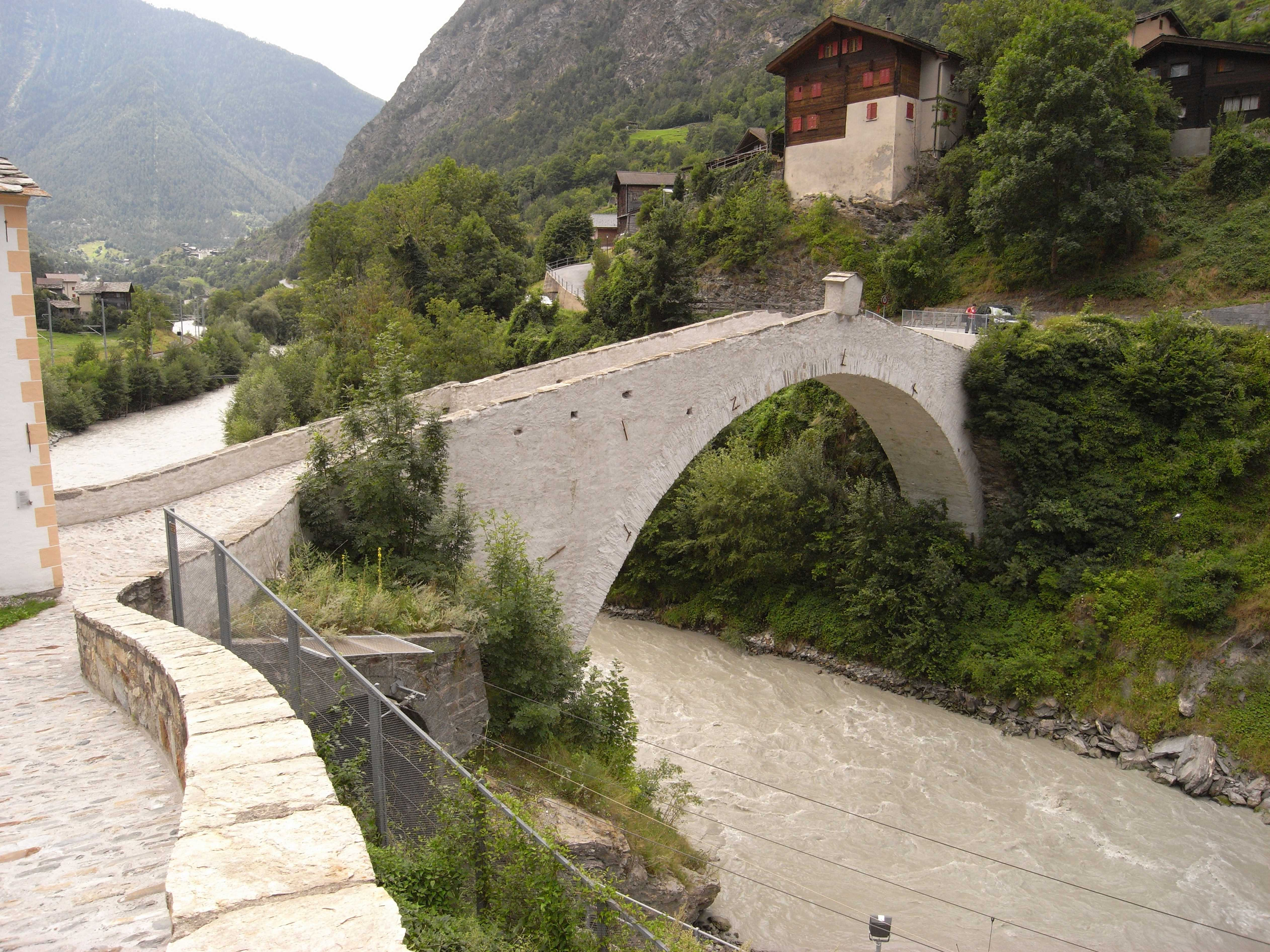
Bridge in Stalden

The Kinbrücke (bridge) over the Mattervispa along with its wayside shrine is listed as a Swiss heritage site of national significance. The village of Stalden and the Neubrück area are both part of the Inventory of Swiss Heritage Sites.

== Politics ==
In the 2007 federal election the most popular party was the CVP which received 70.37% of the vote. The next three most popular parties were the SVP (20.55%), the SP (5.66%) and the FDP (1.89%). In the federal election, a total of 561 votes were cast, and the voter turnout was 62.4%.

In the 2009 Conseil d'État/Staatsrat election a total of 629 votes were cast, of which 37 or about 5.9% were invalid. The voter participation was 70.4%, which is much more than the cantonal average of 54.67%. In the 2007 Swiss Council of States election a total of 552 votes were cast, of which 16 or about 2.9% were invalid. The voter participation was 62.1%, which is similar to the cantonal average of 59.88%.

== Economy ==
As of 2010, Stalden had an unemployment rate of 1.2%. As of 2008, there were 39 people employed in the primary economic sector and about 18 businesses involved in this sector. 95 people were employed in the secondary sector and there were 17 businesses in this sector. 218 people were employed in the tertiary sector, with 38 businesses in this sector. There were 501 residents of the municipality who were employed in some capacity, of which females made up 40.5% of the workforce.

In 2008 the total number of full-time equivalent jobs was 278. The number of jobs in the primary sector was 14, all of which were in agriculture. The number of jobs in the secondary sector was 90 of which 34 or (37.8%) were in manufacturing and 30 (33.3%) were in construction. The number of jobs in the tertiary sector was 174. In the tertiary sector; 63 or 36.2% were in wholesale or retail sales or the repair of motor vehicles, 40 or 23.0% were in the movement and storage of goods, 23 or 13.2% were in a hotel or restaurant, 1 was in the information industry, 7 or 4.0% were the insurance or financial industry, 6 or 3.4% were technical professionals or scientists, 15 or 8.6% were in education and 9 or 5.2% were in health care.

In 2000, there were 151 workers who commuted into the municipality and 324 workers who commuted away. The municipality is a net exporter of workers, with about 2.1 workers leaving the municipality for every one entering. About 6.6% of the workforce coming into Stalden are coming from outside Switzerland. Of the working population, 27.9% used public transportation to get to work, and 50.7% used a private car.

== Religion ==
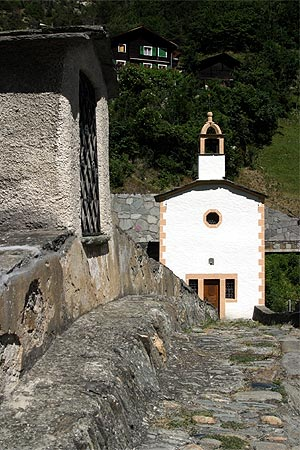
Bridge with wayside shrine and village church

From the 2000 census, 1,076 or 93.6% were Roman Catholic, while 14 or 1.2% belonged to the Swiss Reformed Church. Of the rest of the population, there were 4 members of an Orthodox church (or about 0.35% of the population). There were 18 (or about 1.57% of the population) who were Islamic. 5 (or about 0.44% of the population) belonged to no church, are agnostic or atheist, and 32 individuals (or about 2.79% of the population) did not answer the question.

== Education ==
In Stalden about 398 or (34.6%) of the population have completed non-mandatory upper secondary education, and 65 or (5.7%) have completed additional higher education (either university or a Fachhochschule). Of the 65 who completed tertiary schooling, 87.7% were Swiss men, 7.7% were Swiss women.

During the 2010-2011 school year there were a total of 174 students in the Stalden (VS) school system. The education system in the Canton of Valais allows young children to attend one year of non-obligatory Kindergarten. During that school year, there was one kindergarten class (KG1 or KG2) and 12 kindergarten students. The canton's school system requires students to attend six years of primary school. In Stalden (VS) there were a total of 4 classes and 72 students in the primary school. The secondary school program consists of three lower, obligatory years of schooling (orientation classes), followed by three to five years of optional, advanced schools. There were 102 lower secondary students who attended school in Stalden (VS). All the upper secondary students attended school in another municipality.

As of 2000, there were 75 students in Stalden who came from another municipality, while 40 residents attended schools outside the municipality.
