= Gampel-Bratsch =

- Municipality
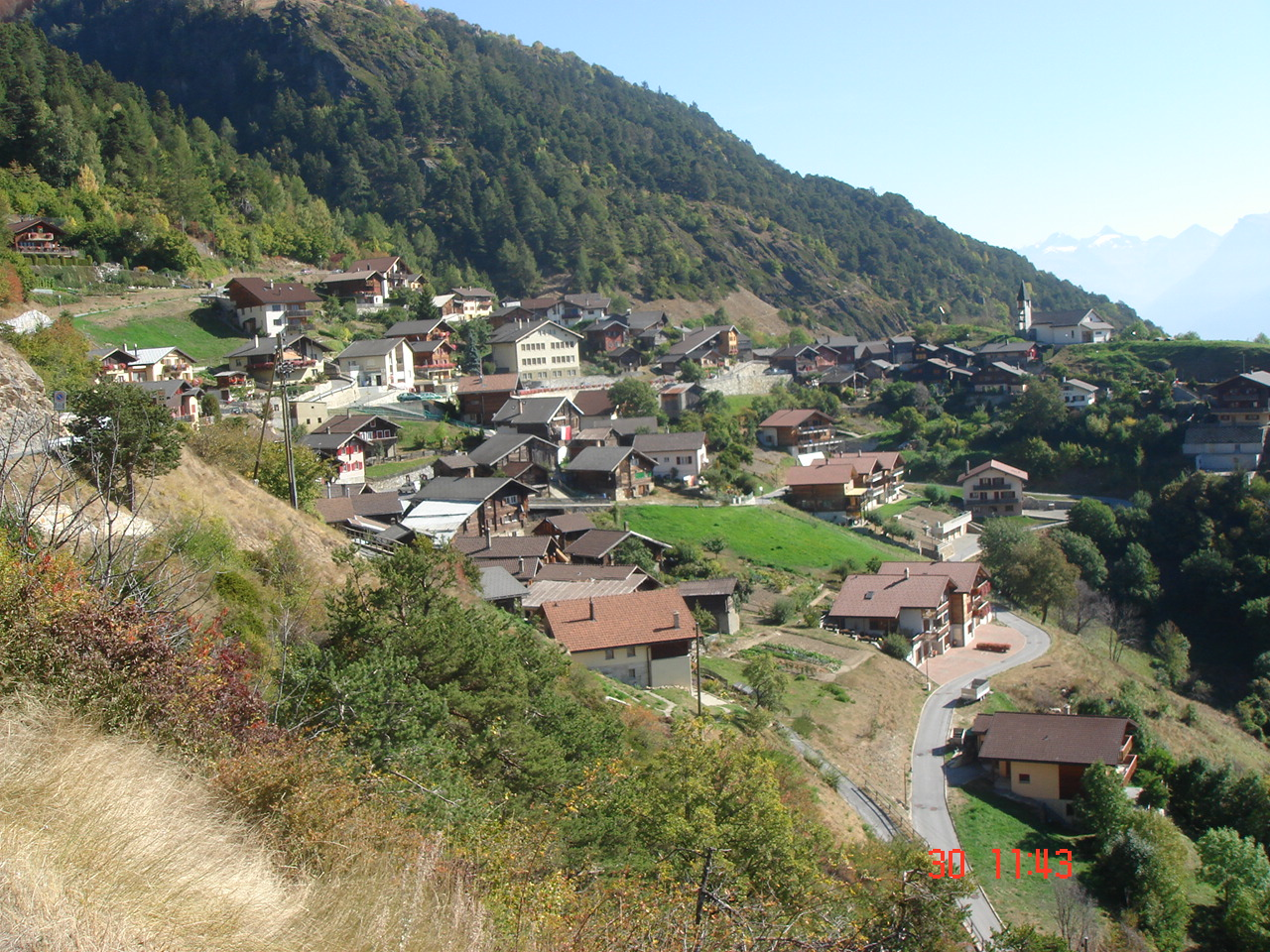

- Flag Coat of arms
- Location of Gampel-Bratsch
- Location within Switzerland Location within Canton of Valais
- Coordinates: 46°19′N 7°45′E
- Country: Switzerland
- Canton: Valais
- District: Leuk

Government
  - Mayor: Konrad Martig

Area
  - Total: 23.1 km^{2} (8.9 sq mi)
- Elevation: 634 m (2,080 ft)

Population (December 2007)
  - Total: 1,849
  - Density: 80.0/km^{2} (207/sq mi)
- Time zone: UTC+01:00 (CET)
  - Summer (DST): UTC+02:00 (CEST)
- Postal code: 3945
- SFOS number: 6118
- ISO 3166 code: CH-VS
- Localities: Bratsch, Gampel
- Surrounded by: Erschmatt, Ferden, Niedergesteln, Steg, Turtmann, Leuk
- Website: www.gampel-bratsch.ch

Gampel-Bratsch is a municipality in the district of Leuk in the canton of Valais in Switzerland. It was formed on January 1, 2009. The voters of the municipalities of Gampel and Bratsch decided to merge on January 20, 2008.

== History ==
Bratsch is first mentioned in 1228 and 1242 as Praes. In 1309 it was mentioned as Prahcs, in 1322 as Praes, in 1357 as Prayes, in 1408 as Prages and in 1532 as Bratsch. Gampel is first mentioned in 1238 as Champilz.

== Geography ==
Aerial view (1955)

Gampel-Bratsch has an area, as of 2011, of 23.1 square kilometers (8.9 mi^{2}). Of this area, 30.6% is used for agricultural purposes, while 38.0% is forested. Of the rest of the land, 3.5% is settled (buildings or roads) and 28.0% is unproductive land.

== Demographics ==
Gampel-Bratsch has a population (as of December 2020) of 1,997. As of 2008, 10.7% of the population are resident foreign nationals. Over the last 10 years (1999–2009 ) the population has changed at a rate of -1.5%. It has changed at a rate of 1.4% due to migration and at a rate of 0.3% due to births and deaths.

Most of the population (as of 2000) speaks German (93.4%) as their first language, Albanian is the second most common (1.9%) and Serbo-Croatian is the third (1.4%).

As of 2008, the gender distribution of the population was 49.6% male and 50.4% female. The population was made up of 810 Swiss men (43.6% of the population) and 111 (6.0%) non-Swiss men. There were 850 Swiss women (45.7%) and 87 (4.7%) non-Swiss women.

The age distribution of the population (as of 2000) is children and teenagers (0–19 years old) make up 24.1% of the population, while adults (20–64 years old) make up 60.7% and seniors (over 64 years old) make up 15.2%.

As of 2009, the construction rate of new housing units was 3.8 new units per 1000 residents. The vacancy rate for the municipality, in 2010, was 0.29%.

== Historic Population ==
The historical population is given in the following chart:

== Economy ==
As of 2010, Gampel-Bratsch had an unemployment rate of 1.9%. As of 2008, there were 91 people employed in the primary economic sector and about 41 businesses involved in this sector. 210 people were employed in the secondary sector and there were 23 businesses in this sector. 271 people were employed in the tertiary sector, with 69 businesses in this sector. There were residents of the municipality who were employed in some capacity. In 2000, there were workers who commuted away from the municipality.

Of the working population, 22.7% used public transportation to get to work, and 49.9% used a private car.
