= Albinen =

- Municipality
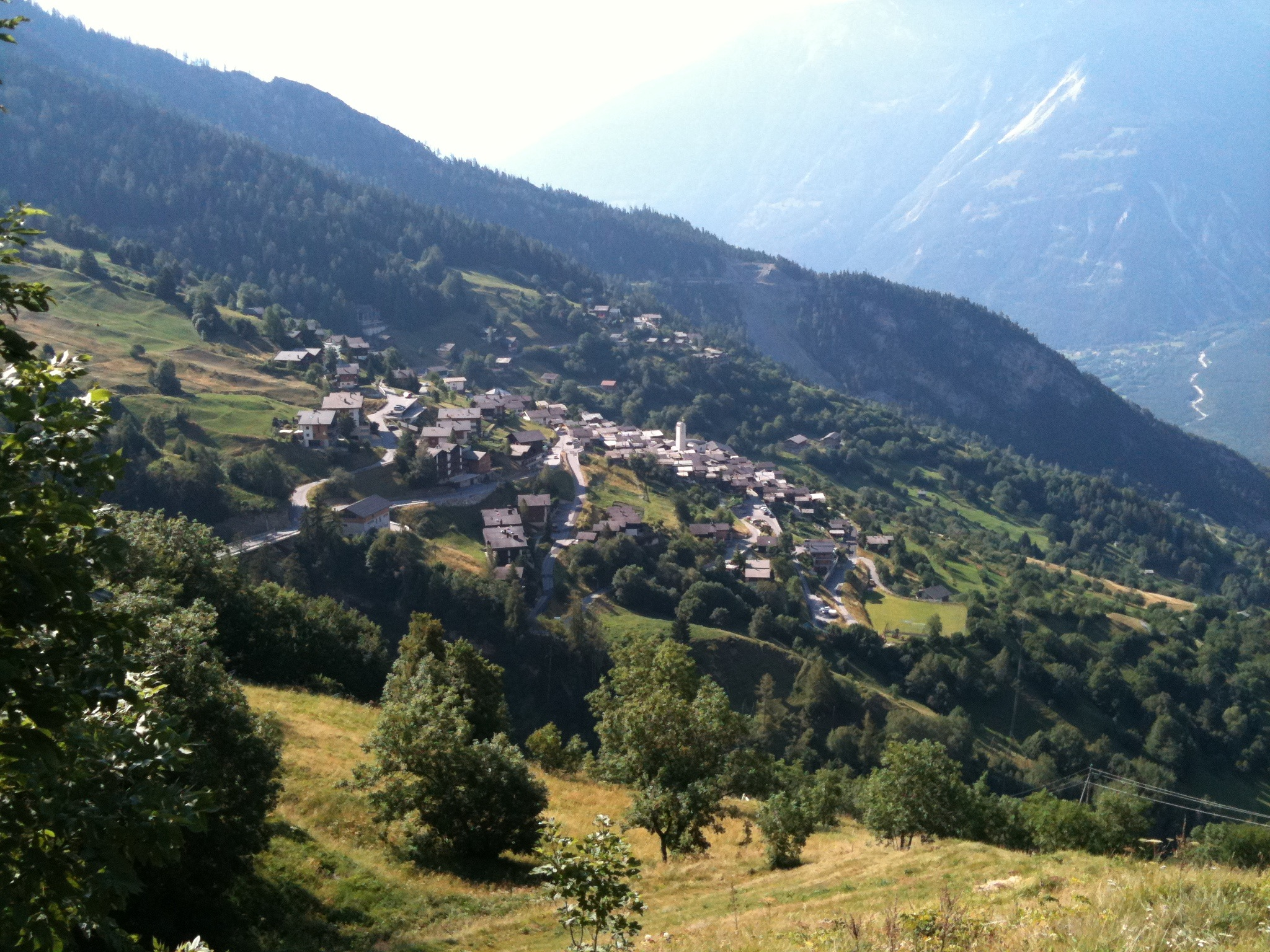
- Albinen village

- Flag Coat of arms
- Location of Albinen
- Location within Switzerland Location within Canton of Valais
- Coordinates: 46°20′N 7°38′E
- Country: Switzerland
- Canton: Valais
- District: Leuk

Government
  - Mayor: Bernhard Grand

Area
  - Total: 15.5 km^{2} (6.0 sq mi)
- Elevation: 1,300 m (4,300 ft)

Population (December 2002)
  - Total: 266
  - Density: 17.2/km^{2} (44.4/sq mi)
- Time zone: UTC+01:00 (CET)
  - Summer (DST): UTC+02:00 (CEST)
- Postal code: 3955
- SFOS number: 6102
- ISO 3166 code: CH-VS
- Surrounded by: Guttet-Feschel, Inden, Leuk, Leukerbad
- Website: albinen.ch

Albinen is a municipality in the district of Leuk in the canton of Valais in Switzerland.

== History ==
Albinen is first mentioned in 1224 as Albignun. Later, it was known as Albinnon or by its French name Arbignon.

== Geography ==
Albinen has an area, as of 2009, of 15.5 square kilometers (6.0 mi^{2}). Of this area, 7.19 km^{2} (2.78 mi^{2}) or 46.4% is used for agricultural purposes, while 6.11 km^{2} (2.36 mi^{2}) or 39.5% is forested. Of the rest of the land, 0.52 km^{2} (0.20 mi^{2}) or 3.4% is settled (buildings or roads), 0.05 km^{2} (12 acres) or 0.3% is either rivers or lakes and 1.66 km^{2} (0.64 mi^{2}) or 10.7% is unproductive land.

Of the built up area, housing and buildings made up 1.2% and transportation infrastructure made up 1.9%. Out of the forested land, 34.5% of the total land area is heavily forested and 4.9% is covered with orchards or small clusters of trees. Of the agricultural land, 0.1% is used for growing crops and 3.3% is pastures and 43.0% is used for alpine pastures. All the water in the municipality is flowing water. Of the unproductive areas, 3.7% is unproductive vegetation and 7.0% is too rocky for vegetation.

The municipality is located in the Leuk district. It consists of the village of Albinen, the alpine pasture settlements of Chermignon and Torrent along with the former herding camp (now vacation villages) of Ober Dorbu and Tschingere. These towns were established back in the days when the farmers of Albinen lived a semi-nomadic life.

Albinen is situated in the south of Switzerland in the Swiss Alps at 1,275 m (4,183 ft) above sea level. The town is on a sunny, south-facing slope between two creeks.

The territory of Albinen reaches from the river "Dala" at 760 m (2,490 ft) above sea level to the Torrenthorn at 2,997 m (9,833 ft) above sea level.

== Flora and fauna ==
The flora changes with the different altitudes of the territory. The lower areas are dominated by woods and meadows. The countryside changes to mountain meadows, rocks and cliffs at the higher altitudes. A large variety of wild flowers can be found, especially during spring and in the early summer when most of them flourish. In autumn the larch trees turn yellow and bushes appear at all kinds of red, orange and yellow colouring.

Albinen is home to many bird species as well as to local wildlife such as deer, chamois buck, fox, lux and steinbock.

== Coat of arms ==
The blazon of the municipal coat of arms is Argent, issuant from Coupeaux vert a Latin cross sable.

== Demographics ==
Albinen has a population (as of December 2020) of 243. As of 2008, 6.8% of the population are resident foreign nationals. Over the last 10 years (1999–2009 ) the population has changed at a rate of 2.1%. It has changed at a rate of 9.6% due to migration and at a rate of -6.4% due to births and deaths.

Most of the population (as of 2000) speaks German (255 or 97.7%) as their first language, French is the second most common (2 or 0.8%) and Romansh is the third (1 or 0.4%).

As of 2008, the gender distribution of the population was 48.1% male and 51.9% female. The population was made up of 124 Swiss men (43.2% of the population) and 14 (4.9%) non-Swiss men. There were 139 Swiss women (48.4%) and 10 (3.5%) non-Swiss women. Of the population in the municipality 155 or about 59.4% were born in Albinen and lived there in 2000. There were 40 or 15.3% who were born in the same canton, while 33 or 12.6% were born somewhere else in Switzerland, and 24 or 9.2% were born outside of Switzerland.

The age distribution of the population (as of 2000) is children and teenagers (0–19 years old) make up 23.4% of the population, while adults (20–64 years old) make up 51.7% and seniors (over 64 years old) make up 24.9%.

As of 2000, there were 106 people who were single and never married in the municipality. There were 130 married individuals, 17 widows or widowers and 8 individuals who are divorced.

As of 2000, there were 107 private households in the municipality, and an average of 2.3 persons per household. There were 35 households that consist of only one person and 9 households with five or more people. Out of a total of 114 households that answered this question, 30.7% were households made up of just one person and there were 3 adults who lived with their parents. Of the rest of the households, there are 31 married couples without children, 34 married couples with children There were 3 single parents with a child or children. There was 1 household that was made up of unrelated people and 7 households that were made up of some sort of institution or another collective housing.

In 2000 there were 121 single family homes (or 64.4% of the total) out of a total of 188 inhabited buildings. There were 46 multi-family buildings (24.5%), along with 6 multi-purpose buildings that were mostly used for housing (3.2%) and 15 other use buildings (commercial or industrial) that also had some housing (8.0%).

In 2000, a total of 104 apartments (33.4% of the total) were permanently occupied, while 167 apartments (53.7%) were seasonally occupied and 40 apartments (12.9%) were empty. The vacancy rate for the municipality, in 2010, was 0.93%.

The historical population is given in the following chart:

== Sights ==
The entire village of Albinen is designated as part of the Inventory of Swiss Heritage Sites.

== Tourism ==
The local business is mainly dependent on tourism. Albinen benefits from its calm and sunny location but, being situated in the middle of the tourist region Valais, still offers good connections to some of the most famous locations in the Swiss Alps (Zermatt, Saas-Fee, Montana, Verbier) and the alpine resort Leukerbad.

A regular bus service connects the town with the local main town Leuk (located 20 minutes away and providing access to the Swiss Train Network) and the alpine resort Leukerbad (15 minutes away) with its hot water pools.

Albinen Tourism maintains an extensive hiking network that offers trails of different length and difficulty. A tourism highlight is the "Albinenleitern": a series of ladders climbing a cliff, formerly providing the main connection between Albinen and Leukerbad.

A cable car connects to the ski station Rinderhütte situated in the mountain area Torrent at 2313 meters above sea level. In winter it is a paradise for skiers, providing over 50 km of slopes. In summer Torrent offers a large network of hiking and mountain bike trails. The panoramic views of the 4,000 m (13,000 ft) peaks of the Swiss, French and Italian Alps from the Torrent area are breathtaking.

== Old town ==
Historic aerial photograph by Werner Friedli from 1955

Albinen is well known for being one of the best-preserved traditional Swiss mountain villages. Narrow stone alleys run between old larch houses. Many of these homes and sheds are several hundred years old and demonstrate the craft of former generations.

After an earthquake has damaged the old church of Albinen, the church has been replaced by a relatively modern building. The church building is one of the landmarks of Albinen and it matches well the architecture of the old town.

== Politics ==
In the 2007 federal election the most popular party was the CVP which received 70.93% of the vote. The next three most popular parties were the SVP (18.08%), the SP (8.49%) and the FDP (1.3%). In the federal election, a total of 146 votes were cast, and the voter turnout was 67.0%.

In the 2009 Conseil d'État/Staatsrat election a total of 150 votes were cast, of which 2 or about 1.3% were invalid. The voter participation was 68.8%, which is much more than the cantonal average of 54.67%. In the 2007 Swiss Council of States election a total of 145 votes were cast, of which 2 or about 1.4% were invalid. The voter participation was 67.1%, which is much more than the cantonal average of 59.88%.

== Economy ==
As of 2010, Albinen had an unemployment rate of 1.8%. As of 2008, there were 16 people employed in the primary economic sector and about 8 businesses involved in this sector. 11 people were employed in the secondary sector and there were 2 businesses in this sector. 48 people were employed in the tertiary sector, with 11 businesses in this sector. There were 114 residents of the municipality who were employed in some capacity, of which females made up 39.5% of the workforce.

In 2008 the total number of full-time equivalent jobs was 55. The number of jobs in the primary sector was 7, all of which were in agriculture. The number of jobs in the secondary sector was 10, all of which were in construction. The number of jobs in the tertiary sector was 38. In the tertiary sector; 2 or 5.3% were in wholesale or retail sales or the repair of motor vehicles, 30 or 78.9% were in a hotel or restaurant, 2 or 5.3% were in education.

In 2000, there were 13 workers who commuted into the municipality and 68 workers who commuted away. The municipality is a net exporter of workers, with about 5.2 workers leaving the municipality for every one entering. Of the working population, 14.9% used public transportation to get to work, and 51.8% used a private car.

== Religion ==
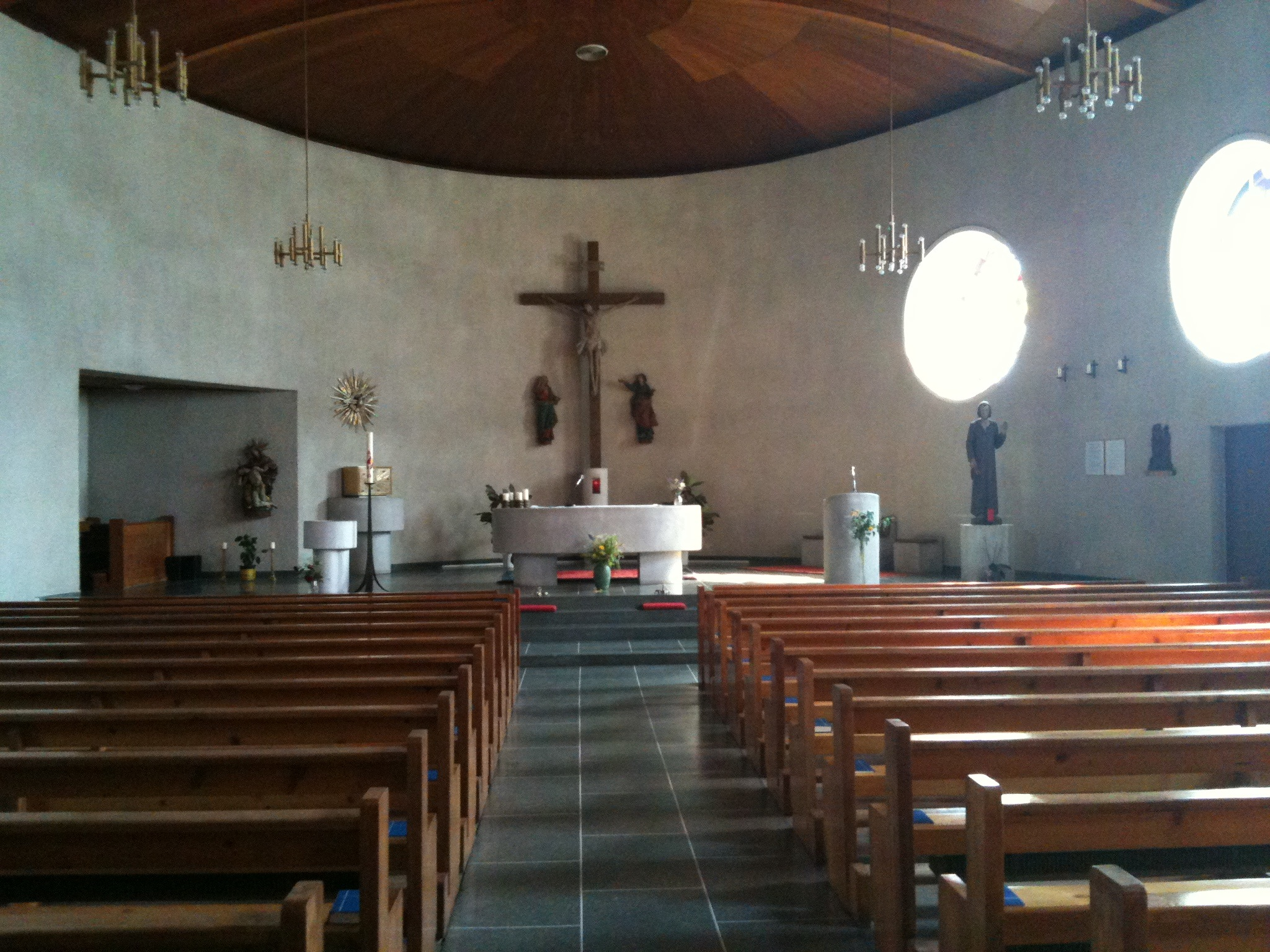
Interior of the Albinen village church

From the 2000 census, 220 or 84.3% were Roman Catholic, while 28 or 10.7% belonged to the Swiss Reformed Church. 8 (or about 3.07% of the population) belonged to no church, are agnostic or atheist, and 5 individuals (or about 1.92% of the population) did not answer the question.

== Education ==
In Albinen about 80 or (30.7%) of the population have completed non-mandatory upper secondary education, and 19 or (7.3%) have completed additional higher education (either university or a Fachhochschule). Of the 19 who completed tertiary schooling, 47.4% were Swiss men, 15.8% were Swiss women.

As of 2000, there were 13 students from Albinen who attended schools outside the municipality.
