= Majinghorn =

Mountain in Switzerland

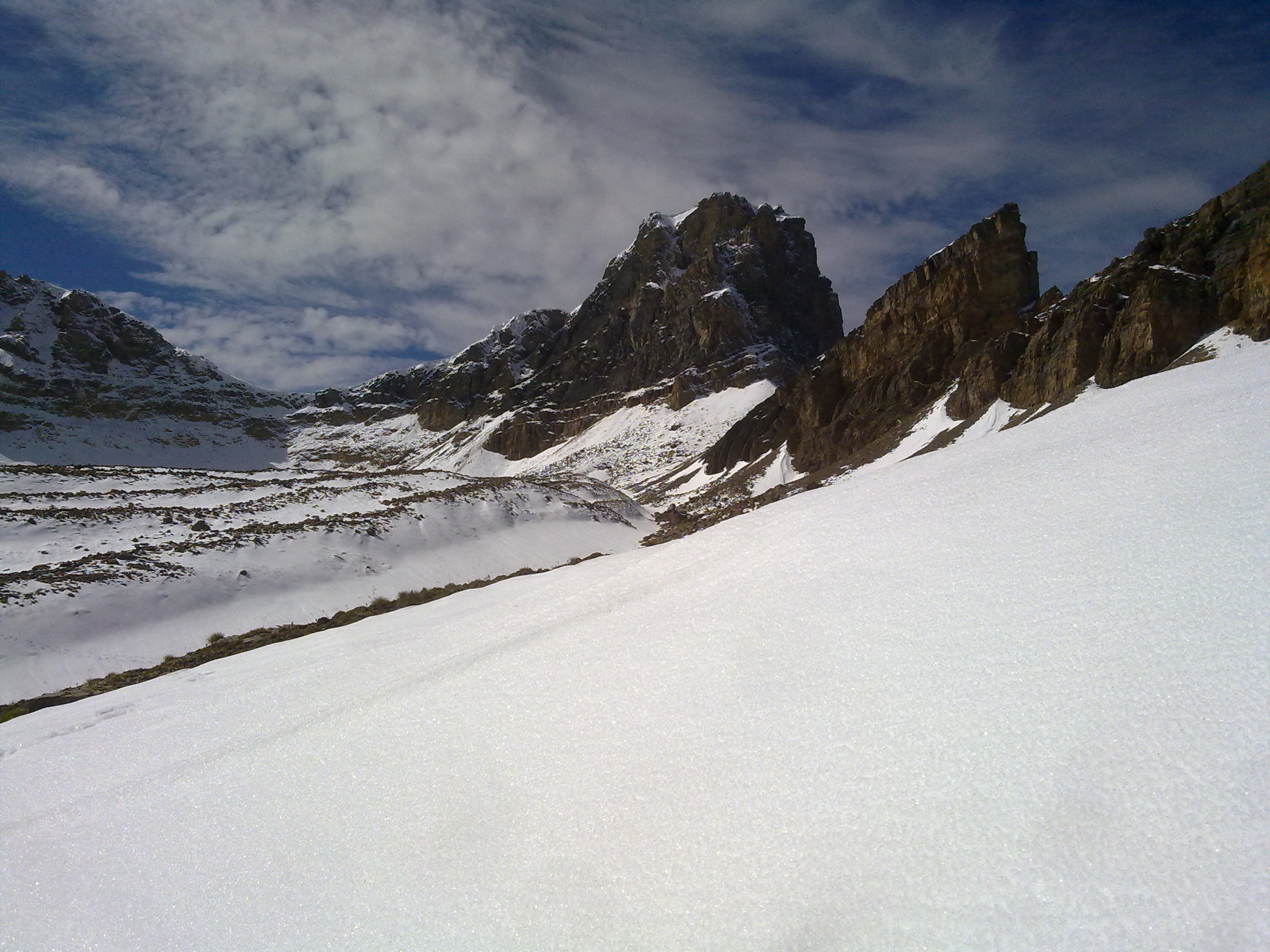
- View from Ferdenpass (east side)

Highest point
- Elevation: 3,053 m (10,016 ft)
- Prominence: 231 m (758 ft)
- Parent peak: Balmhorn
- Coordinates: 46°23′27.7″N 7°41′20.8″E

Geography
- Location within Switzerland
- Location: Valais, Switzerland
- Parent range: Bernese Alps

The Majinghorn is a mountain of the Bernese Alps, located east of Leukerbad in the canton of Valais. It lies between the Ferdenrothorn and the Torrenthorn, on the chain that separates the valley of Leukerbad from the Lötschental.
