= Erschmatt =

- Former municipality
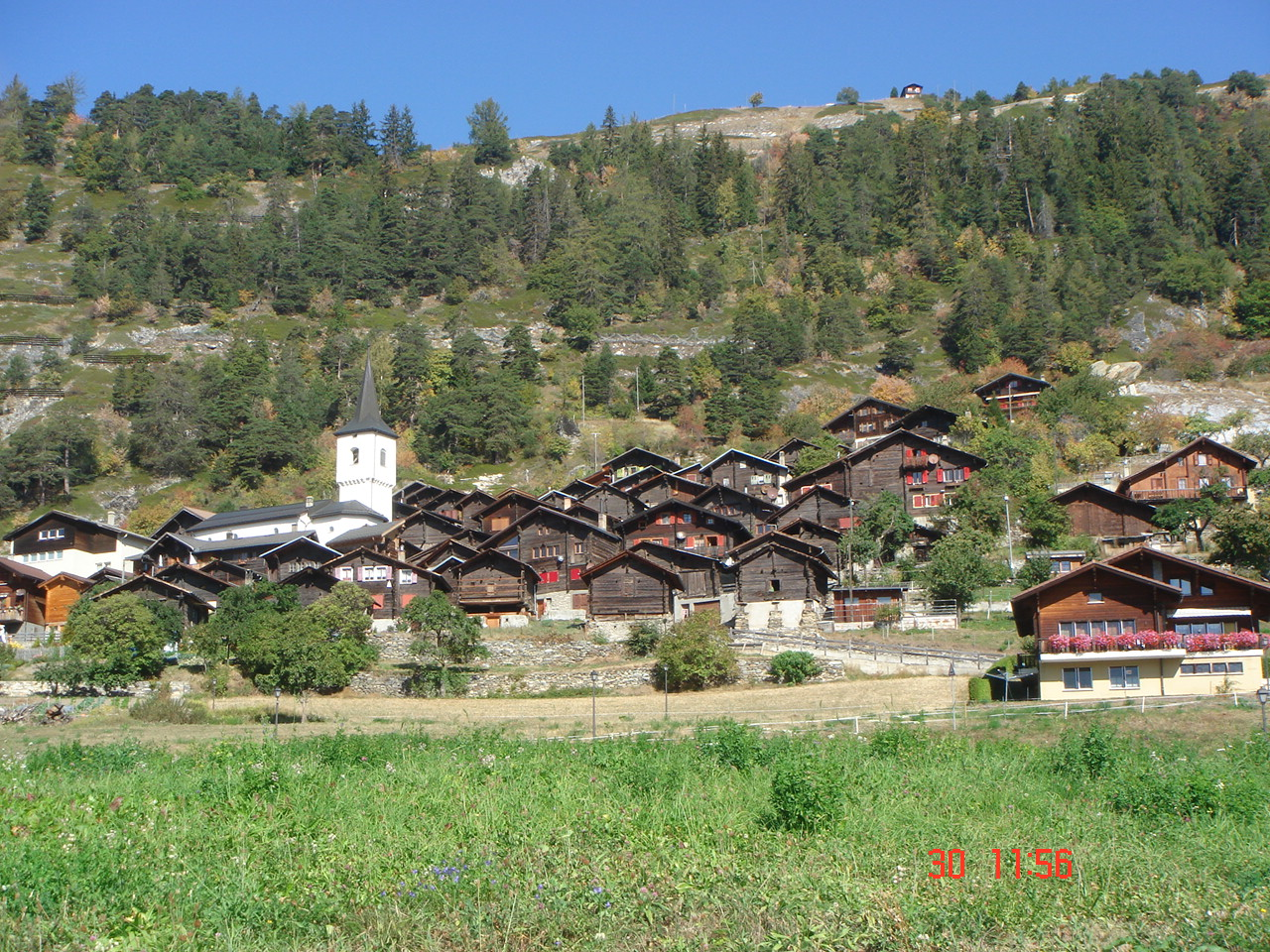
- Erschmatt village

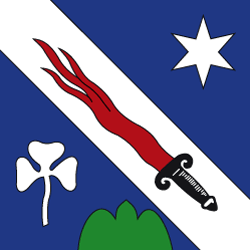
- Flag
- Location of Erschmatt
- Location within Switzerland Location within Canton of Valais
- Coordinates: 46°19′N 7°41′E
- Country: Switzerland
- Canton: Valais
- District: Leuk

Government
  - Mayor: Rafael Locher

Area
  - Total: 11.2 km^{2} (4.3 sq mi)
- Elevation: 1,228 m (4,029 ft)

Population (2010)
  - Total: 278
  - Density: 24.8/km^{2} (64.3/sq mi)
- Time zone: UTC+01:00 (CET)
  - Summer (DST): UTC+02:00 (CEST)
- Postal code: 3957
- SFOS number: 6105
- ISO 3166 code: CH-VS
- Surrounded by: Bratsch, Ferden, Gampel, Guttet-Feschel, Leuk
- Website: www.erschmatt.ch

Erschmatt (Swiss Standard German pronunciation: [ˈɛrʃmat]) is a former municipality in the district of Leuk in the canton of Valais in Switzerland. On 1 January 2013 the former municipality of Erschmatt merged into the municipality of Leuk.

== History ==
Erschmatt is first mentioned in 1328 as Huers. In 1357 it was mentioned as Hoers.

== Geography ==
Before the merger, Erschmatt had a total area of 11.2 km^{2} (4.3 mi^{2}). Of this area, 37.0% is used for agricultural purposes, while 22.8% is forested. Of the rest of the land, 1.9% is settled (buildings or roads) and 38.4% is unproductive land.

The former municipality is located in the Leuk district, at an elevation of 1,230 m (4,040 ft) on the Leuker Sonnenbergen mountain. It consists of the village of Erschmatt and the, usually occupied year round, alpine herding settlement of Brentschen at an elevation of 1,540 m (5,050 ft).

== Coat of arms ==
The blazon of the municipal coat of arms is Azure between a Mullet of Six and a Trefoil Argent on a Bend of the same a Sword of Flames Gules hilted Sable in base Coupeaux Vert.

== Demographics ==
Erschmatt had a population (as of 2010) of 278. As of 2008, 1.0% of the population are resident foreign nationals. Over the last 10 years (1999–2009 ) the population has changed at a rate of -9%. It has changed at a rate of -2.2% due to migration and at a rate of -4.7% due to births and deaths.

Most of the population (as of 2000) spoke German (299 or 99.0%) as their first language, French and Romansh are the next most common (1 or 0.3% each).

As of 2008, the gender distribution of the population was 51.9% male and 48.1% female. The population was made up of 145 Swiss men (49.5% of the population) and 7 (2.4%) non-Swiss men. There were 140 Swiss women (47.8%) and 1 (0.3%) non-Swiss women. Of the population in the municipality 198 or about 65.6% were born in Erschmatt and lived there in 2000. There were 75 or 24.8% who were born in the same canton, while 14 or 4.6% were born somewhere else in Switzerland, and 5 or 1.7% were born outside of Switzerland.

The age distribution of the population (as of 2000) is children and teenagers (0–19 years old) make up 24.5% of the population, while adults (20–64 years old) make up 53.6% and seniors (over 64 years old) make up 21.9%.

As of 2000, there were 125 people who were single and never married in the municipality. There were 154 married individuals, 18 widows or widowers and 5 individuals who are divorced.

As of 2000, there were 114 private households in the municipality, and an average of 2.6 persons per household. There were 31 households that consist of only one person and 10 households with five or more people. Out of a total of 116 households that answered this question, 26.7% were households made up of just one person and there was 1 adult who lived with their parents. Of the rest of the households, there are 28 married couples without children, 48 married couples with children There were 2 single parents with a child or children. There were 4 households that were made up of unrelated people and 2 households that were made up of some sort of institution or another collective housing.

In 2000 there were 105 single family homes (or 67.3% of the total) out of a total of 156 inhabited buildings. There were 30 multi-family buildings (19.2%), along with 15 multi-purpose buildings that were mostly used for housing (9.6%) and 6 other use buildings (commercial or industrial) that also had some housing (3.8%).

In 2000, a total of 113 apartments (58.9% of the total) were permanently occupied, while 63 apartments (32.8%) were seasonally occupied and 16 apartments (8.3%) were empty. The vacancy rate for the municipality, in 2010, was 2.59%.

The historical population is given in the following chart:

== Sights ==
The entire village of Erschmatt is designated as part of the Inventory of Swiss Heritage Sites. In 2013 Herbert Lötscher built the world's first residential Heliodom or sun house concept. The house is designed so that during the winter the large windows allow the sun to heat the entire building, while in the summer they are shaded and cooled. The design allows the Heliodom to consume up to 80% less energy than a comparable standard home.

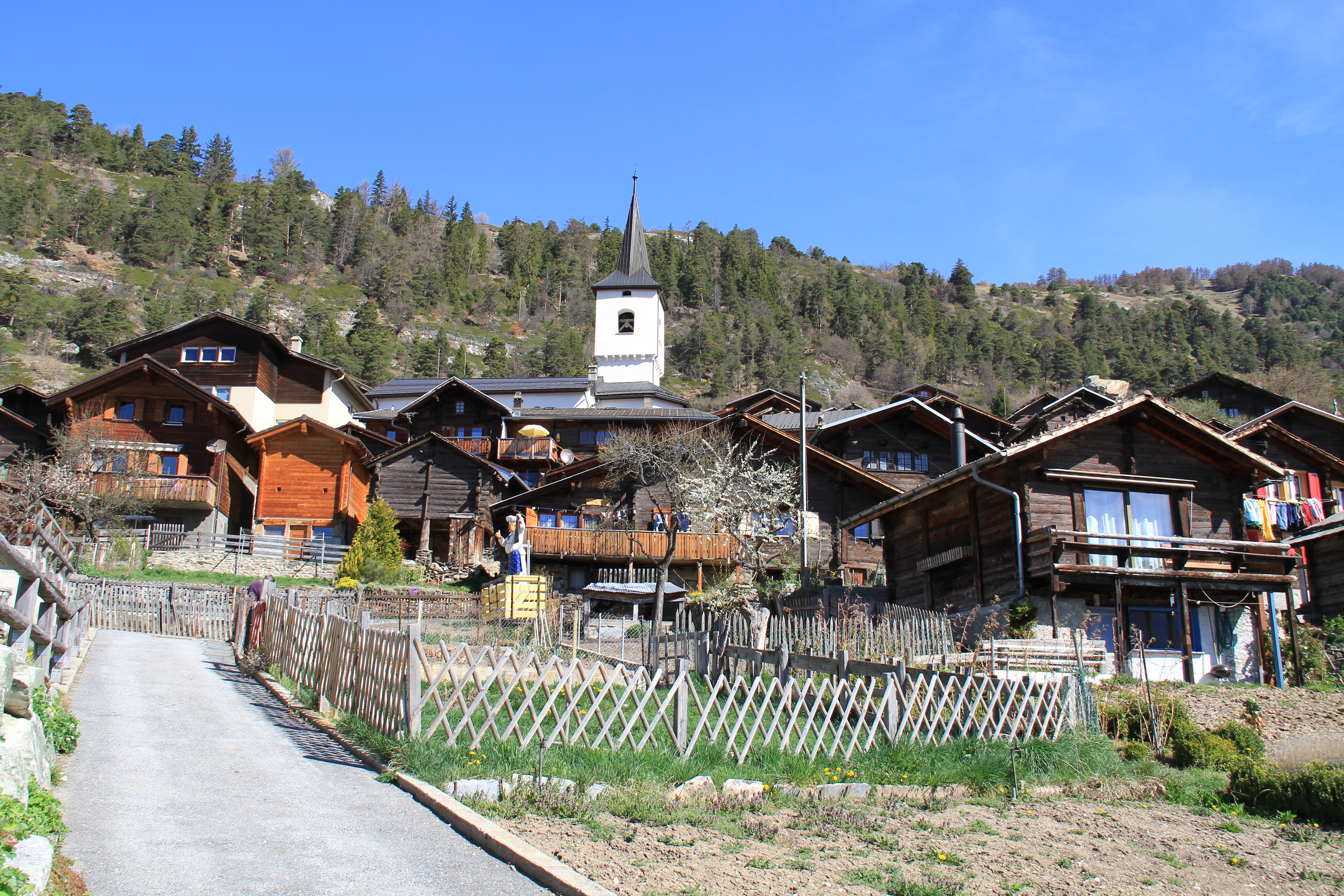
Erschmatt

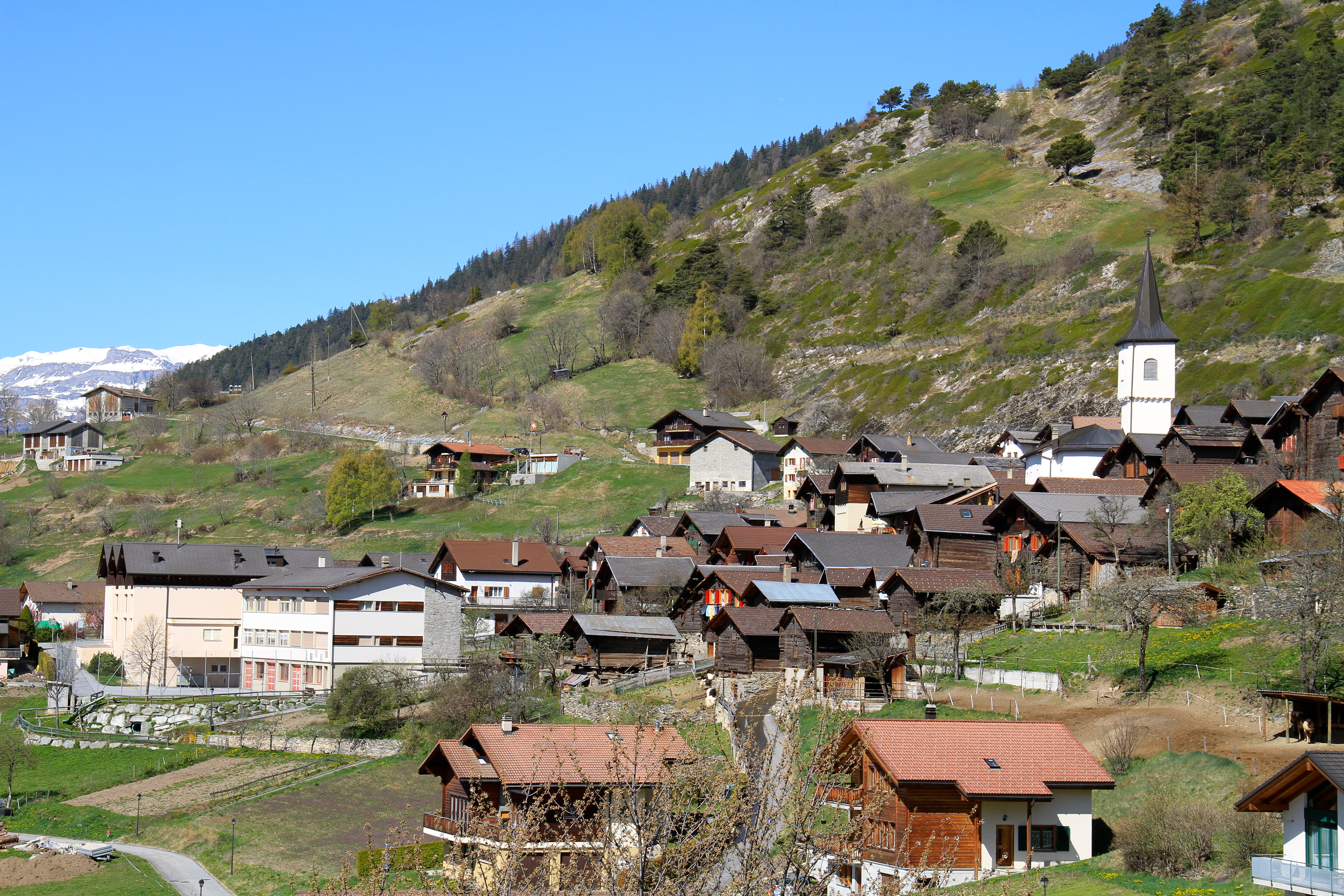
Erschmatt

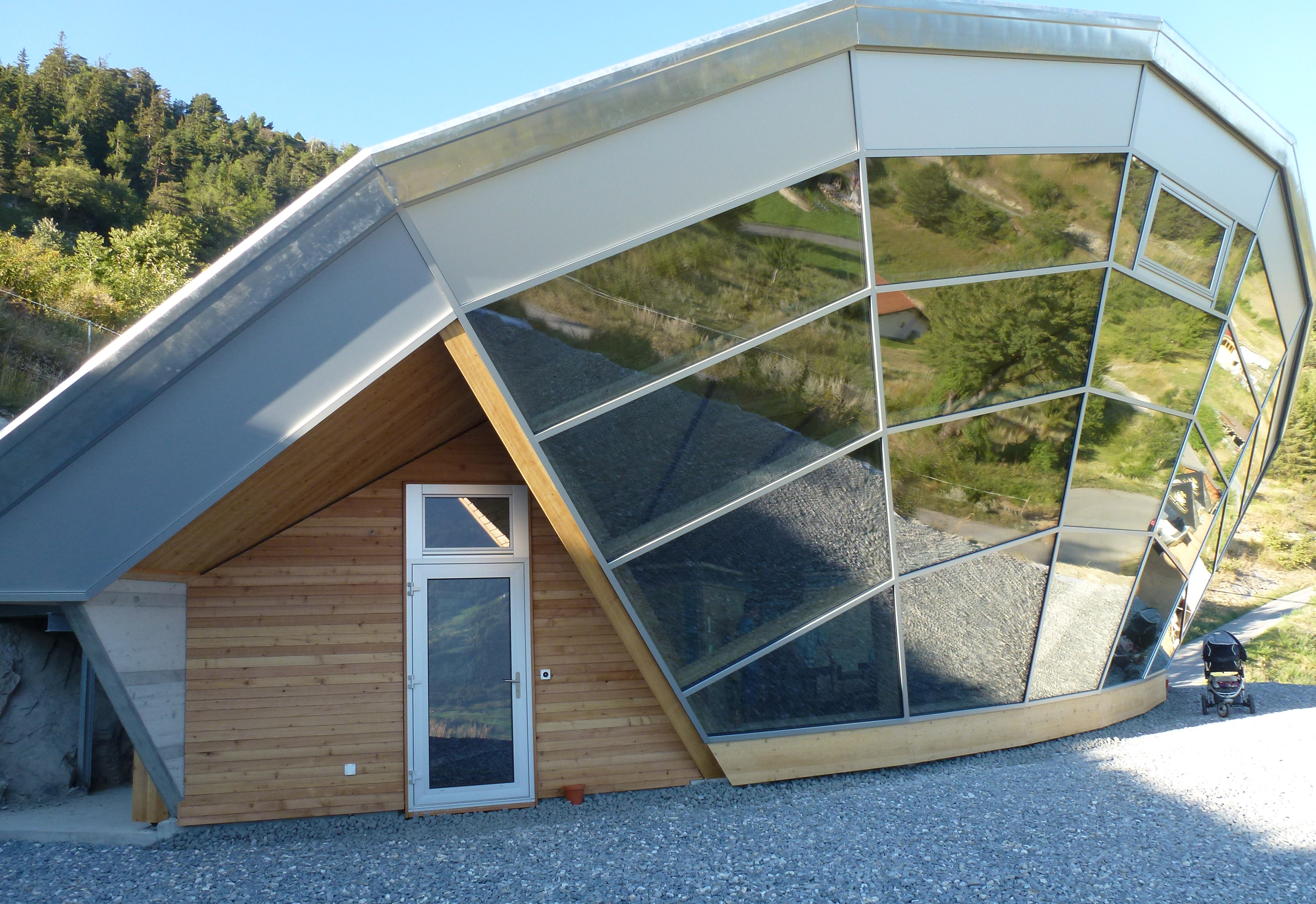
Heliodom Erschmatt, 04.09.2013

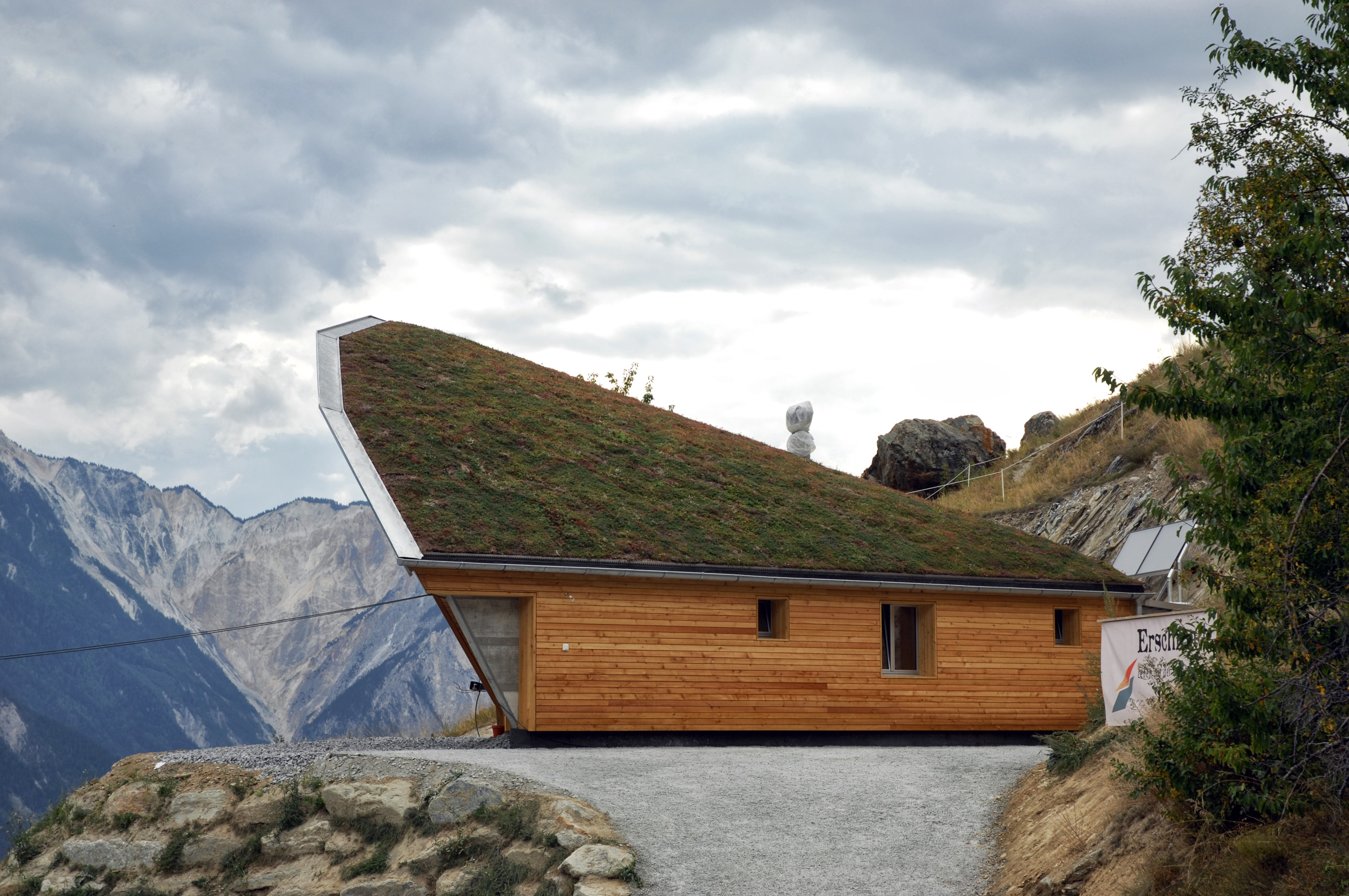
Heliodom Erschmatt, 07.09.2013

== Politics ==
In the 2007 federal election the most popular party was the CVP which received 59.46% of the vote. The next three most popular parties were the SP (27.69%), the SVP (11.12%) and the FDP (1.29%). In the federal election, a total of 200 votes were cast, and the voter turnout was 80.6%.

In the 2009 Conseil d'État/Staatsrat election a total of 193 votes were cast, of which 14 or about 7.3% were invalid. The voter participation was 78.8%, which is much more than the cantonal average of 54.67%. In the 2007 Swiss Council of States election a total of 199 votes were cast, of which 6 or about 3.0% were invalid. The voter participation was 81.6%, which is much more than the cantonal average of 59.88%.

== Economy ==
As of 2010, Erschmatt had an unemployment rate of 1.2%. As of 2008, there were 26 people employed in the primary economic sector and about 7 businesses involved in this sector. 6 people were employed in the secondary sector and there were 3 businesses in this sector. 20 people were employed in the tertiary sector, with 9 businesses in this sector. There were 141 residents of the municipality who were employed in some capacity, of which females made up 38.3% of the workforce.

In 2008 the total number of full-time equivalent jobs was 34. The number of jobs in the primary sector was 16, of which 5 were in agriculture and 10 were in forestry or lumber production. The number of jobs in the secondary sector was 4 of which 1 was in manufacturing and 2 (50.0%) were in construction. The number of jobs in the tertiary sector was 14. In the tertiary sector; 3 or 21.4% were in wholesale or retail sales or the repair of motor vehicles, 1 was in the movement and storage of goods, 2 or 14.3% were in a hotel or restaurant, 1 was the insurance or financial industry, 2 or 14.3% were technical professionals or scientists, 2 or 14.3% were in education.

In 2000, there were 9 workers who commuted into the municipality and 106 workers who commuted away. The municipality is a net exporter of workers, with about 11.8 workers leaving the municipality for every one entering. Of the working population, 22.7% used public transportation to get to work, and 60.3% used a private car.

== Religion ==
From the 2000 census, 279 or 92.4% were Roman Catholic, while 11 or 3.6% belonged to the Swiss Reformed Church. 5 (or about 1.66% of the population) belonged to no church, are agnostic or atheist, and 7 individuals (or about 2.32% of the population) did not answer the question.

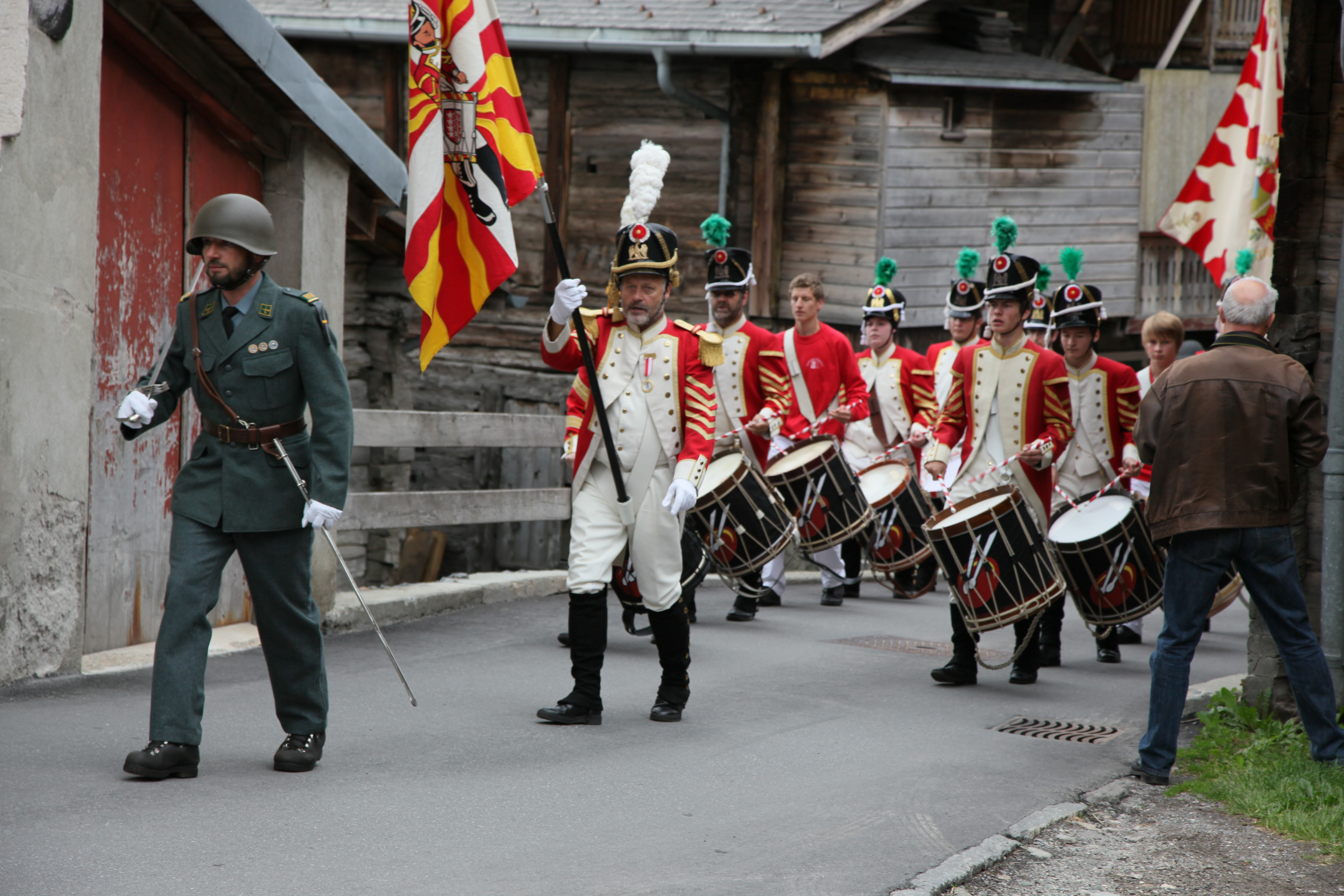
procession "Corpus Christi“ 7.6.2012

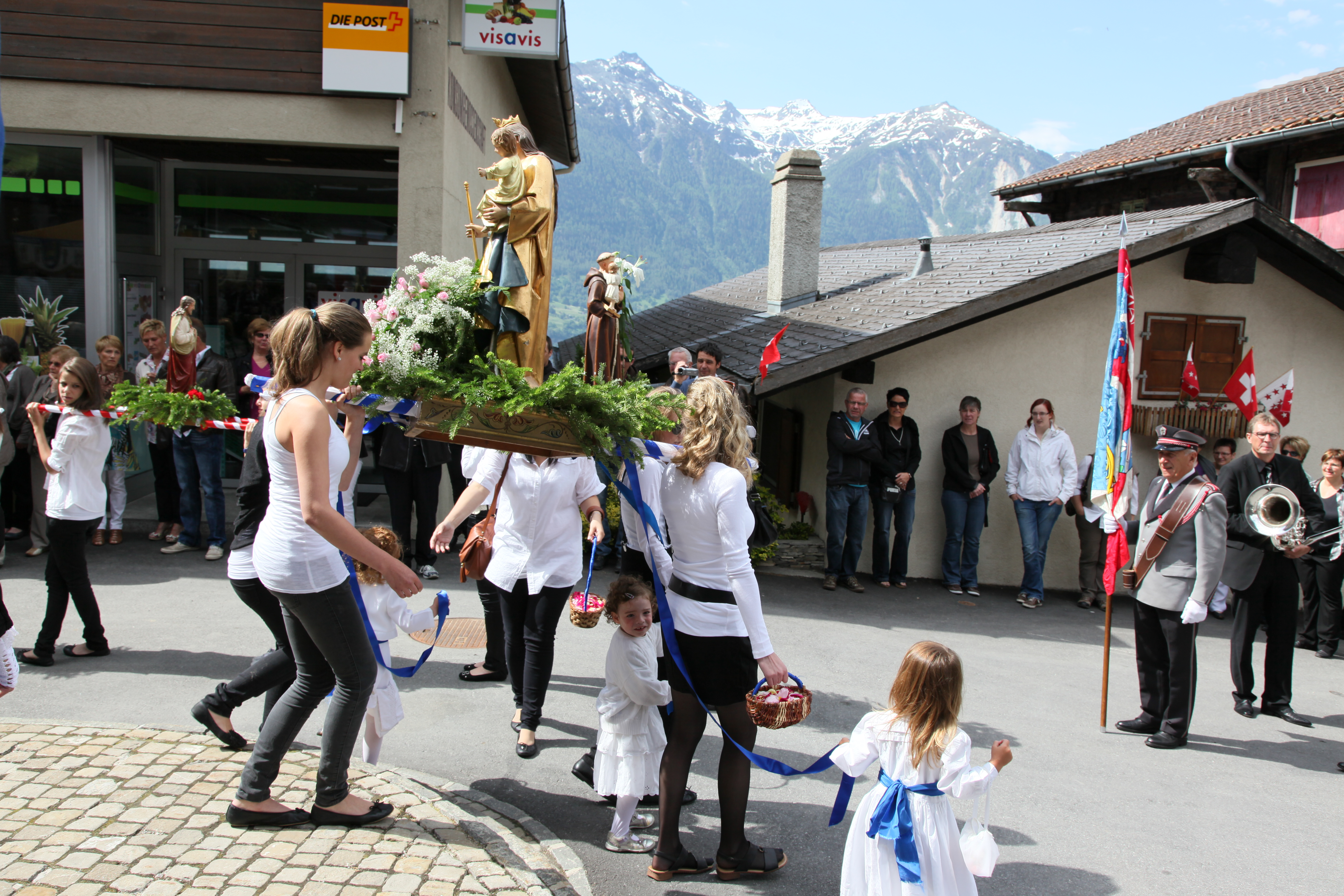
procession "Corpus Christi“ 7.6.2012

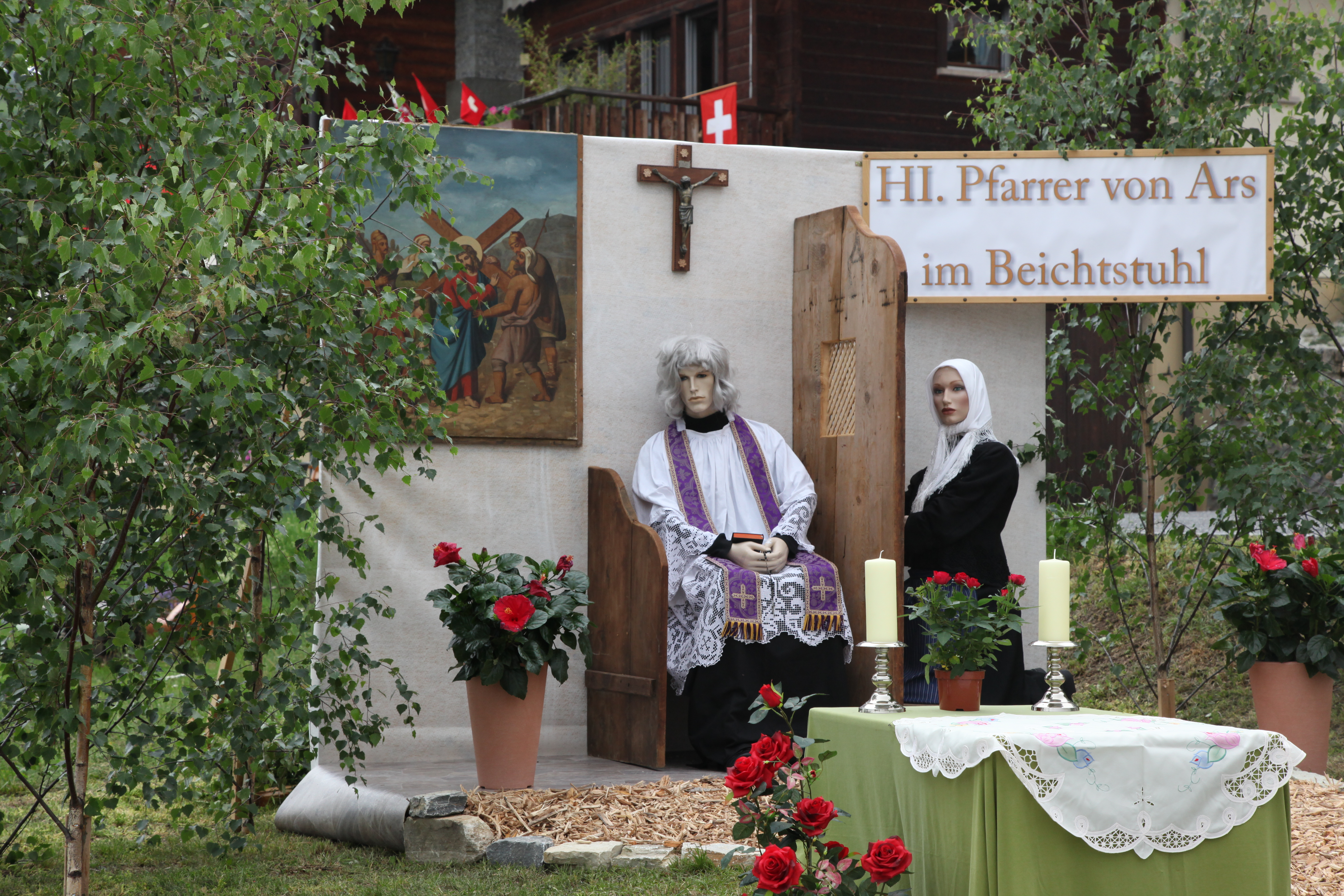
procession "Corpus Christi“ 2011

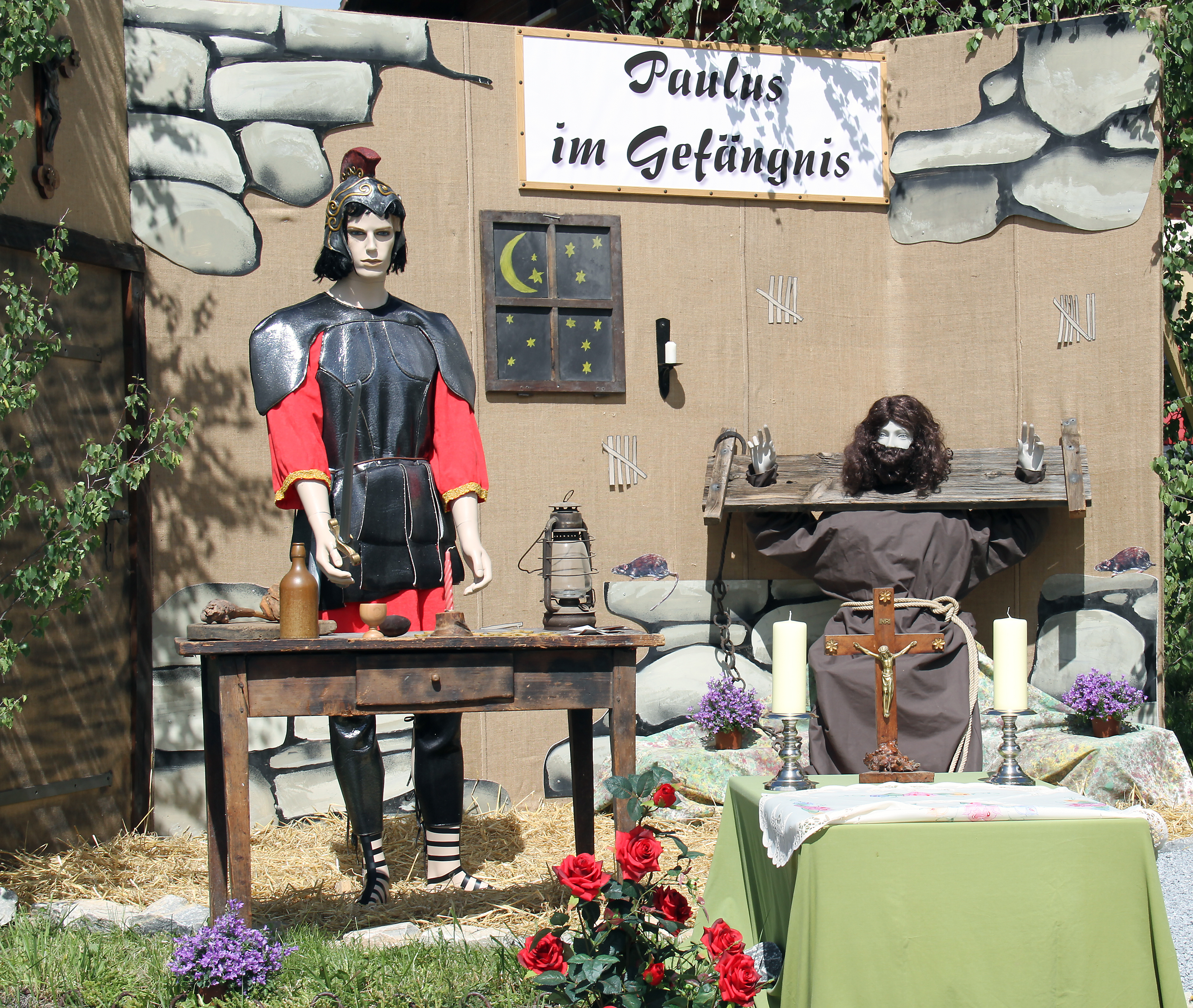
procession "Corpus Christi“ 2010

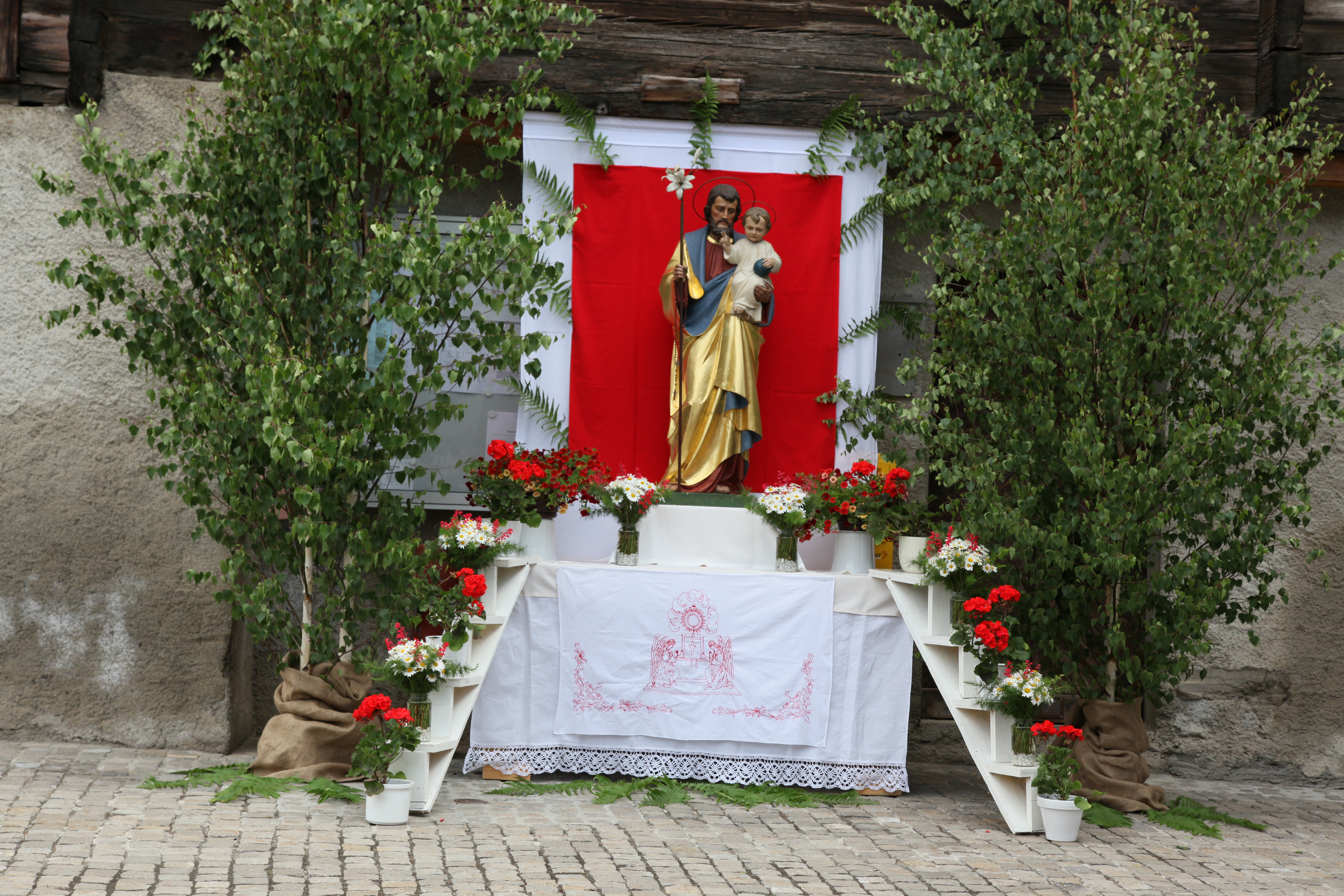
procession "Corpus Christi“ 2012

== Education ==
In Erschmatt about 87 or (28.8%) of the population have completed non-mandatory upper secondary education, and 12 or (4.0%) have completed additional higher education (either university or a Fachhochschule). Of the 12 who completed tertiary schooling, 75.0% were Swiss men, 25.0% were Swiss women.

As of 2000, there were 9 students in Erschmatt who came from another municipality, while 20 residents attended schools outside the municipality.
