= Leuk =

- Municipality
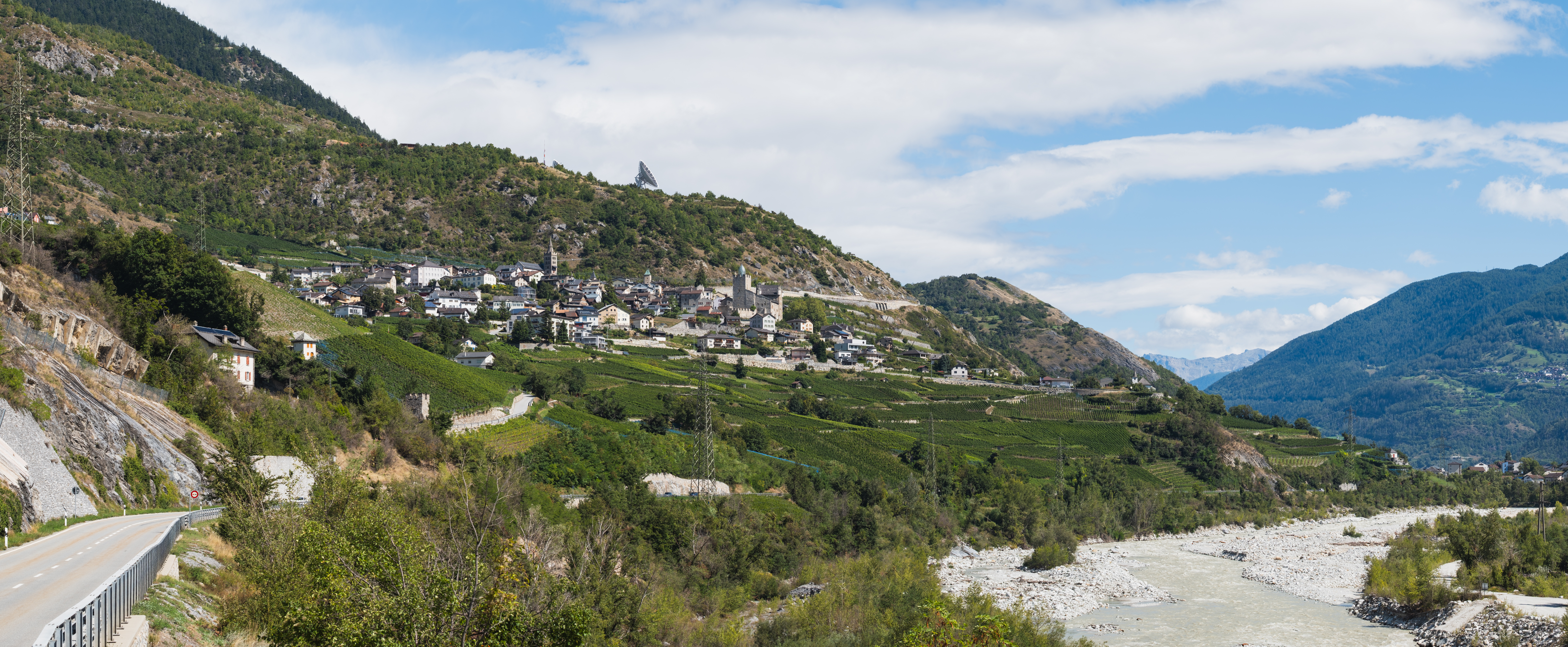

- Flag Coat of arms
- Location of Leuk
- Location within Switzerland Location within Canton of Valais
- Coordinates: 46°19′N 7°38′E
- Country: Switzerland
- Canton: Valais
- District: Leuk

Government
  - Mayor: Roberto Schmidt

Area
  - Total: 55.15 km^{2} (21.29 sq mi)
- Elevation: 731 m (2,398 ft)

Population (2002)
  - Total: 3,376
  - Density: 61.21/km^{2} (158.5/sq mi)
- Time zone: UTC+01:00 (CET)
  - Summer (DST): UTC+02:00 (CEST)
- Postal code: 3953
- SFOS number: 6110
- ISO 3166 code: CH-VS
- Localities: Briannen, Gampinen, Leuk-Stadt, Pfyn, Pletschen, St. Josephsheim, Susten
- Surrounded by: Agarn, Albinen, Bratsch, Chandolin, Erschmatt, Guttet-Feschel, Inden, Salgesch, Turtmann, Varen
- Twin towns: Münchwilen, Thurgau (Switzerland)
- Website: www.leuk.ch

Leuk (German pronunciation: [ˈlɔʏk]; French: Loèche [lɔɛʃ]) is a municipality in the district of Leuk in the canton of Valais in Switzerland. On 1 January 2013, the former municipality of Erschmatt merged into the municipality of Leuk.

Historic aerial photograph by Werner Friedli from 1949

Since it controls access to the Gemmi Pass, it had some importance from the time of Roman Raetia. The Leukerbad thermal baths are just north of Leuk, towards the pass. It is the capital of the Leuk district of the Valais.

Leuk is home to one of the known installations of Onyx, the Swiss interception system for signals intelligence gathering.

== History ==
Leuk is first mentioned in 515 as villa de Leuca.

Leuk was already inhabited in the pre-Roman era. Scattered La Tène era graves with poppy-head pins, brooches and a belt hook have been found in Leuk. In the 6th century it belonged to the demesne of the King of Burgundy Sigismund, who donated it to the Abbey of Saint-Maurice. The local population of Romanized Celts gradually became Germanized around the turn of the millennium due to invading Alamanni. However, even by the 14th century there was still a strong Roman minority in Leuk.

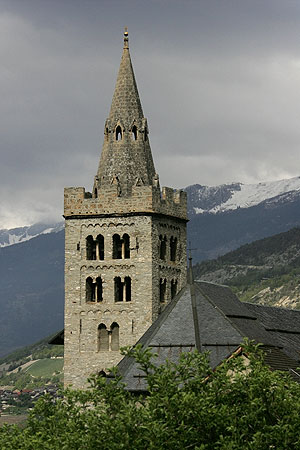
Romanesque tower of St. Stephan's church

The town's first church dates from the 6th or 7th century and probably originated from a Roman building. This church was replaced in the 9th century by a larger building. It was replaced again in the 11th and 12th centuries. The romanesque bell tower of the current church is from this third building. The current church was built by Ulrich Ruffiner in the gothic style. It was richly furnished with altars and sculptures and was consecrated in 1494 as St. Stephan's Church by Bishop Jost von Silenen. In the charnel house, with its dance of death fresco, 26 statues dating from the 13th to 16th centuries were discovered in 1982 under about a meter (three feet) of bones. The statues including an excellent Pietà from the 14th century. In addition to St. Stephan's parish church there were several other churches in town. They include a pilgrimage chapel at Thel and the Ringacker chapel, which was built in 1690-94 above a plague cemetery. A Marian shrine, whose hermitage was inhabited by a hermit around 1720–1885, is one of the most important baroque rooms of the Valais.

In the Early and High Middle Ages Leuk changed owners repeatedly until 1138 when it finally came under the authority of the Bishop of Sion. The new rulers encouraged Leuk's development by granting concessions. In 1209 Leuk was given the right to have its own weights and measures. In 1285 they built a hospital and in 1310 they added a warehouse, one on the old trade route between northern Italy and the markets of Champagne. With the warehouse they established a group of teamsters that provided extra draft animals to help wagons make it over the mountains. The episcopal fief‌holders Viztum and Meier built the Bishop's Castle (the seat of Meier) and the Viztumsturm (Viztum's tower). In the 14th century the castle ruled over three surrounding areas; Loye (Lobio), Tschablen (Cabulo) and Galdinen (Caldana). All three of those areas grew into independent municipalities. In 1458, Leuk codified the customary rights of the citizens into law. This "old castle law" was updated in 1563.

With the decline of the feudal system, the weakening of the secular episcopal power and the rise of the democratic self-consciousness of the Valais, the old order was replaced with a new power structure. The former leading families of de Leuca, Perrini, Raron and Pontemallio were replaced with new families including: the Werra, Mageran, Allet, Ambühl, Albertini, Gasner, Mayenzet, Zen-Ruffinen and Loretan. The village subsequently grew into an independent town with elegant homes and a new church. On the west, a tower and bridge were built in the Dala gorge. The Feschel gorge to the east was spanned with a bridge in 1563.

The two gorges and the river Rhone to the south provided excellent natural fortifications for the growing town. The borders of the town were the site of several bloody clashes. The first was the victory in 1296 of troops loyal to the bishop over the upper Valais nobility (including the vom Turn and von Raron families), who were supported by nobles from the Bernese Oberland. In 1386, Leuk prevented the advance of Count Amadeus VII of Savoy into the Upper Valais with the destruction of Dala bridge. In 1415, during the Rarner war, the Bishop's Castle and the Viztumsturm were destroyed by invaders. In 1541, Ulrich Ruffiner built the present Gothic-style town hall on the ruins of the Viztumsturm. During the fighting against the French in 1799, after the Battle of Pfyn Leuk was burned but escaped further damage.

The parish of Leuk is first documented in 1227. Starting in 1500 a number of surrounding villages left the Leuk parish to form their own daughter parishes, including; 1501 Leukerbad, 1660 Gampel, 1663 Turtmann, 1962 Susten. In the second half of the 16th century, the leading Leuker families tended to Protestantism. However, in 1604, when the Valais Grand Council met in Visp and voted to remain with the Catholic faith, these the families (especially the Mageran and Ambühl) decided to return to the old faith.

In the Middle Ages, the local economy was based on the transport of goods, alpine herding, farming and viticulture. The town produced gravel from the banks of the Rhone in the Pfynwald (Pfyn forest), until this was restricted for environmental reasons in the 1970s. Limestone mining commenced in 1928 on the Rhone in Susten but has now been given up. In 2005 there were ten large farms and seven wineries in the municipality. In 1908 the Alusuisse-Werke (now Alcan Ltd) opened a processing plant in Chippis and Steg which provided jobs for many people from Leuk. The Leuk-Leukerbad-Bahn railway line opened in 1915 and converted to bus operation in 1967. In 2005, the train station in Susten was rebuilt with a new railway bridge over the Rhone and a new rail tunnel towards Salgesch. Traditionally Leuk was the central administrative center of the region. At the beginning of the 21st century, it is also the educational, legal and services center in part due to the satellite earth station of International Teleport Switzerland AG. The large antennas of the earth station have made Leuk into a major intercontinental telecommunications center. Near the earth station are the antennas of the Swiss military Onyx system for electronic intelligence gathering.

In 1999, the Leuk Castle Foundation was established to restore and maintain the Bishop's Castle in Leuk. As part of the restoration, one of the medieval towers was topped with a glass cupola by the architect Mario Botta.

== Geography ==
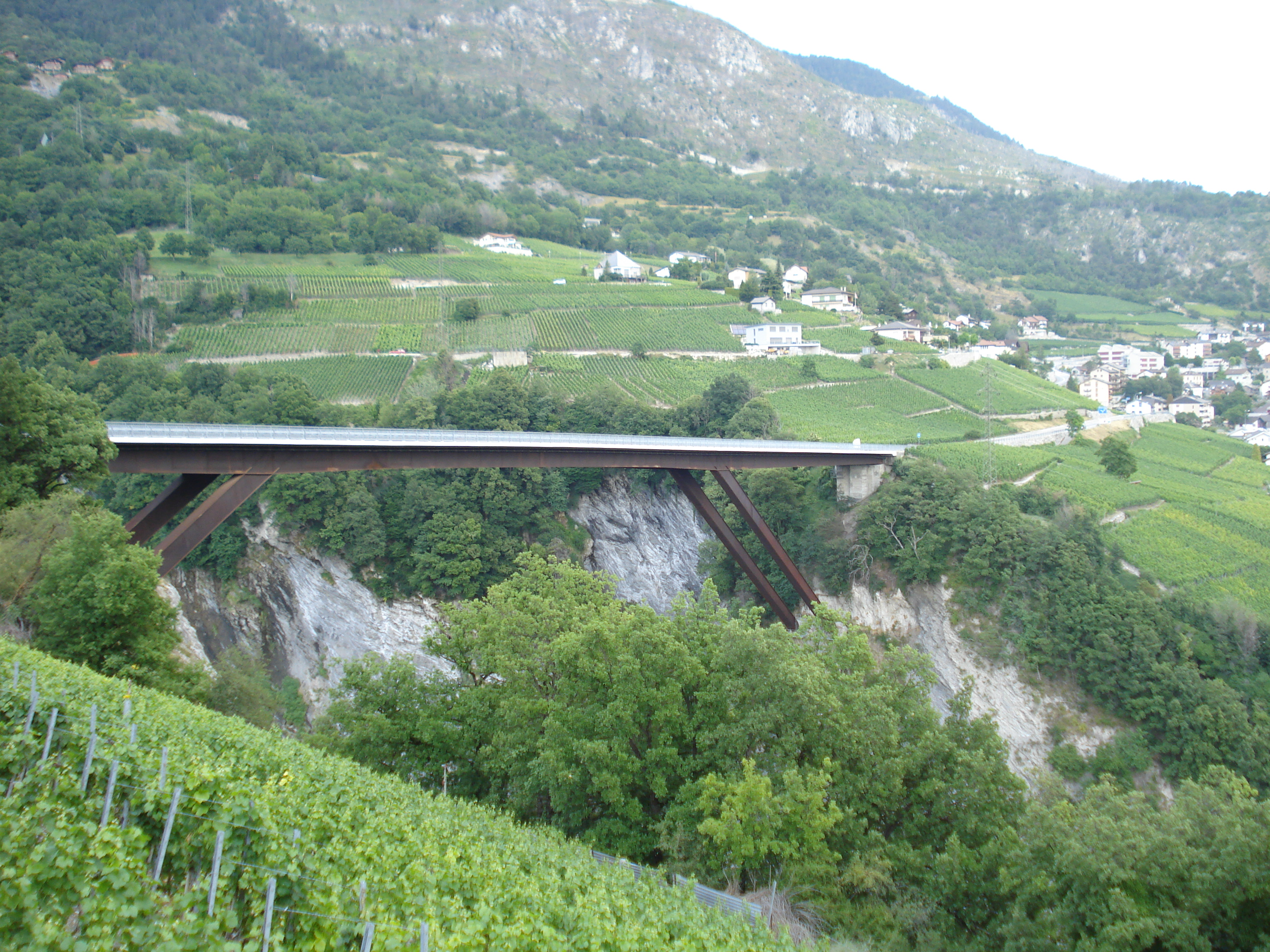
Bridge over the Dala gorge

Leuk has an area, as of 2011, of 44.1 square kilometers (17.0 mi^{2}). Of this area, 19.6% is used for agricultural purposes, while 48.9% is forested. Of the rest of the land, 4.8% is settled (buildings or roads) and 26.8% is unproductive land.

The municipality is the capital of the Leuk district. It is located above the right side of the Rhone, between the Dala gorge and the Feschelbach river. The town is surrounded by vineyards. It consists of the village of Leuk-Stadt, the castle, the village of Susten on the left bank of the Rhone and the hamlets of Brianen, Feithieren, Gampinen and Pfyn, and the mountain village of Erschmatt. The municipalities of Erschmatt and Leuk merged as per 1 January 2013, keeping the name Leuk.

== Coat of arms ==
The blazon of the municipal coat of arms is Gules a Griffin rampant coward langued and armed Argent holding in front paws a sword of the last.

== Demographics ==
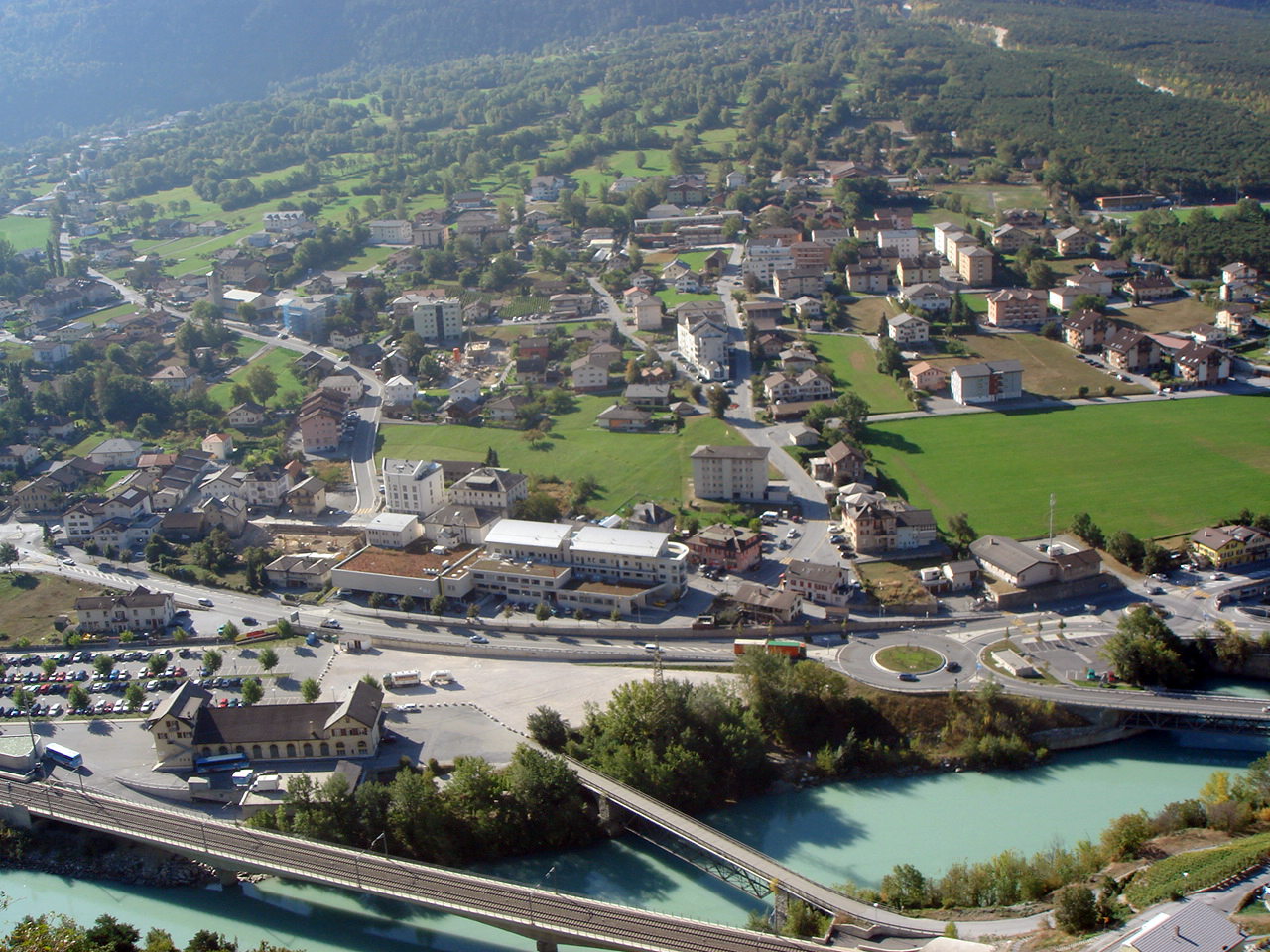
La Souste/Susten

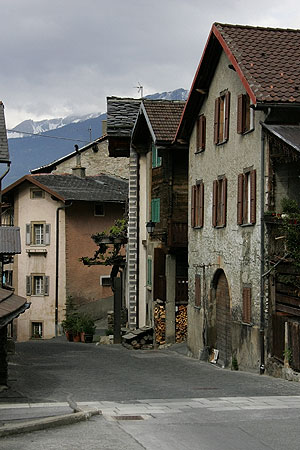
Houses in Leuk

Leuk has a population (as of December 2020) of 3,991. As of 2008, 11.0% of the population are resident foreign nationals. Over the last 10 years (1999–2009) the population has changed at a rate of 4.7%. It has changed at a rate of 3.3% due to migration and at a rate of 1.1% due to births and deaths.

Most of the population (as of 2000) speaks German (3,118 or 92.8%) as their first language, Albanian is the second most common (79 or 2.4%) and French is the third (52 or 1.5%). There are 15 people who speak Italian and 2 people who speak Romansh.

As of 2008, the gender distribution of the population was 49.6% male and 50.4% female. The population was made up of 1,526 Swiss men (43.8% of the population) and 203 (5.8%) non-Swiss men. There were 1,573 Swiss women (45.1%) and 184 (5.3%) non-Swiss women. Of the population in the municipality 1,617 or about 48.1% were born in Leuk and lived there in 2000. There were 985 or 29.3% who were born in the same canton, while 319 or 9.5% were born somewhere else in Switzerland, and 295 or 8.8% were born outside of Switzerland.

The age distribution of the population (as of 2000) is children and teenagers (0–19 years old) make up 24% of the population, while adults (20–64 years old) make up 59.8% and seniors (over 64 years old) make up 16.2%.

As of 2000, there were 1,401 people who were single and never married in the municipality. There were 1,602 married individuals, 221 widows or widowers and 137 individuals who are divorced.

As of 2000, there were 1,209 private households in the municipality, and an average of 2.6 persons per household. There were 330 households that consist of only one person and 124 households with five or more people. Out of a total of 1,264 households that answered this question, 26.1% were households made up of just one person and there were 14 adults who lived with their parents. Of the rest of the households, there are 328 married couples without children, 455 married couples with children. There were 64 single parents with a child or children. There were 18 households that were made up of unrelated people and 55 households that were made up of some sort of institution or another collective housing.

In 2000 there were 534 single family homes (or 62.1% of the total) out of a total of 860 inhabited buildings. There were 217 multi-family buildings (25.2%), along with 59 multi-purpose buildings that were mostly used for housing (6.9%) and 50 other use buildings (commercial or industrial) that also had some housing (5.8%).

In 2000, a total of 1,126 apartments (79.5% of the total) were permanently occupied, while 241 apartments (17.0%) were seasonally occupied and 50 apartments (3.5%) were empty. As of 2009, the construction rate of new housing units was 2.3 new units per 1000 residents. The vacancy rate for the municipality, in 2010, was 0.84%.

The historical population is given in the following chart:

== Heritage sites of national significance ==
The Dalaturm, the Church of St. Stephan, the Rathaus (Town council house), the Ringacker Chapel of Mariä Empfängnis with the Hermitage and Zen-Ruffinen Castle are listed as Swiss heritage site of national significance. The entire small town of Leuk and village of Erschmatt are part of the Inventory of Swiss Heritage Sites.

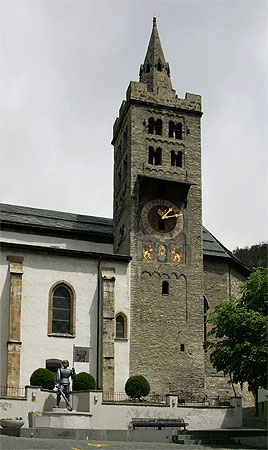
Church of St. Stephan

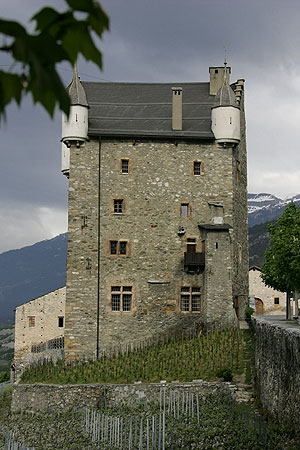
Rathaus (Town council house)

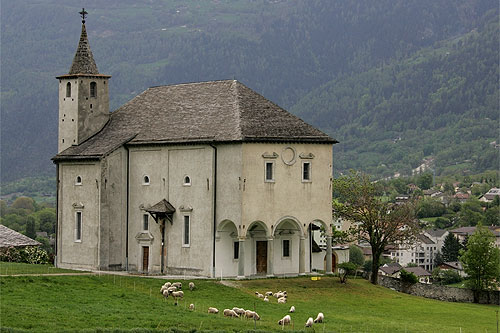
Ringacker Chapel of Mariä Empfängnis with Hermitage

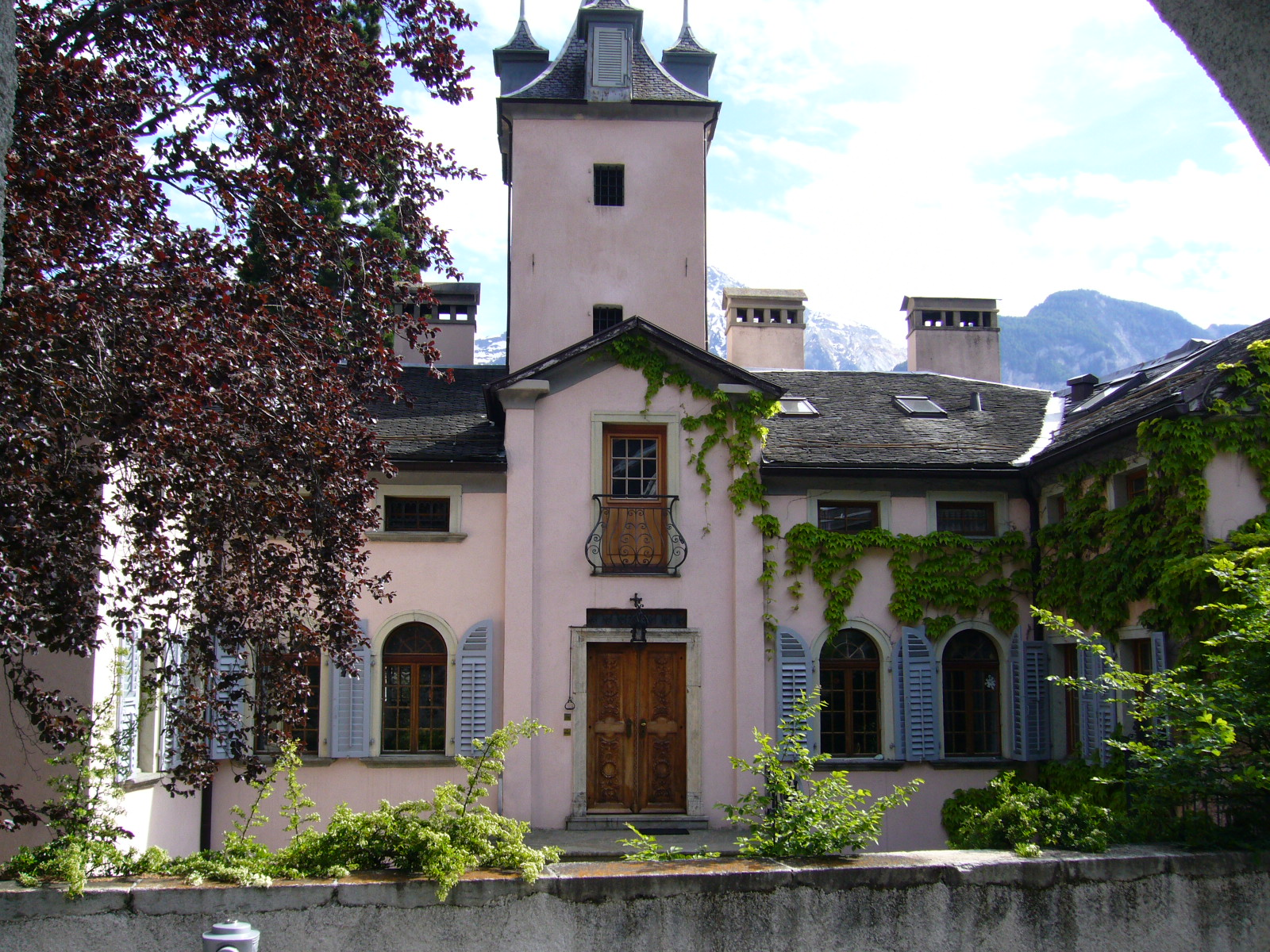
Zen-Ruffinen Castle

== Politics ==
In the 2007 federal election the most popular party was the CVP which received 71.78% of the vote. The next three most popular parties were the SP (13.34%), the SVP (11.2%) and the FDP (1.76%). In the federal election, a total of 1,856 votes were cast, and the voter turnout was 75.9%.

In the 2009 Conseil d'État/Staatsrat election a total of 1,684 votes were cast, of which 117 or about 6.9% were invalid. The voter participation was 70.5%, which is much more than the cantonal average of 54.67%. In the 2007 Swiss Council of States election a total of 1,849 votes were cast, of which 73 or about 3.9% were invalid. The voter participation was 76.4%, which is much more than the cantonal average of 59.88%.

== Economy ==
As of 2010, Leuk had an unemployment rate of 2.2%. As of 2008, there were 148 people employed in the primary economic sector and about 56 businesses involved in this sector. 218 people were employed in the secondary sector and there were 44 businesses in this sector. 850 people were employed in the tertiary sector, with 133 businesses in this sector. There were 1,595 residents of the municipality who were employed in some capacity, of which females made up 41.8% of the workforce.

In 2008 the total number of full-time equivalent jobs was 952. The number of jobs in the primary sector was 84, of which 71 were in agriculture and 13 were in forestry or lumber production. The number of jobs in the secondary sector was 205 of which 46 or (22.4%) were in manufacturing and 138 (67.3%) were in construction. The number of jobs in the tertiary sector was 663. In the tertiary sector; 91 or 13.7% were in wholesale or retail sales or the repair of motor vehicles, 48 or 7.2% were in the movement and storage of goods, 95 or 14.3% were in a hotel or restaurant, 18 or 2.7% were in the information industry, 28 or 4.2% were the insurance or financial industry, 42 or 6.3% were technical professionals or scientists, 83 or 12.5% were in education and 204 or 30.8% were in health care.

In 2000, there were 398 workers who commuted into the municipality and 877 workers who commuted away. The municipality is a net exporter of workers, with about 2.2 workers leaving the municipality for every one entering. Of the working population, 20.9% used public transportation to get to work, and 55.8% used a private car.

== Religion ==
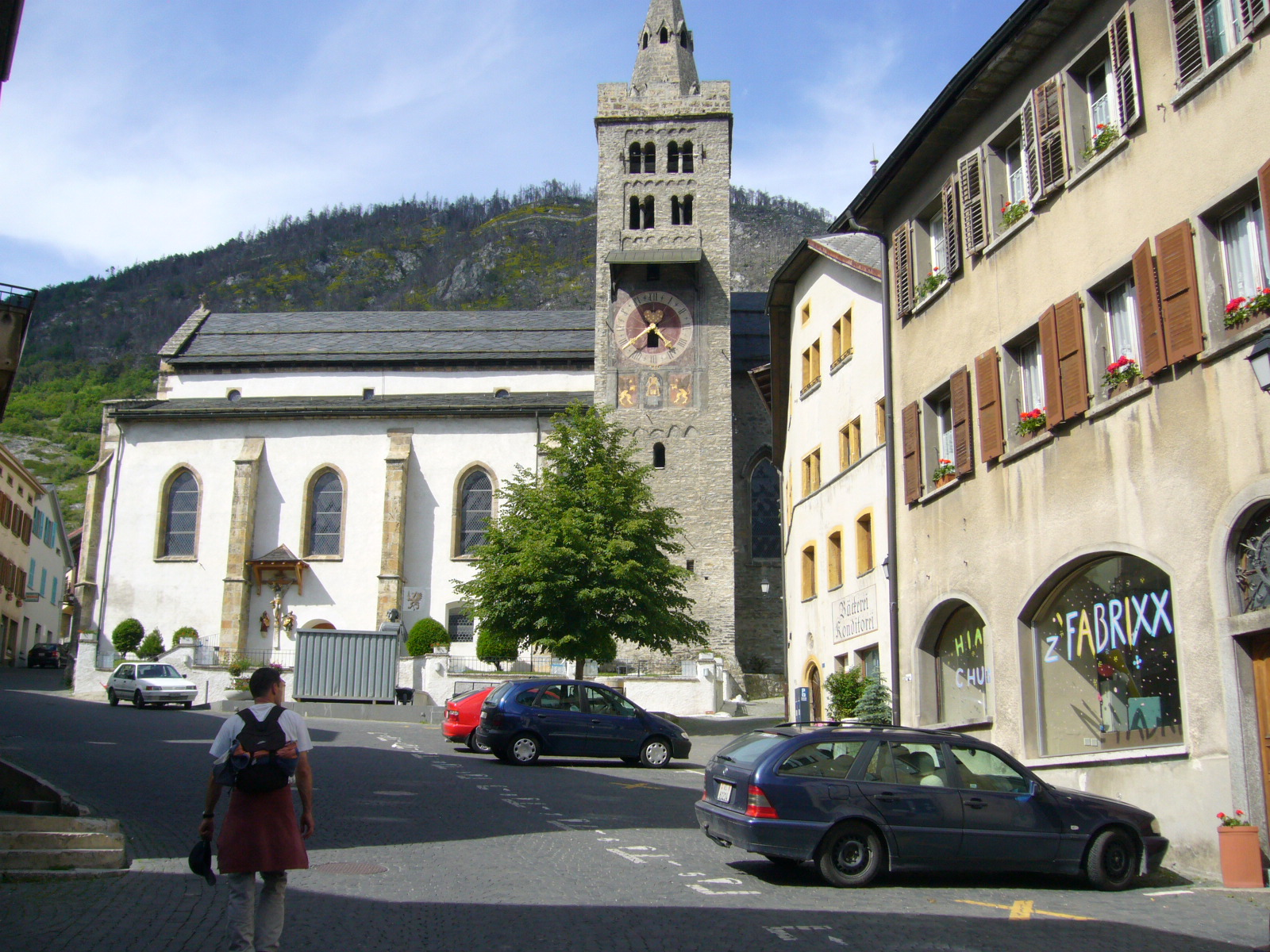
St. Stephan's Church

From the 2000 census, 2,845 or 84.6% were Roman Catholic, while 159 or 4.7% belonged to the Swiss Reformed Church. Of the rest of the population, there were 21 members of an Orthodox church (or about 0.62% of the population), there were 2 individuals (or about 0.06% of the population) who belonged to the Christian Catholic Church, and there were 29 individuals (or about 0.86% of the population) who belonged to another Christian church. There were 141 (or about 4.20% of the population) who were Islamic. There was 1 person who was Hindu and 4 individuals who belonged to another church. 48 (or about 1.43% of the population) belonged to no church, are agnostic or atheist, and 124 individuals (or about 3.69% of the population) did not answer the question.

== Education ==
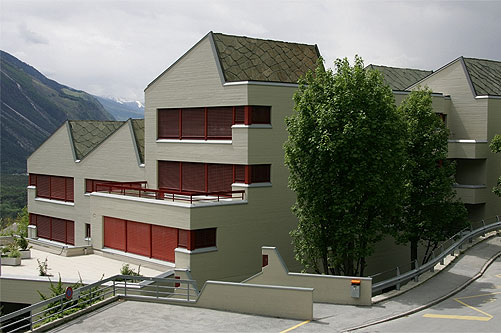
Secondary school in Leuk

In Leuk about 1,149 or (34.2%) of the population have completed non-mandatory upper secondary education, and 215 or (6.4%) have completed additional higher education (either university or a Fachhochschule). Of the 215 who completed tertiary schooling, 73.5% were Swiss men, 21.4% were Swiss women, 3.7% were non-Swiss men.

During the 2010–2011 school year there were a total of 438 students in the Leuk school system. The education system in the Canton of Valais allows young children to attend one year of non-obligatory Kindergarten. During that school year, there 4 kindergarten classes (KG1 or KG2) and 63 kindergarten students. The canton's school system requires students to attend six years of primary school. In Leuk there were a total of 13 classes and 258 students in the primary school. The secondary school program consists of three lower, obligatory years of schooling (orientation classes), followed by three to five years of optional, advanced schools. There were 180 lower secondary students who attended school in Leuk. All the upper secondary students attended school in another municipality.

As of 2000, there were 128 students in Leuk who came from another municipality, while 124 residents attended schools outside the municipality.

== Notable people ==
- Franz Xaver, Baron von Werra (1914 in Leuk – 1941), a German World War II fighter pilot and flying ace who was shot down over Britain, captured and escaped back to Germany
- Rabea Grand (born 1984 in Leuk), a retired alpine skier who rose to be the Swiss national champion at the giant slalom in 2009
