= Guttet-Feschel =

- Municipality
- Flag Coat of arms
- Location of Guttet-Feschel
- Location within Switzerland Location within Canton of Valais
- Coordinates: 46°19′N 7°39′E
- Country: Switzerland
- Canton: Valais
- District: Leuk

Government
  - Mayor: Eduard Schnyder

Area
  - Total: 10.5 km^{2} (4.1 sq mi)
- Elevation: 1,345 m (4,413 ft)

Population (December 2002)
  - Total: 425
  - Density: 40.5/km^{2} (105/sq mi)
- Time zone: UTC+01:00 (CET)
  - Summer (DST): UTC+02:00 (CEST)
- Postal code: 3956
- SFOS number: 6117
- ISO 3166 code: CH-VS
- Surrounded by: Albinen, Erschmatt, Ferden, Leuk, Leukerbad
- Website: www.guttet-feschel.ch

Guttet-Feschel is a municipality in the district of Leuk in the canton of Valais in Switzerland. It was formed from the union of the municipalities of Guttet and Feschel in 2000.

== History ==
Feschel is first mentioned in 1267 as Vexli, Veselli. Guttet is first mentioned in 1261 as de gottet.

== Geography ==
Guttet-Feschel has an area, as of 2009, of 10.5 square kilometers (4.1 mi^{2}). Of this area, 3.87 km^{2} (1.49 mi^{2}) or 36.8% is used for agricultural purposes, while 2.92 km^{2} (1.13 mi^{2}) or 27.8% is forested. Of the rest of the land, 0.37 km^{2} (0.14 mi^{2}) or 3.5% is settled (buildings or roads), 0.06 km^{2} (15 acres) or 0.6% is either rivers or lakes and 3.28 km^{2} (1.27 mi^{2}) or 31.2% is unproductive land.

Of the built up area, housing and buildings made up 1.5% and transportation infrastructure made up 1.6%. Out of the forested land, 24.9% of the total land area is heavily forested and 2.9% is covered with orchards or small clusters of trees. Of the agricultural land, 0.1% is used for growing crops and 9.4% is pastures and 27.2% is used for alpine pastures. Of the water in the municipality, 0.3% is in lakes and 0.3% is in rivers and streams. Of the unproductive areas, 9.8% is unproductive vegetation and 21.1% is too rocky for vegetation.

The municipality, located in the Leuk district, was created by the merger of Guttet and Fesche.

== Demographics ==
Guttet-Feschel has a population (as of December 2020) of 414. As of 2008, 4.7% of the population are resident foreign nationals. Over the last 10 years (1999–2009 ) the population has changed at a rate of -1.5%. It has changed at a rate of 1.5% due to migration and at a rate of -3.3% due to births and deaths.

Most of the population (as of 2000) speaks German (399 or 97.3%) as their first language, Albanian is the second most common (5 or 1.2%) and French is the third (4 or 1.0%). There is 1 person who speaks Italian.

As of 2008, the gender distribution of the population was 48.6% male and 51.4% female. The population was made up of 211 Swiss men (46.8% of the population) and 8 (1.8%) non-Swiss men. There were 220 Swiss women (48.8%) and 12 (2.7%) non-Swiss women. Of the population in the municipality 285 or about 69.5% were born in Guttet-Feschel and lived there in 2000. There were 68 or 16.6% who were born in the same canton, while 34 or 8.3% were born somewhere else in Switzerland, and 12 or 2.9% were born outside of Switzerland.

The age distribution of the population (as of 2000) is children and teenagers (0–19 years old) make up 27.3% of the population, while adults (20–64 years old) make up 52.4% and seniors (over 64 years old) make up 20.2%.

As of 2000, there were 164 people who were single and never married in the municipality. There were 202 married individuals, 32 widows or widowers and 12 individuals who are divorced.

As of 2000, there were 161 private households in the municipality, and an average of 2.5 persons per household. There were 54 households that consist of only one person and 14 households with five or more people. Out of a total of 169 households that answered this question, 32.0% were households made up of just one person and there were 2 adults who lived with their parents. Of the rest of the households, there are 30 married couples without children, 53 married couples with children There were 19 single parents with a child or children. There were 3 households that were made up of unrelated people and 8 households that were made up of some sort of institution or another collective housing.

In 2000 there were 141 single family homes (or 65.3% of the total) out of a total of 216 inhabited buildings. There were 43 multi-family buildings (19.9%), along with 17 multi-purpose buildings that were mostly used for housing (7.9%) and 15 other use buildings (commercial or industrial) that also had some housing (6.9%).

In 2000, a total of 157 apartments (54.1% of the total) were permanently occupied, while 105 apartments (36.2%) were seasonally occupied and 28 apartments (9.7%) were empty. The vacancy rate for the municipality, in 2010, was 1.32%.

The historical population is given in the following chart:

== Sights ==
The entire village of Feschel is designated as part of the Inventory of Swiss Heritage Sites.

== Politics ==
In the 2007 federal election the most popular party was the CVP which received 53.3% of the vote. The next three most popular parties were the SVP (22.32%), the SP (15.79%) and the FDP (7.66%). In the federal election, a total of 224 votes were cast, and the voter turnout was 63.5%.

In the 2009 Conseil d'État/Staatsrat election a total of 199 votes were cast, of which 5 or about 2.5% were invalid. The voter participation was 58.5%, which is similar to the cantonal average of 54.67%. In the 2007 Swiss Council of States election a total of 222 votes were cast, of which 5 or about 2.3% were invalid. The voter participation was 64.4%, which is similar to the cantonal average of 59.88%.

== Economy ==
As of 2010, Guttet-Feschel had an unemployment rate of 2.6%. As of 2008, there were 20 people employed in the primary economic sector and about 9 businesses involved in this sector. 14 people were employed in the secondary sector and there were 4 businesses in this sector. 36 people were employed in the tertiary sector, with 11 businesses in this sector. There were 164 residents of the municipality who were employed in some capacity, of which females made up 34.1% of the workforce.

In 2008 the total number of full-time equivalent jobs was 44. The number of jobs in the primary sector was 7, all of which were in agriculture. The number of jobs in the secondary sector was 14 of which 3 or (21.4%) were in manufacturing and 11 (78.6%) were in construction. The number of jobs in the tertiary sector was 23. In the tertiary sector; 5 or 21.7% were in wholesale or retail sales or the repair of motor vehicles, 4 or 17.4% were in a hotel or restaurant, 1 was the insurance or financial industry, 4 or 17.4% were technical professionals or scientists, 3 or 13.0% were in education and 6 or 26.1% were in health care.

In 2000, there were 8 workers who commuted into the municipality and 112 workers who commuted away. The municipality is a net exporter of workers, with about 14.0 workers leaving the municipality for every one entering. Of the working population, 17.7% used public transportation to get to work, and 59.1% used a private car.

== Religion ==
From the 2000 census, 373 or 91.0% were Roman Catholic, while 21 or 5.1% belonged to the Swiss Reformed Church. Of the rest of the population, there was 1 member of an Orthodox church. There were 5 (or about 1.22% of the population) who were Islamic. 3 (or about 0.73% of the population) belonged to no church, are agnostic or atheist, and 7 individuals (or about 1.71% of the population) did not answer the question.

== Education ==
In Guttet-Feschel about 143 or (34.9%) of the population have completed non-mandatory upper secondary education, and 12 or (2.9%) have completed additional higher education (either university or a Fachhochschule). Of the 12 who completed tertiary schooling, 75.0% were Swiss men, 25.0% were Swiss women.

As of 2000, there were 51 students from Guttet-Feschel who attended schools outside the municipality.
