= Onyx (interception system) =

Intercantonal intelligence gathering system in Switzerland

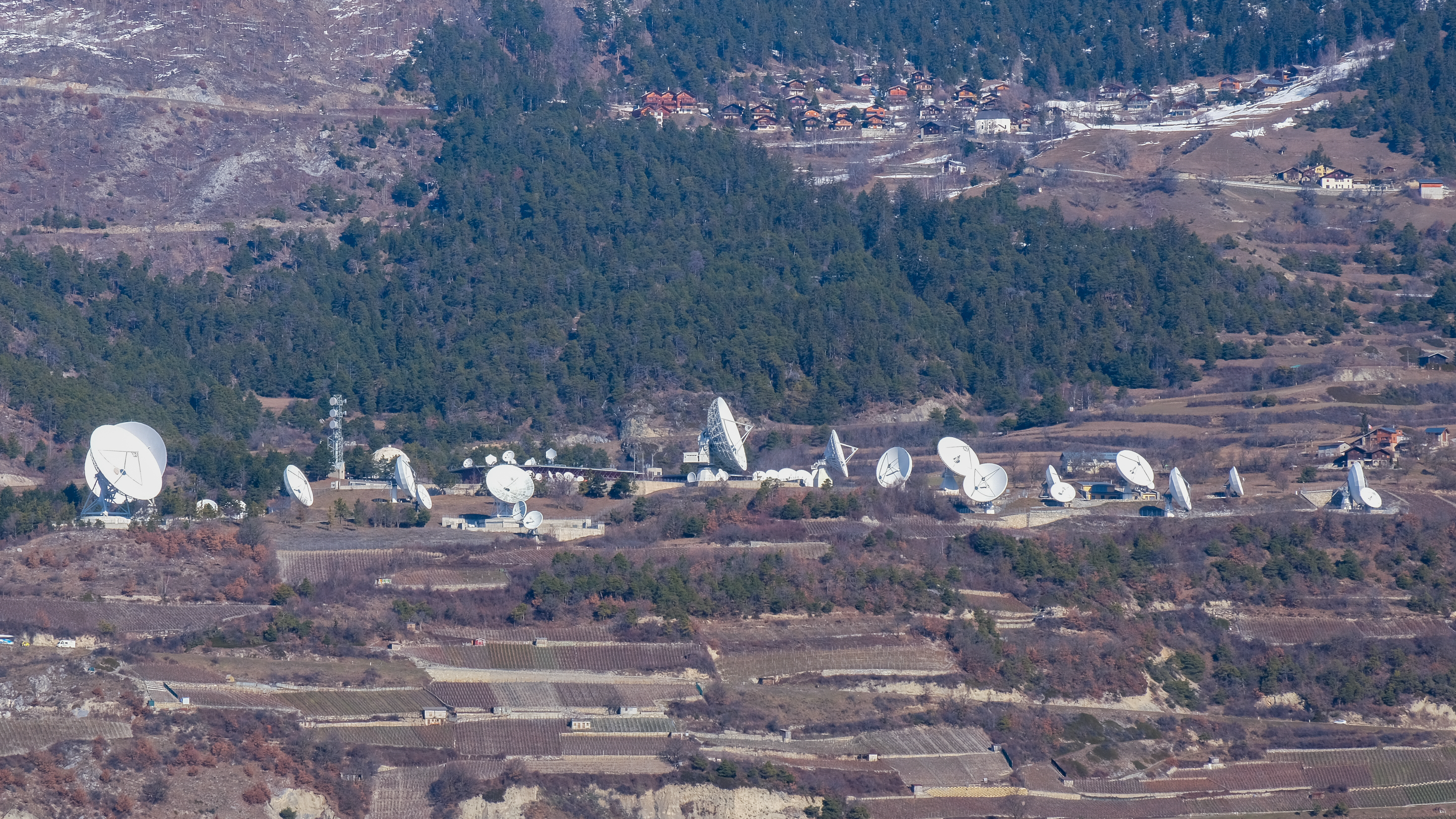
Onyx interception station in Leuk

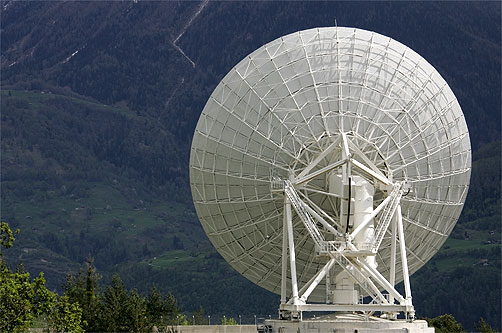
Detail of Leuk interception station

Onyx is a Swiss intelligence gathering system maintained by the Federal Intelligence Service - Nachrichtendienst des Bundes (NDB). The costs of the system are not public, but the amount of 100 million Swiss francs has been mentioned several times, in particular in 2000 by Werner Marti, SP deputy to the National Council (Switzerland). In March 2005, journalist Urs Paul Engeler estimated that the costs (hidden in various military construction budgets) reached 400 million CHF. The Onyx system was launched in 2000, originally under the name SATOS-3 (the SATOS 1 and 2 systems were started in 1992, in particular to intercept faxes), and was completed in late 2005.

== Purpose ==
The goal of the system is to monitor both civil and military communications, such as telephone, fax or Internet traffic, carried by satellite. Onyx uses lists of keywords to filter the intercepted content for information of interest, and the choice of keywords by the intelligence community must be approved by an independent commission. The system is not supposed to monitor internal communications; however, the monitoring of a communication between a person in Switzerland and someone in another country is allowed. The Swiss Federal Council has indicated that Onyx is not linked to other foreign systems such as ECHELON; according to the Council, the confusion and rumours about this issue are due to the sale by Swisscom to Verestar (now SES Americom) of the ground satellite communication station of Leuk (next to the Onyx site) in 2000. The use of the system is controlled by an independent control authority composed of members of the federal administration.

== Active sites ==
Location of Onyx interception stations

Active sites include the following:

- Zimmerwald (Canton of Bern) 46°53′12.46″N 7°28′41.41″E
- Heimenschwand (part of the municipality of Buchholterberg, Canton of Bern) 46°49′52.81″N 7°42′57.99″E: 3 antennas.
- Leuk (Canton of Valais) 46°19′05″N 7°38′43″E: 4 antennas.

== Intercepted black sites fax ==
On 8 January 2006, the Swiss newspaper Sonntagsblick published a secret report produced by the Swiss government using data intercepted by Onyx. The report described a fax sent by the Egyptian department of Foreign Affairs to the Egyptian Embassy in London, and described the existence of secret detention facilities ("black sites") run by the CIA in Eastern Europe. The Swiss government did not officially confirm the existence of the report, but started a military judiciary procedure for leakage of secret documents against the newspaper on 9 January 2006. While the authenticity of the fax was implicitly confirmed during the trial, the reporter and newspaper were cleared of all charges on 17 April 2007.
