= Zen-Ruffinen Castle =

Castle in Leuk, Switzerland

Zen-Ruffinen / Loretan
- Leuk in Switzerland
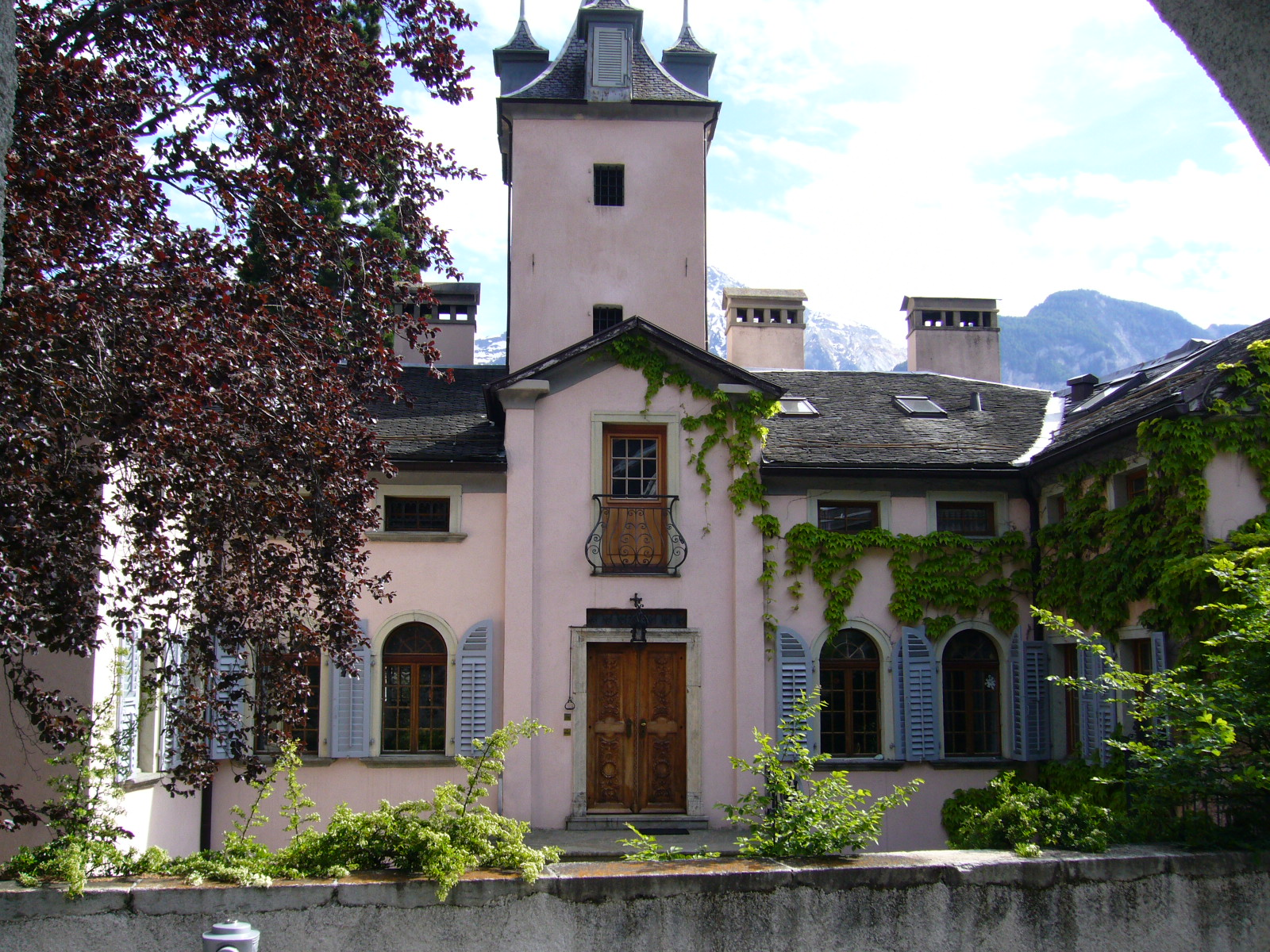
- Zen-Ruffinen Castle in Leuk

Location
- Coordinates: 46°19′01″N 7°38′08″E

Site history
- Built: 17th century

Swiss Cultural Property of National Significance

Zen-Ruffinen Castle or Loretan also known as de Werra is a castle in the municipality of Leuk of the Canton of Valais in Switzerland. It is a Swiss heritage site of national significance.

The complex consists of several buildings constructed over centuries. Zen-Ruffinen was built for the Zen-Ruffinen family in the 17th century. The center of the building and the stair tower were built in 1611–12. The Zen-Ruffinen family was a powerful patrician family which included two Bishops of Sion. The complex was extended for Baron Ferdinand de Werra in the 19th century. The south-west corner of the de Werra extension includes an older wall from 1630.

== See also ==
- List of castles in Switzerland
- Château
