= Gampel =

Former municipality of Switzerland in Valais

- Former municipality
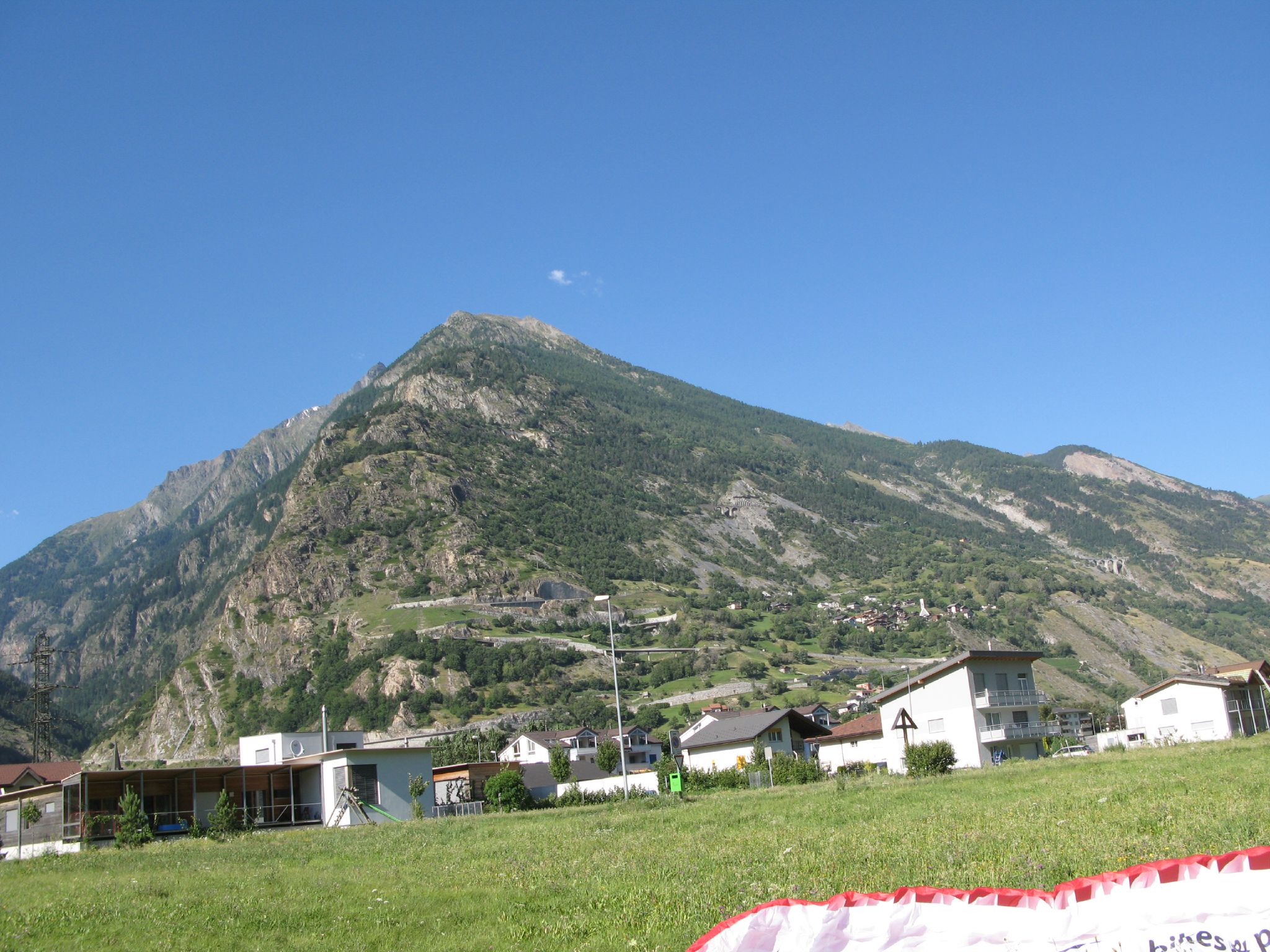
- Gampel village

- Flag Coat of arms
- Location of Gampel
- Location within Switzerland Location within Canton of Valais
- Coordinates: 46°19′N 7°45′E
- Country: Switzerland
- Canton: Valais
- District: Leuk

Area
  - Total: 16.9 km^{2} (6.5 sq mi)
- Elevation: 634 m (2,080 ft)

Population (December 2002)
  - Total: 1,385
  - Density: 82.0/km^{2} (212/sq mi)
- Time zone: UTC+01:00 (CET)
  - Summer (DST): UTC+02:00 (CEST)
- Postal code: 3945
- SFOS number: 6107
- ISO 3166 code: CH-VS
- Surrounded by: Bratsch, Erschmatt, Ferden, Niedergesteln, Steg, Turtmann
- Website: www.gampel.ch

Gampel is a village and former municipality in the district of Leuk in the canton of Valais in Switzerland. The village of Gempel is located at the southern entrance to the Lötschental or Lötschen valley. The eastern border of the village is the Lonza river, which is also the district border and the border with the neighboring village of Steg.

Gampel is now in the municipality of Gampel-Bratsch. It should not be confused with the municipality Gampelen in the canton of Bern.

== History ==
Gampel is first mentioned in 1238 as Champilz. It was an independent municipality until January 1, 2009, when it merged with Bratsch to form the municipality of Gampel-Bratsch.

== Coat of arms ==
The blazon of the village coat of arms is Azure in dexter a Mullet of Six Or in sinister an Increscent inverted Argent in base Coupeaux of the second.

== Demographics ==
Gampel has a population (as of December 2002) of 1,385.

Most of the population (as of 2000) speaks German (1,188 or 91.3%) as their first language, Albanian is the second most common (33 or 2.5%) and Serbo-Croatian is the third (25 or 1.9%). There are 15 people who speak French, 22 people who speak Italian.

Of the population in the village 662 or about 50.9% were born in Gampel and lived there in 2000. There were 388 or 29.8% who were born in the same canton, while 65 or 5.0% were born somewhere else in Switzerland, and 151 or 11.6% were born outside of Switzerland. As of 2000, there were 547 people who were single and never married in the village. There were 681 married individuals, 50 widows or widowers and 23 individuals who are divorced.

There were 147 households that consist of only one person and 44 households with five or more people. Out of a total of 520 households that answered this question, 28.3% were households made up of just one person and there were 5 adults who lived with their parents. Of the rest of the households, there are 127 married couples without children, 199 married couples with children There were 23 single parents with a child or children. There were 4 households that were made up of unrelated people and 15 households that were made up of some sort of institution or another collective housing.

In 2000 there were 177 single family homes (or 53.5% of the total) out of a total of 331 inhabited buildings. There were 93 multi-family buildings (28.1%), along with 39 multi-purpose buildings that were mostly used for housing (11.8%) and 22 other use buildings (commercial or industrial) that also had some housing (6.6%).

In 2000, a total of 474 apartments (70.9% of the total) were permanently occupied, while 167 apartments (25.0%) were seasonally occupied and 28 apartments (4.2%) were empty.

The historical population is given in the following chart:

== Politics ==
In the 2007 federal election the most popular party was the CVP which received 65.42% of the vote. The next three most popular parties were the SVP (21.42%), the SP (7.88%) and the FDP (3.95%). In the federal election, a total of 804 votes were cast, and the voter turnout was 84.9%.

== Economy ==
As of 2010, Gampel had an unemployment rate of 0%. As of 2008, there were people employed in the primary economic sector and about businesses involved in this sector. No one was employed in the secondary sector or the tertiary sector. There were 645 residents of the village who were employed in some capacity, of which females made up 38.9% of the workforce.

In 2008 the total number of full-time equivalent jobs was 408. The number of jobs in the primary sector was 17, all of which were in agriculture. The number of jobs in the secondary sector was 195 of which 59 or (30.3%) were in manufacturing and 136 (69.7%) were in construction. The number of jobs in the tertiary sector was 196. In the tertiary sector; 47 or 24.0% were in the sale or repair of motor vehicles, 14 or 7.1% were in the movement and storage of goods, 29 or 14.8% were in a hotel or restaurant, 15 or 7.7% were the insurance or financial industry, 19 or 9.7% were technical professionals or scientists, 28 or 14.3% were in education and 15 or 7.7% were in health care.

In 2000, there were 322 workers who commuted into the village and 397 workers who commuted away. The village is a net exporter of workers, with about 1.2 workers leaving the village for every one entering. About 1.9% of the workforce coming into Gampel are coming from outside Switzerland. Of the working population, % used public transportation to get to work, and % used a private car.

== Religion ==
From the 2000 census, 1,144 or 87.9% were Roman Catholic, while 24 or 1.8% belonged to the Swiss Reformed Church. Of the rest of the population, there were 18 members of an Orthodox church (or about 1.38% of the population), and there were 16 individuals (or about 1.23% of the population) who belonged to another Christian church. There were 60 (or about 4.61% of the population) who were Islamic. There were 4 individuals who were Buddhist. 8 (or about 0.61% of the population) belonged to no church, are agnostic or atheist, and 35 individuals (or about 2.69% of the population) did not answer the question.

== Education ==
In Gampel about 481 or (37.0%) of the population have completed non-mandatory upper secondary education, and 109 or (8.4%) have completed additional higher education (either University or a Fachhochschule). Of the 109 who completed tertiary schooling, 73.4% were Swiss men, 13.8% were Swiss women, 7.3% were non-Swiss men and 5.5% were non-Swiss women.

During the 2010-2011 school year there were a total of 308 students in the Gampel school system. The education system in the Canton of Valais allows young children to attend one year of non-obligatory Kindergarten. During that school year, there 2 kindergarten classes (KG1 or KG2) and 42 kindergarten students. The canton's school system requires students to attend six years of primary school. In Gampel there were a total of 8 classes and 168 students in the primary school. The secondary school program consists of three lower, obligatory years of schooling (orientation classes), followed by three to five years of optional, advanced schools. There were 140 lower secondary students who attended school in Gampel. All the upper secondary students attended school in another municipality.

As of 2000, there were 135 students in Gampel who came from another village, while 37 residents attended schools outside the village.
