= Torrenthorn =

Mountain in Switzerland

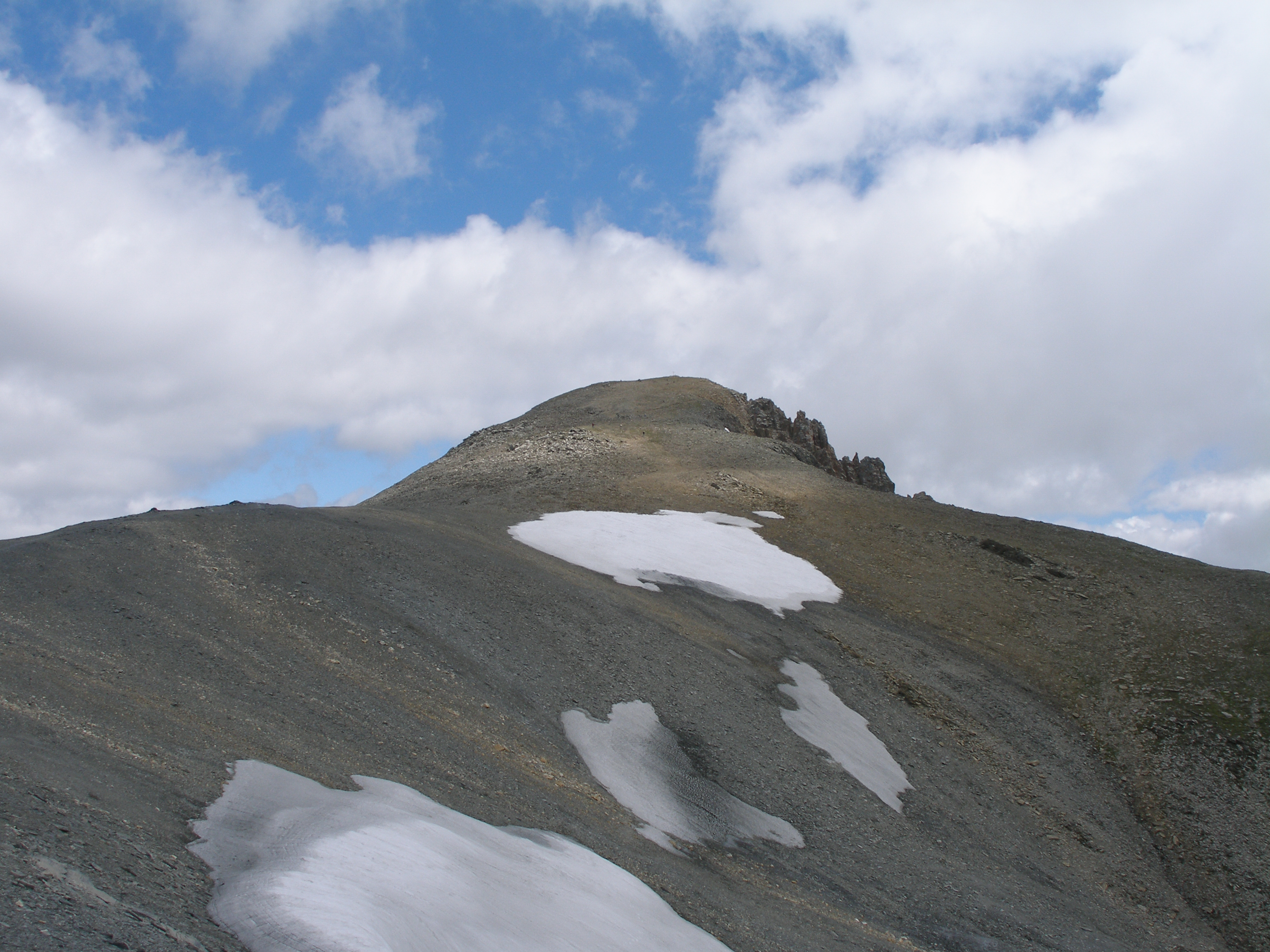

Highest point
- Elevation: 2,998 m (9,836 ft)
- Prominence: 110 m (360 ft)
- Parent peak: Majinghorn
- Coordinates: 46°22′39″N 7°40′42.4″E

Geography
- Location within Switzerland
- Location: Valais, Switzerland
- Parent range: Bernese Alps

The Torrenthorn is a mountain of the Bernese Alps, overlooking Leukerbad in the canton of Valais. It lies south of the Majinghorn.

In winter the Torrenthorn is part of a ski area.
