= Bratsch =

- Former municipality
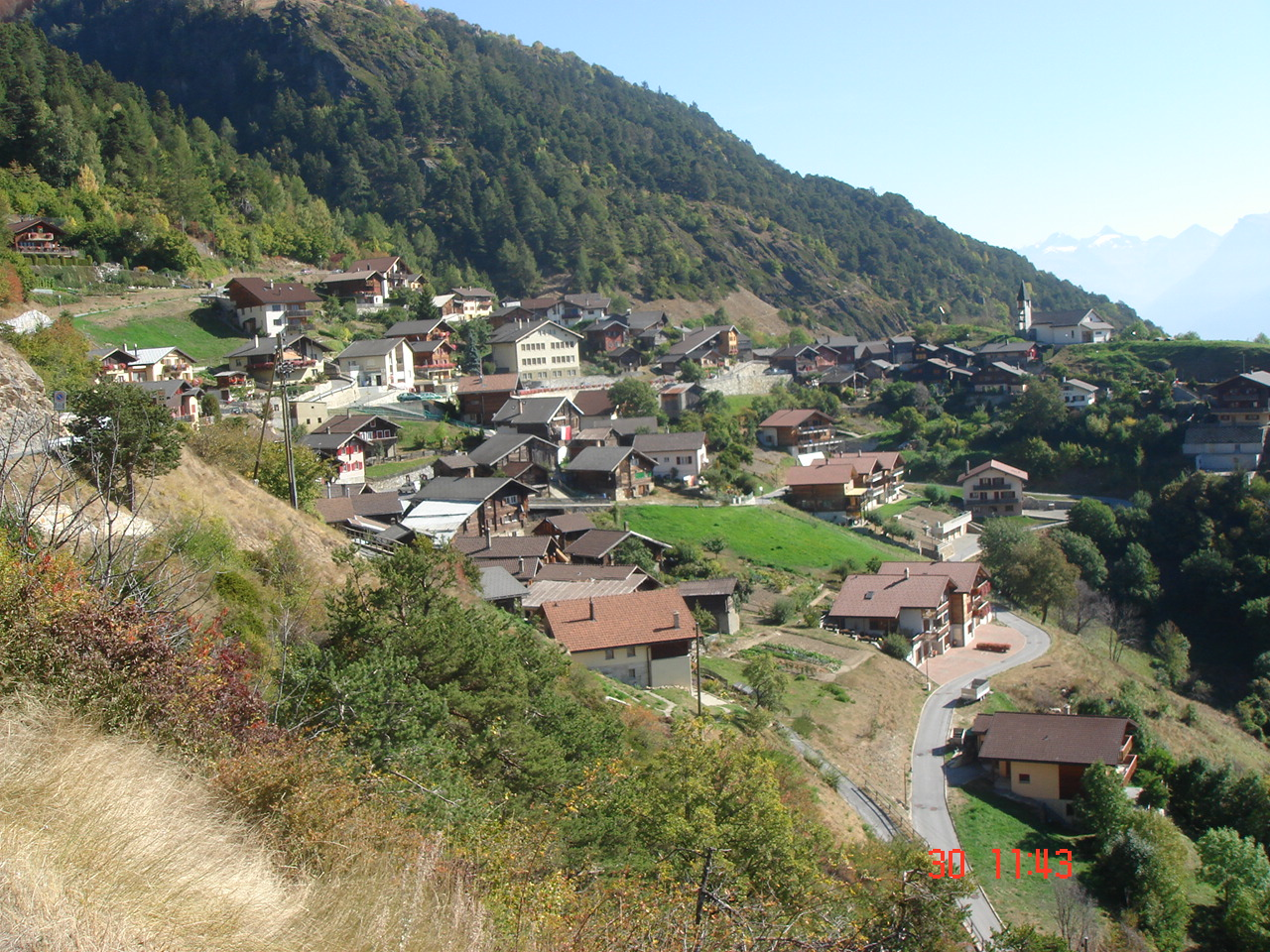
- Bratsch village

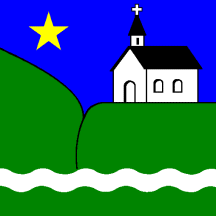
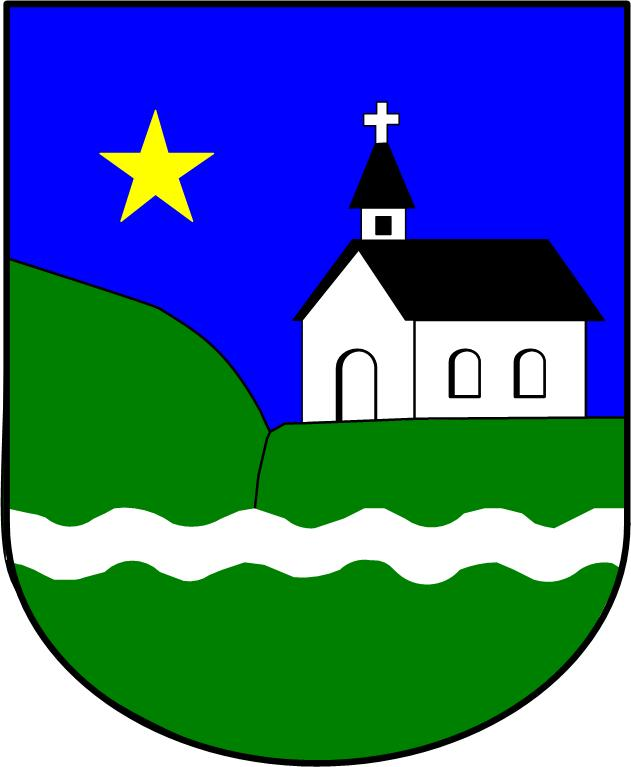
- Flag Coat of arms
- Location of Bratsch
- Location within Switzerland Location within Canton of Valais
- Coordinates: 46°19′N 7°42′E
- Country: Switzerland
- Canton: Valais
- District: Leuk
- Municipality: Gampel-Bratsch

Area
  - Total: 6.2 km^{2} (2.4 sq mi)
- Elevation: 1,090 m (3,580 ft)

Population (December 2002)
  - Total: 490
  - Density: 79/km^{2} (200/sq mi)
- Time zone: UTC+01:00 (CET)
  - Summer (DST): UTC+02:00 (CEST)
- Postal code: 3957
- SFOS number: 6103
- ISO 3166 code: CH-VS
- Twin towns: Horw (Switzerland)
- Website: www.bratsch.ch

Bratsch is a village in the municipality of Gampel-Bratsch in the district of Leuk of the canton of Valais in Switzerland.

Bratsch was an independent municipality until January 1, 2009, when it merged with Gampel to form Gampel-Bratsch.

== History ==
Bratsch is first mentioned in 1228 and 1242 as Praes. In 1309 it was mentioned as Prahcs, in 1322 as Praes, in 1357 as Prayes, in 1408 as Prages and in 1532 as Bratsch.

== Coat of arms ==
The blazon of the village coat of arms is In azure on a church in argent with a cross of the same, covered with sable, placed in sinister on a mountain entailed in vert and in dexter on a mullet in or, in the point a wavy device (river) in argent surmounting on the mountains.

== Demographics ==
Bratsch has a population (as of December 2002) of 490.

Most of the population (as of 2000) speaks German (460 or 99.1%) as their first language, Russian is the second most common (2 or 0.4%) and French is the third (1 or 0.2%). There is 1 person who speaks Romansh.

Of the population in the village 291 or about 62.7% were born in Bratsch and lived there in 2000. There were 154 or 33.2% who were born in the same canton, while 10 or 2.2% were born somewhere else in Switzerland, and 5 or 1.1% were born outside of Switzerland. As of 2000, there were 179 people who were single and never married in the village. There were 254 married individuals, 26 widows or widowers and 5 individuals who are divorced.

There were 54 households that consist of only one person and 7 households with five or more people. Out of a total of 196 households that answered this question, 27.6% were households made up of just one person and there was 1 adult who lived with their parents. Of the rest of the households, there are 53 married couples without children, 69 married couples with children There were 9 single parents with a child or children. There were 5 households that were made up of unrelated people and 5 households that were made up of some sort of institution or another collective housing.

In 2000 there were 163 single family homes (or 69.7% of the total) out of a total of 234 inhabited buildings. There were 55 multi-family buildings (23.5%), along with 11 multi-purpose buildings that were mostly used for housing (4.7%) and 5 other use buildings (commercial or industrial) that also had some housing (2.1%).

In 2000, a total of 187 apartments (57.9% of the total) were permanently occupied, while 107 apartments (33.1%) were seasonally occupied and 29 apartments (9.0%) were empty.

The historical population is given in the following chart:

== Politics ==
In the 2007 federal election the most popular party was the CVP which received 67.19% of the vote. The next three most popular parties were the SVP (17.67%), the SP (12.71%) and the FDP (1.22%). In the federal election, a total of 315 votes were cast, and the voter turnout was 75.0%.

== Economy ==
As of 2010, Bratsch had an unemployment rate of 0%. As of 2008, there were people employed in the primary economic sector and about businesses involved in this sector. No one was employed in the secondary sector or the tertiary sector. There were 223 residents of the village who were employed in some capacity, of which females made up 37.7% of the workforce.

In 2008 the total number of full-time equivalent jobs was 35. The number of jobs in the primary sector was 21, all of which were in agriculture. The number of jobs in the secondary sector was 4, all of which were in manufacturing. The number of jobs in the tertiary sector was 10. In the tertiary sector; 1 was in the sale or repair of motor vehicles, 1 was in the movement and storage of goods, 5 or 50.0% were in a hotel or restaurant, .

In 2000, there were 6 workers who commuted into the village and 211 workers who commuted away. The village is a net exporter of workers, with about 35.2 workers leaving the village for every one entering. Of the working population, % used public transportation to get to work, and % used a private car.

== Religion ==
From the 2000 census, 451 or 97.2% were Roman Catholic, while 10 or 2.2% belonged to the Swiss Reformed Church. 2 (or about 0.43% of the population) belonged to no church, are agnostic or atheist, and 1 individuals (or about 0.22% of the population) did not answer the question.

== Education ==
In Bratsch about 167 or (36.0%) of the population have completed non-mandatory upper secondary education, and 22 or (4.7%) have completed additional higher education (either University or a Fachhochschule). Of the 22 who completed tertiary schooling, 86.4% were Swiss men, 9.1% were Swiss women.

As of 2000, there were 64 students from Bratsch who attended schools outside the village.
