= List of cultural property of regional significance in Switzerland: Vaud =

This list contains all cultural property of regional significance (class B) in the canton of Vaud from the 2009 Swiss Inventory of Cultural Property of National and Regional Significance. It is sorted by municipality.

The geographic coordinates provided are in the Swiss coordinate system as given in the Inventory.

== Agiez ==
KGS No.^{?}	Picture	Name	Street Address	CH1903 X coordinate	CH1903 Y coordinate	Location
5888		Le Chenau Maison forte et rurale	Route de Bretonnieres 1	528.772	174.810	46.720685°N 6.506954°E

== Aigle ==
KGS No.^{?}	Picture	Name	Street Address	CH1903 X coordinate	CH1903 Y coordinate	Location
14544		Ancien Hôtel Beau-Site	Rue de la Gare 38	563.451	129.651	46.317263°N 6.964121°E
5891		Collège secondaire	Rue du Collège 12	563.975	129.800	46.318631°N 6.970912°E
14543		Cure catholique	Rue du Rhône 4	563.704	129.630	46.317088°N 6.967407°E
14546		Cure réformée	Avenue du Cloître 23	564.203	129.522	46.316143°N 6.973893°E
5892		Eglise catholique Saint-Maurice et Saint-Nicolas-de-Flue	Rue du Rhône 368	563.707	129.665	46.317403°N 6.967443°E
5893	Gare CFF	Gare CFF	Place de la Gare 1	563.425	129.600	46.316803°N 6.963787°E
14549		Maison avec dépendance et parc	Rue du Cloître 28	564.182	129.450	46.315494°N 6.973626°E
5894		Maison Dr Paul Anex	Chemin des Noyers 7	563.898	130.043	46.320813°N 6.969893°E
14548		Maison Farel	Rue Farel 10	563.807	129.706	46.317777°N 6.968738°E
14545		Maisons avec galeries	Rue de Jérusalem 1	563.821	129.822	46.318821°N 6.968911°E
14547		Villa Jaquerod	Avenue des Ormonts 14	564.126	129.678	46.317542°N 6.972882°E

== Allaman ==
KGS No.^{?}	Picture	Name	Street Address	CH1903 X coordinate	CH1903 Y coordinate	Location
5899	Château de Rochefort	Château de Rochefort	Place de l'Eglise 3	519.864	147.122	46.470627°N 6.395263°E
14550	Eglise réformée Saint-Jean-Baptiste	Eglise réformée Saint-Jean-Baptiste	Place de l'Eglise 2	519.878	147.144	46.470827°N 6.395442°E

== Assens ==
KGS No.^{?}	Picture	Name	Street Address	CH1903 X coordinate	CH1903 Y coordinate	Location
5904		Eglise catholique St-Germain	Route de la Riaz 110	537.600	162.581	46.611569°N 6.624078°E
14552		Espace culturel et musée de l'histoire estudiantine	Route du Moulin 7	537.833	162.895	46.614415°N 6.627077°E

== Aubonne ==
KGS No.^{?}	Picture	Name	Street Address	CH1903 X coordinate	CH1903 Y coordinate	Location
5912		Eglise réformée Saint-Etienne	Place du Temple 315	519.663	150.030	46.49676°N 6.392142°E
5909		Maison	Rue Tavernier 3	519.645	149.935	46.495904°N 6.391924°E

== Avenches ==
KGS No.^{?}	Picture	Name	Street Address	CH1903 X coordinate	CH1903 Y coordinate	Location
5919		Ancien Casino	Place du Casino 1	569.787	192.379	46.881842°N 7.042266°E
5922		Hôtel de Ville	Rue Centrale 33	569.660	192.150	46.879776°N 7.040615°E
5924	Tour de Bénenville	Tour de Bénenville	Rue des Alpes 262	569.705	192.108	46.879401°N 7.041209°E

== Ballaigues ==
KGS No.^{?}	Picture	Name	Street Address	CH1903 X coordinate	CH1903 Y coordinate	Location
10316		Ferme	Prés-des-Champs 246	521.124	177.058	46.740045°N 6.40654°E

== Bassins ==
KGS No.^{?}	Picture	Name	Street Address	CH1903 X coordinate	CH1903 Y coordinate	Location
5926	Eglise réformée Notre-Dame	Eglise réformée Notre-Dame	Au village 82	507.266	146.360	46.462149°N 6.231414°E

== Baulmes ==
KGS No.^{?}	Picture	Name	Street Address	CH1903 X coordinate	CH1903 Y coordinate	Location
5929	Eglise réformée Saint-Pierre	Eglise réformée Saint-Pierre	Au Village 31	529.727	182.610	46.790946°N 6.518248°E

== Bavois ==
KGS No.^{?}	Picture	Name	Street Address	CH1903 X coordinate	CH1903 Y coordinate	Location
5932	Château	Château	Route du Château 10	533.311	170.058	46.67841°N 6.567011°E
5933		Eglise réformée Saint-Léger	Au Village 115	533.200	170.840	46.685433°N 6.565446°E

== Begnins ==
KGS No.^{?}	Picture	Name	Street Address	CH1903 X coordinate	CH1903 Y coordinate	Location
5934	Château du Martheray	Château du Martheray	Rue de l'Eglise 2	508.700	143.910	46.440309°N 6.250562°E
5936	Eglise réformée Notre-Dame	Eglise réformée Notre-Dame	Rue de l'Eglise 255	508.772	143.963	46.440795°N 6.251488°E
5935	Manoir de Rochefort et ses dépendances	Manoir de Rochefort et ses dépendances	Rue de l'Eglise 6	508.814	143.897	46.440207°N 6.252048°E

== Bercher ==
KGS No.^{?}	Picture	Name	Street Address	CH1903 X coordinate	CH1903 Y coordinate	Location
5942		Château	Chemin de l'Eglise 10	544.569	171.981	46.696738°N 6.713912°E
14561		Cure	Chemin de l'Eglise 13	544.623	172.026	46.697147°N 6.714612°E
14560		Eglise réformée Saint-Michel	Chemin de l'Eglise 200	544.586	172.015	46.697045°N 6.71413°E
5943		Grenier	Près Humbert 239	543.596	171.578	46.693031°N 6.701241°E

== Bettens ==
KGS No.^{?}	Picture	Name	Street Address	CH1903 X coordinate	CH1903 Y coordinate	Location
5944	Château	Château	En la Riaz 57	533.991	164.359	46.627216°N 6.576716°E

== Bex ==
KGS No.^{?}	Picture	Name	Street Address	CH1903 X coordinate	CH1903 Y coordinate	Location
5949		Gare CFF	Avenue de la Gare 68	566.231	122.320	46.251462°N 7.000744°E
5950	Hôtel de Ville	Hôtel de Ville	Rue Centrale 8	567.233	122.282	46.25117°N 7.013739°E
14564	Les Dévens, "maison grise" du naturaliste Emmanuel Thomas	Les Dévens, "maison grise" du naturaliste Emmanuel Thomas	Les Dévens 1413	567.538	124.317	46.269491°N 7.017553°E
14565	Les Dévens, "maison rouge" des naturalistes Abraham et Emmanuel Thomas	Les Dévens, "maison rouge" des naturalistes Abraham et Emmanuel Thomas	Les Dévens 1412	567.520	124.327	46.26958°N 7.017318°E
5951	Les Dévens, ancienne maison du directeur des salines	Les Dévens, ancienne maison du directeur des salines	Route des Dévens 1408	567.520	124.385	46.270102°N 7.017314°E
14568	Maison	Maison	Les Dévens 1424	567.404	124.345	46.269736°N 7.015812°E
10671	Musée de la mine de sel de Bex	Musée de la mine de sel de Bex	Route des Mines de Sel 53	568.241	125.243	46.277854°N 7.026608°E

== Bonvillars ==
KGS No.^{?}	Picture	Name	Street Address	CH1903 X coordinate	CH1903 Y coordinate	Location
5958	Eglise réformée Saint-Nicolas	Eglise réformée Saint-Nicolas	Vers l'Eglise 139	541.548	187.939	46.840022°N 6.672379°E

== Bottens ==
KGS No.^{?}	Picture	Name	Street Address	CH1903 X coordinate	CH1903 Y coordinate	Location
5959	Eglise catholique St-Etienne avec son cimetière	Eglise catholique St-Etienne avec son cimetière	Les Placettes 12	540.322	163.556	46.620588°N 6.659482°E

== Bournens ==
KGS No.^{?}	Picture	Name	Street Address	CH1903 X coordinate	CH1903 Y coordinate	Location
5961	Château	Château	Route du Mont 2	532.929	161.734	46.603498°N 6.563232°E

== Bursinel ==
KGS No.^{?}	Picture	Name	Street Address	CH1903 X coordinate	CH1903 Y coordinate	Location
5963	Château	Château	Route du Château 1	513.030	143.880	46.440615°N 6.306905°E

== Bursins ==
KGS No.^{?}	Picture	Name	Street Address	CH1903 X coordinate	CH1903 Y coordinate	Location
5966	Château du Rosey	Château du Rosey	Chemin du Rosey 118	511.650	145.410	46.454196°N 6.288658°E
10318		Ferme	Grand Rue 14	511.737	145.130	46.451689°N 6.289844°E

== Chardonne ==
KGS No.^{?}	Picture	Name	Street Address	CH1903 X coordinate	CH1903 Y coordinate	Location
5973	Château	Château	Rue Jacques Chardonne 9	553.240	147.540	46.477548°N 6.829754°E
14581		Eglise réformée Saint-Jean-Baptiste	Au Village 293	553.022	147.457	46.476786°N 6.826924°E

== Cheseaux-sur-Lausanne ==
KGS No.^{?}	Picture	Name	Street Address	CH1903 X coordinate	CH1903 Y coordinate	Location
5992	Château d’En-bas	Château d’En-bas	Route de Genève 10	535.947	159.491	46.583618°N 6.602931°E

== Chevilly ==
KGS No.^{?}	Picture	Name	Street Address	CH1903 X coordinate	CH1903 Y coordinate	Location
10320		Moulin de Veyron	Près-du-Moulin 105	526.941	166.294	46.643887°N 6.484361°E

== Chexbres ==
KGS No.^{?}	Picture	Name	Street Address	CH1903 X coordinate	CH1903 Y coordinate	Location
5996		La Grande-Maison avec dépendance et fontaine	Grand-Rue 9	549.238	148.001	46.481403°N 6.777594°E
5997	Maison de Crousaz	Maison de Crousaz	Rue du Bourg-de-Crousaz 14	549.334	148.149	46.482742°N 6.778828°E

== Coinsins ==
KGS No.^{?}	Picture	Name	Street Address	CH1903 X coordinate	CH1903 Y coordinate	Location
5999		Château	Rue du Château 51	507.808	142.102	46.423925°N 6.239316°E

== Commugny ==
KGS No.^{?}	Picture	Name	Street Address	CH1903 X coordinate	CH1903 Y coordinate	Location
14590		Cure	Route de l'Eglise 18	503.073	130.613	46.31992°N 6.180126°E
6004		Eglise réformée Saint-Christophe	Devant-chez-Dussoix 22	503.107	130.640	46.320167°N 6.180561°E

== Concise ==
KGS No.^{?}	Picture	Name	Street Address	CH1903 X coordinate	CH1903 Y coordinate	Location
6008	Eglise réformée Saint-Jean-Baptiste	Eglise réformée Saint-Jean-Baptiste	Place de l'Eglise 1	545.190	189.000	46.849876°N 6.719993°E

== Coppet ==
KGS No.^{?}	Picture	Name	Street Address	CH1903 X coordinate	CH1903 Y coordinate	Location
6012		Maison de Mézières	Grand-Rue 63	504.117	130.186	46.316229°N 6.193767°E
14591		Musée de Coppet-Maison Michel	Grand-Rue 30	504.067	130.202	46.316366°N 6.193114°E
10673		Musée du château	Rue de la Gare 2	503.978	130.281	46.317063°N 6.191943°E

== Corseaux ==
KGS No.^{?}	Picture	Name	Street Address	CH1903 X coordinate	CH1903 Y coordinate	Location
14593		Villa Sartoris	Chemin d'entre-Deux-Ville 7	553.838	146.732	46.470321°N 6.837621°E

== Cossonay ==
KGS No.^{?}	Picture	Name	Street Address	CH1903 X coordinate	CH1903 Y coordinate	Location
6026		Ancien Hôtel du Cerf	Rue du Temple 10	528.771	162.962	46.614114°N 6.508777°E
14599		Archives communales	Rue Neuve 1	528.647	162.935	46.613858°N 6.507163°E
14772		Archives de la maison Sartoris	Rue des Bons Enfants 11	528.675	162.974	46.614211°N 6.507522°E
6028		Maison Sartoris	Rue des Bons Enfants 11	528.675	162.974	46.614211°N 6.507522°E
10321	Tuilerie	Tuilerie	La Tuilière 372	527.745	163.414	46.618069°N 6.495314°E

== Cuarnens ==
KGS No.^{?}	Picture	Name	Street Address	CH1903 X coordinate	CH1903 Y coordinate	Location
6032	Scierie et moulin sur la Venoge	Scierie et moulin sur la Venoge	Route de l'Isle 88	522.900	164.400	46.626397°N 6.431902°E

== Cudrefin ==
KGS No.^{?}	Picture	Name	Street Address	CH1903 X coordinate	CH1903 Y coordinate	Location
14601		Montet Cure	Chemin Derrière-les-Vignes 1	568.689	199.890	46.949354°N 7.027345°E
6035	Montet, Eglise réformée Saint-Théodule	Montet, Eglise réformée Saint-Théodule	Sous-le-Temple 209	568.739	199.898	46.949428°N 7.028002°E
6037		Tour des remparts	Grand'Rue 58	568.109	200.533	46.95511°N 7.019682°E

== Curtilles ==
KGS No.^{?}	Picture	Name	Street Address	CH1903 X coordinate	CH1903 Y coordinate	Location
6046	Eglise réformée Notre-Dame	Eglise réformée Notre-Dame	Au Village 217	554.800	172.560	46.702717°N 6.847613°E

== Daillens ==
KGS No.^{?}	Picture	Name	Street Address	CH1903 X coordinate	CH1903 Y coordinate	Location
14604	Cure	Cure	Rue du Château 2	531.832	163.538	46.619614°N 6.548648°E

== Denens ==
KGS No.^{?}	Picture	Name	Street Address	CH1903 X coordinate	CH1903 Y coordinate	Location
6049	Château	Château	Ruelle du Château 5	524.800	152.275	46.51755°N 6.458685°E
14605		Habitation et rural	Chemin de Chapallaz 2	524.810	152.340	46.518136°N 6.458805°E

== Donneloye ==
KGS No.^{?}	Picture	Name	Street Address	CH1903 X coordinate	CH1903 Y coordinate	Location
6052	Manoir avec tour-colombier	Manoir avec tour-colombier	Chemin du Château 4	544.787	177.329	46.744862°N 6.716118°E

== Échallens ==
KGS No.^{?}	Picture	Name	Street Address	CH1903 X coordinate	CH1903 Y coordinate	Location
6056	Château	Château	Place du Château 4	538.115	165.917	46.641625°N 6.630352°E
6057	Hôtel de Ville	Hôtel de Ville	Place de l'Hôtel de Ville 76	538.250	165.920	46.641664°N 6.632115°E
6058		Hôtel des Balances	Au Village 24	538.458	166.984	46.651254°N 6.634689°E
6059		Maison Bezançon	Grand'Rue 13	538.290	165.887	46.641371°N 6.632642°E
6060		Temple	Au Village 152	538.400	165.825	46.640823°N 6.634086°E

== Echandens ==
KGS No.^{?}	Picture	Name	Street Address	CH1903 X coordinate	CH1903 Y coordinate	Location
6061	Château	Château	Rue du Château 10	531.233	154.211	46.535656°N 6.54222°E

== Epalinges ==
KGS No.^{?}	Picture	Name	Street Address	CH1903 X coordinate	CH1903 Y coordinate	Location
6067		Temple des Croisettes	Les Croisettes 278	541.325	155.250	46.545963°N 6.673633°E

== Faoug ==
KGS No.^{?}	Picture	Name	Street Address	CH1903 X coordinate	CH1903 Y coordinate	Location
14630		Péage et maison du commis	Route de Morat 29	572.985	195.644	46.911349°N 7.084027°E

== Genolier ==
KGS No.^{?}	Picture	Name	Street Address	CH1903 X coordinate	CH1903 Y coordinate	Location
14632		Cure	Route de Trélex 10	506.082	143.330	46.43473°N 6.216617°E

== Giez ==
KGS No.^{?}	Picture	Name	Street Address	CH1903 X coordinate	CH1903 Y coordinate	Location
6078	Château	Château	Route en Pierre 36	537.180	184.580	46.809411°N 6.615584°E

== Gilly ==
KGS No.^{?}	Picture	Name	Street Address	CH1903 X coordinate	CH1903 Y coordinate	Location
6083		Château St-Vincent avec parc	Rue Saint-Vicent 7	511.856	145.539	46.455383°N 6.291314°E

== Gingins ==
KGS No.^{?}	Picture	Name	Street Address	CH1903 X coordinate	CH1903 Y coordinate	Location
10324		Chalet d'alpage de La Barillette	La Barillette 230	499.116	142.960	46.430391°N 6.126076°E
14633		Château	Rue de l'Eglise 10	503.222	140.547	46.409292°N 6.179991°E
14634		Cure	Rue de l'Eglise 9	503.196	140.595	46.40972°N 6.179643°E
6084		Moulin de Chiblins	Route de Chiblins 61	504.031	139.944	46.403985°N 6.190636°E
14773		Musée romand de la machine agricole dans le Moulin de Chiblins	Route de Chiblins 61	504.031	139.944	46.403985°N 6.190636°E

== Gland ==
KGS No.^{?}	Picture	Name	Street Address	CH1903 X coordinate	CH1903 Y coordinate	Location
14801		Lignes de fortification et villa rose	Route Suisse 10	510.255	140.310	46.408138°N 6.27149°E
6086		Villa Prangins	Route du Domaine Impériale 42	510.990	139.120	46.397532°N 6.281276°E

== Grancy ==
KGS No.^{?}	Picture	Name	Street Address	CH1903 X coordinate	CH1903 Y coordinate	Location
6091	Château avec dépendances	Château avec dépendances	Route de Senarclens 8	525.535	160.540	46.591975°N 6.466929°E

== Grandson ==
KGS No.^{?}	Picture	Name	Street Address	CH1903 X coordinate	CH1903 Y coordinate	Location
6096	Ancien Hôtel de Ville	Ancien Hôtel de Ville	Rue Haute 25	539.298	184.422	46.808186°N 6.643353°E
14641		Cure	Rue Haute 23	539.331	184.429	46.808252°N 6.643784°E
6101	Maison du Bailli	Maison du Bailli	Rue Haute 9	539.390	184.480	46.808716°N 6.64455°E
6102		Maison gothique	Rue Haute 26	539.366	184.489	46.808795°N 6.644235°E
14642		Maison gothique	Rue Haute 30	539.353	184.484	46.808749°N 6.644065°E
14643		Maison gothique	Rue Haute 32	539.344	184.483	46.808739°N 6.643947°E
8695		Musée régional et musée de l'automobile dans le Château	Place du Château 14	539.582	184.584	46.809669°N 6.647052°E
6103	Tour des Cordeliers	Tour des Cordeliers	Rue Basse 57	539.282	184.274	46.806853°N 6.643163°E

== Gryon ==
KGS No.^{?}	Picture	Name	Street Address	CH1903 X coordinate	CH1903 Y coordinate	Location
14608		Eglise réformée Saint-Jean	Le Vieux-Chemin 7	571.031	124.745	46.2735°N 7.062835°E

== Jouxtens-Mézery ==
KGS No.^{?}	Picture	Name	Street Address	CH1903 X coordinate	CH1903 Y coordinate	Location
6114		Mézery Castle	Chemin de Mézery 19			
6113		Maison Rivier	Chemin de Champvent 13			

== La Rippe ==
KGS No.^{?}	Picture	Name	Street Address	CH1903 X coordinate	CH1903 Y coordinate	Location
14610		Tour de l'horloge	Route de la Scie 1	500.933	137.511	46.381651°N 6.150875°E

== La Sarraz ==
KGS No.^{?}	Picture	Name	Street Address	CH1903 X coordinate	CH1903 Y coordinate	Location
9366		Bibliothèque du château de La Sarraz	Rue du Château 178	529.241	168.101	46.660388°N 6.514122°E
8725	Musée du cheval dans le château de La Sarraz	Musée du cheval dans le château de La Sarraz	Rue du Château 176	529.307	168.073	46.660144°N 6.514988°E
8724		Musée romand dans le château de La Sarraz	Rue du Château 178	529.241	168.101	46.660388°N 6.514122°E
14613		Temple	Grand-Rue 162	529.274	168.001	46.659492°N 6.514568°E

== La Tour-de-Peilz ==
KGS No.^{?}	Picture	Name	Street Address	CH1903 X coordinate	CH1903 Y coordinate	Location
6504	Château de la Becque avec écurie	Château de la Becque avec écurie	Route de St-Maurice 74	555.600	144.360	46.449103°N 6.860788°E
14622		Château de Sully	Route de Chailly 144	556.725	144.390	46.449446°N 6.875426°E
6499		Château, tour, remparts et fossés	Rue du Château 11	555.140	144.750	46.45258°N 6.854764°E
14619	Eglise réformée Saint-Théodule	Eglise réformée Saint-Théodule	Place du temple 498	555.313	144.858	46.453564°N 6.857005°E
14617		Ensemble résidentiel de Bellaria	Avenue de Sully 82	555.876	144.413	46.449598°N 6.864375°E
14620	La Doges. Maison de maître avec son rural, sa tour, ses pavillons d'entrée et son parc	La Doges. Maison de maître avec son rural, sa tour, ses pavillons d'entrée et son parc	Chemin des Bulesses 154	556.647	145.174	46.456494°N 6.874338°E
14621		La Faraz. Maison de maître et son parc	Chemin des Vignes 46	556.273	144.975	46.454679°N 6.869489°E
10680		Le Musée Suisse du Jeu dans le château	Rue du Château 11	555.140	144.750	46.45258°N 6.854764°E
14615	Résidence Rive-Reine avec annexe	Résidence Rive-Reine avec annexe	Route de St-Maurice 54	555.503	144.417	46.449609°N 6.85952°E
14618		Villa Ma Maison avec parc et dépendance	Route de Saint-Maurice 178	556.160	144.290	46.44851°N 6.868083°E

== Lausanne ==
KGS No.^{?}	Picture	Name	Street Address	CH1903 X coordinate	CH1903 Y coordinate	Location
6196	Pont Bessières	Pont Bessières				
14654		Centre international de recherche sur l’anarchisme (CIRA)	Avenue de Beaumont 24	539.137	153.086	46.526302°N 6.645393°E
6149	Chapelle de Guillaume Tell	Chapelle de Guillaume Tell	Allée Paul-Budry	537.586	152.507	46.520951°N 6.625259°E
6205		Tour de l’Ale	Rue de la Tour	537.774	152.839	46.523955°N 6.627664°E
6209		Villa du Bois-de-Vaux	Chemin du Bois-de-Vaux 19	535.828	152.565	46.521307°N 6.602342°E
6208		Villa du Denantou	Chemin Édouard-Sandoz 3	538.599	151.000	46.507489°N 6.638659°E
6181		Maison Porta	Rue Cité-Derrière 4	538.410	152.629	46.522125°N 6.63598°E
6152	Château de Valency	Château de Valency				

== Leysin ==
KGS No.^{?}	Picture	Name	Street Address	CH1903 X coordinate	CH1903 Y coordinate	Location
6215		Clinique "manufacture" du Dr Rollier	Route du Belvédère 75	566.960	132.565	46.343657°N 7.00947°E

== Lonay ==
KGS No.^{?}	Picture	Name	Street Address	CH1903 X coordinate	CH1903 Y coordinate	Location
14662		Roman-Dessous, maison de maître et dépendance	Route de Roman 21	528.900	153.100	46.525419°N 6.511981°E
6218		Roman-Dessous, maison de maître et dépendances	Route de Roman 25	528.871	153.084	46.525272°N 6.511606°E
14664		Roman-Dessus, maison de maître et dépendances	Route de Roman 10	529.018	153.154	46.525917°N 6.513511°E
14663		Roman-Dessus, maison vigneronne et dépendance	Route de Roman 14	528.992	153.136	46.525753°N 6.513175°E

== Lucens ==
KGS No.^{?}	Picture	Name	Street Address	CH1903 X coordinate	CH1903 Y coordinate	Location
6221		Musée Sherlock Holmes	Rue des Gréniers 7	554.098	173.385	46.710091°N 6.838352°E

== Lutry ==
KGS No.^{?}	Picture	Name	Street Address	CH1903 X coordinate	CH1903 Y coordinate	Location
14666		Cure	Place du Temple 2	542.313	150.424	46.502638°N 6.687117°E
6227		Maison d'Ernst	Grand-Rue 52	542.258	150.352	46.501986°N 6.686409°E
6228		Savuit, la balance	Rue du Village 9	542.760	150.890	46.506868°N 6.692882°E
6229		Tour Bertholod	Chemin de Bertholod 374	542.700	150.440	46.502815°N 6.692156°E

== Mathod ==
KGS No.^{?}	Picture	Name	Street Address	CH1903 X coordinate	CH1903 Y coordinate	Location
6232		Maison Marendaz	Rue de la Forge 25	533.300	179.745	46.765543°N 6.565458°E

== Mont-sur-Rolle ==
KGS No.^{?}	Picture	Name	Street Address	CH1903 X coordinate	CH1903 Y coordinate	Location
14677		Maison de maître de Belletruche	Route de Germagny 2	515.100	147.118	46.470005°N 6.333244°E
14678		Maison de maître de Germagny	Route de Germagny 7	514.957	146.809	46.467207°N 6.33144°E

== Montherod ==
KGS No.^{?}	Picture	Name	Street Address	CH1903 X coordinate	CH1903 Y coordinate	Location
14668	Musée du bois-Arboretum	Musée du bois-Arboretum	Chemin de Plan 92	517.744	151.656	46.511153°N 6.366858°E

== Montreux ==
KGS No.^{?}	Picture	Name	Street Address	CH1903 X coordinate	CH1903 Y coordinate	Location
8956		Archives communales	Avenue Alexandre-Vinet 8	558.264	143.510	46.441628°N 6.895535°E
6247		Chamby, Grand-Hôtel des Narcisses	Route de Villard 2	559.669	144.403	46.449747°N 6.913739°E
6252		Clarens, quartier des villas du Bochet	Rue du Lac / Villas du Bochet 181	557.640	143.561	46.442048°N 6.88741°E
6253		Clarens, Villa Ormond	Rue du Lac 18	558.715	143.460	46.441206°N 6.901408°E
6254		Eglise catholique	Rue de l'Eglise catholique 14	559.579	142.293	46.430761°N 6.912752°E
6268		Eglise réformée Saint-Vincent et ancien ossuaire	Rue du Temple 5278	560.040	142.360	46.431391°N 6.918744°E
14675		Ensemble résidentiel de Bon-Port	Avenue de la Riviera 22	559.960	142.265	46.430532°N 6.917711°E
6259		Glion, Clinique de Valmont	Route de Valmont 22	560.972	141.777	46.426202°N 6.930918°E
6260		Glion, Hôtel du Righi vaudois et son parc	Route de Champ-Fleuri 3	560.475	142.630	46.433846°N 6.92438°E
6261		Glion, Hôtel Victoria	Route de Caux 16	560.640	142.380	46.431607°N 6.926548°E
6262	Hôtel Eden	Hôtel Eden	Rue du Théâtre 11	559.360	142.260	46.430451°N 6.909906°E
6263		Hôtel Excelsior	Rue de Bon-Port 27	560.102	142.127	46.429299°N 6.91957°E
6265		Hôtel Suisse et Majestic	Avenue des Alpes 45	559.350	142.850	46.435758°N 6.909724°E
8958	Musée historique de Montreux et de sa région	Musée historique de Montreux et de sa région	Rue de la Gare 40	559.650	142.657	46.43404°N 6.913644°E
6267	Pavillon des Sports du Palace	Pavillon des Sports du Palace	Grand-Rue 85	559.150	143.060	46.437635°N 6.907103°E
6269		Territet, église St. John's	Avenue de Chillon 92	560.375	141.848	46.426806°N 6.923146°E
14674		Territet, Hôtel Villa Germaine	Rue de Collonge 1	560.562	141.335	46.422202°N 6.925622°E
6270		Territet, Institut Monte-Rosa	Avenue de Chillon 57	560.526	141.356	46.422389°N 6.925152°E
6271		Vernex, Villa Toscane	Rue du Lac 2	558.854	143.384	46.440531°N 6.903223°E
6272	Villa Florentine	Villa Florentine	Grand-Rue 83	559.207	143.019	46.437269°N 6.907848°E

== Montricher ==
KGS No.^{?}	Picture	Name	Street Address	CH1903 X coordinate	CH1903 Y coordinate	Location
6273	Eglise réformée, ancienne chapelle probabl. Saint-Nicolas	Eglise réformée, ancienne chapelle probabl. Saint-Nicolas	Au Château 43	518.642	161.655	46.601201°N 6.376794°E

== Morrens ==
KGS No.^{?}	Picture	Name	Street Address	CH1903 X coordinate	CH1903 Y coordinate	Location
6300	Saint Nicolas reformed church	Saint Nicolas reformed church	Chemin de l'église	537.782	160.306	46.591122°N 6.626761°E
14685	Presbytery	Presbytery	Chemin de l'église	537.777	160.324	46.591284°N 6.626693°E
14686	Maison de Commune (1696)	Maison de Commune (1696)		537.731	160.346	46.591477°N 6.62609°E

== Penthaz ==
KGS No.^{?}	Picture	Name	Street Address	CH1903 X coordinate	CH1903 Y coordinate	Location
6408	Reformed Church of Saint-Maurice	Reformed Church of Saint-Maurice	Rue du Four	531.070	161.401	46.600314°N 6.539021°E

== Prilly ==
KGS No.^{?}	Picture	Name	Street Address	CH1903 X coordinate	CH1903 Y coordinate	Location
10595	Archives communales de Prilly	Archives communales de Prilly	Rue Cossonay	536.063	154.103	46.535164°N 6.605191°E

== Puidoux ==
KGS No.^{?}	Picture	Name	Street Address	CH1903 X coordinate	CH1903 Y coordinate	Location
6418	Dézaley, Clos des Abbayes et ses dépendances	Dézaley, Clos des Abbayes et ses dépendances	Le Dézaley 716	548.152	147.829	46.479773°N 6.763471°E
6419		Gare CFF	Route de la Gare 7	548.333	149.389	46.49382°N 6.765654°E
6420	Tour de Marsens	Tour de Marsens	La Chapotannaz 647	547.496	148.840	46.488816°N 6.754815°E

== Pully ==
KGS No.^{?}	Picture	Name	Street Address	CH1903 X coordinate	CH1903 Y coordinate	Location
6422		Ancienne maison du Général Guisan	Av. du Général Guisan 117	539.080	150.861	46.506283°N 6.644944°E
8887		Archives communales	Rue de la Poste 1	540.329	151.226	46.509678°N 6.661168°E
14723		Musée dans l'ancienne maison du Général Guisan	Avenue du Général Guisan 117	539.080	150.861	46.506283°N 6.644944°E
14724		Musée de Pully	Chemin de Davel 2	540.273	151.147	46.508963°N 6.660449°E

== Rennaz ==
KGS No.^{?}	Picture	Name	Street Address	CH1903 X coordinate	CH1903 Y coordinate	Location
6427		Château du Grand-Clos avec fontaine	Route du Village 32	560.050	135.995	46.374136°N 6.919422°E
14730		Ferme du Grand Clos	Route du Village 36	560.023	135.972	46.373928°N 6.919073°E

== Rolle ==
KGS No.^{?}	Picture	Name	Street Address	CH1903 X coordinate	CH1903 Y coordinate	Location
6433		Ancien Hôtel de la Couronne	Grand-Rue 44	515.540	145.870	46.458835°N 6.3392°E
6434		Ancienne maison d'Allinges	Grand-Rue 50	515.515	145.835	46.458517°N 6.338881°E
6435		Bellerive	Route de Genève 26	514.775	145.075	46.451587°N 6.32939°E
6436		Casino	Rue du Port 15	515.350	145.472	46.455231°N 6.3368°E
6439		Institut Le Rosey	Le Rosey 1	514.586	145.862	46.458642°N 6.326785°E
6440		Les Uttins, maison de maître et maison paysanne	Route de Genève 2	515.253	145.551	46.455929°N 6.335523°E
6442		Temple	Rue du Temple 355	515.317	145.840	46.458537°N 6.336303°E

== Ropraz ==
KGS No.^{?}	Picture	Name	Street Address	CH1903 X coordinate	CH1903 Y coordinate	Location
6454		Château d' Ussières	Ussières 89	547.660	161.330	46.60118°N 6.755535°E

== Rougemont ==
KGS No.^{?}	Picture	Name	Street Address	CH1903 X coordinate	CH1903 Y coordinate	Location
14734	Archives communales	Archives communales	Route de la Croisette 16	582.488	148.835	46.4906°N 7.210552°E
6461	Château et ses dépendances	Château et ses dépendances	Le Château 270	582.160	148.470	46.487308°N 7.206295°E
14733	Cure	Cure	Route de Flendruz 20	581.940	148.488	46.487464°N 7.203429°E
10352		Habitation	Les Palettes 464	581.193	148.433	46.486948°N 7.193702°E

== Rovray ==
KGS No.^{?}	Picture	Name	Street Address	CH1903 X coordinate	CH1903 Y coordinate	Location
10353		Maison de maître et son rural	Rue du Four 17	548.450	181.770	46.785102°N 6.76355°E

== Sainte-Croix ==
KGS No.^{?}	Picture	Name	Street Address	CH1903 X coordinate	CH1903 Y coordinate	Location
14738		Archives communales	Rue Neuve 10	528.464	186.126	46.822437°N 6.501157°E
10681		L'Auberson, Musée Baud	Grand-Rue 23	526.160	185.823	46.81946°N 6.471015°E
14736		Maison, Musée des arts et des sciences	Avenue des Alpes 10	528.652	185.989	46.821225°N 6.503642°E
14737		Musée des arts et des sciences	Avenue des Alpes 10	528.652	185.989	46.821225°N 6.503642°E
6479		Temple	Place du Temple 163	528.627	186.179	46.822932°N 6.503285°E
6480		Vers-chez-Jaccard, ferme bernoise	Vers-chez-Jaccard 8	529.340	185.790	46.819509°N 6.512688°E

== Saint-Prex ==
KGS No.^{?}	Picture	Name	Street Address	CH1903 X coordinate	CH1903 Y coordinate	Location
6486	Château	Château	Quai du Suchet / Rue de la Tour 3	524.900	148.120	46.480188°N 6.460663°E
6487	Manoir Forel	Manoir Forel	Rue Forel 15	524.890	147.960	46.478747°N 6.460559°E
14742		Musée du verrier	Rue de la Verrerie 2	524.434	148.459	46.483185°N 6.45454°E
6488	Porte de ville avec tour d'horloge et vestiges du rempart	Porte de ville avec tour d'horloge et vestiges du rempart	Rue du Pont-Levis 102	524.808	148.082	46.479836°N 6.459471°E

== Saint-Saphorin ==
KGS No.^{?}	Picture	Name	Street Address	CH1903 X coordinate	CH1903 Y coordinate	Location
6491	Château de Glérolles	Château de Glérolles				

== Senarclens ==
KGS No.^{?}	Picture	Name	Street Address	CH1903 X coordinate	CH1903 Y coordinate	Location
6472		Château	Route de Gollion 62	527.455	161.233	46.59842°N 6.491871°E

== Sullens ==
KGS No.^{?}	Picture	Name	Street Address	CH1903 X coordinate	CH1903 Y coordinate	Location
14745		Ancienne dépendance du château	Rue du château 8	533.220	160.672	46.593974°N 6.567184°E
14744		Château avec dépendance	Rue du Château 6	533.193	160.674	46.59399°N 6.566831°E
14743		Fontaine	Au Village 71	533.206	160.696	46.594189°N 6.566998°E
6494		Temple	Au Village 72	533.220	160.704	46.594262°N 6.567179°E

== Trelex ==
KGS No.^{?}	Picture	Name	Street Address	CH1903 X coordinate	CH1903 Y coordinate	Location
14748	Tour de l'Horloge	Tour de l'Horloge	Au Village 149	505.123	141.125	46.414762°N 6.204592°E

== Treytorrens ==
KGS No.^{?}	Picture	Name	Street Address	CH1903 X coordinate	CH1903 Y coordinate	Location
14749	Château	Château	Chemin du Château 6	551.299	180.208	46.771266°N 6.801024°E

== Valeyres-sous-Rances ==
KGS No.^{?}	Picture	Name	Street Address	CH1903 X coordinate	CH1903 Y coordinate	Location
6510		Ancienne dîme	Route de la Robellaz 1	529.964	178.359	46.752734°N 6.522002°E
6511		Château avec ses dépendances	Rue du Manoir 19	530.448	178.519	46.754224°N 6.528312°E
14752	Eglise réformée Saint-Jacques	Eglise réformée Saint-Jacques	Sur le Moti 181	529.750	178.264	46.751857°N 6.519216°E

== Vallorbe ==
KGS No.^{?}	Picture	Name	Street Address	CH1903 X coordinate	CH1903 Y coordinate	Location
10687		Musée du fer et du chemin de fer	Rue des Grandes-Forges 11	519.091	173.998	46.712278°N 6.380481°E
14754		Villa de M. Grobet	Rue du Tercasset 30	518.755	174.163	46.713721°N 6.376058°E

== Vevey ==
KGS No.^{?}	Picture	Name	Street Address	CH1903 X coordinate	CH1903 Y coordinate	Location
6520		Ancien Hôtel Moser avec dépendances et parc	Boulevard Herni-Plumhof 3	555.041	145.834	46.462325°N 6.85337°E
6537		Ancienne maison de la Part-Dieu	Rue d'Italie 2	554.954	145.349	46.457956°N 6.852285°E
8957		Archives communales	Rue du Lac 2	554.522	145.473	46.459042°N 6.84665°E
9372		Bibliothèque municipale	Quai Perdonnet 33	554.384	145.399	46.458367°N 6.844861°E
6522	Casino du Rivage	Casino du Rivage	Rue Louis-Meyer 1	554.074	145.549	46.459696°N 6.840811°E
6524		Collège	Rue du Collège 30	554.595	145.495	46.459245°N 6.847598°E
14757		Collège de la Veveyse	Rue du Torrent 27	553.924	145.729	46.461304°N 6.83884°E
6526		Ecole du Clos	Rue du Clos 15	554.468	145.691	46.461°N 6.845925°E
6527		Eglise anglaise	Route de Blonay 4	554.811	145.582	46.460043°N 6.850401°E
6529		Eglise Sainte-Claire	Rue du Collège 691	554.634	145.473	46.45905°N 6.848108°E
6531		Gare	Place de la Gare 3	554.275	145.900	46.462867°N 6.843393°E
6535		Hôtel du Lac	Rue d'Italie 1	554.931	145.306	46.457568°N 6.85199°E
8764		Musée historique de Vevey	Rue du Château / Rue d'Italie 2	554.685	145.391	46.458316°N 6.848779°E
6541		Théâtre municipal	Rue du Théâtre 4	554.254	145.648	46.460598°N 6.843144°E

== Veytaux ==
KGS No.^{?}	Picture	Name	Street Address	CH1903 X coordinate	CH1903 Y coordinate	Location
10676		Musée du château de Chillon	Avenue de Chillon 21	560.701	140.447	46.414222°N 6.927505°E

== Villarzel ==
KGS No.^{?}	Picture	Name	Street Address	CH1903 X coordinate	CH1903 Y coordinate	Location
14762		Eglise réformée Saint-Georges	En la Ville 3	560.121	178.014	46.752117°N 6.916713°E
6549		Maison Bize avec fenêtres en triplet	Impasse En la Ville 27	559.978	177.861	46.750732°N 6.914854°E

== Vinzel ==
KGS No.^{?}	Picture	Name	Street Address	CH1903 X coordinate	CH1903 Y coordinate	Location
6558		Château La Bâtie	Rue du Collège 23	510.714	144.848	46.449017°N 6.276585°E

== Vuarrens ==
KGS No.^{?}	Picture	Name	Street Address	CH1903 X coordinate	CH1903 Y coordinate	Location
6559	Eglise réformée Notre-Dame	Eglise réformée Notre-Dame	Derray-le-Motty 126	539.528	170.978	46.687278°N 6.64814°E

== Vufflens-la-Ville ==
KGS No.^{?}	Picture	Name	Street Address	CH1903 X coordinate	CH1903 Y coordinate	Location
6560		Eglise réformée Saint-Etienne	Grand-Rue 21	531.014	158.801	46.576921°N 6.538679°E

== Yverdon-les-Bains ==
KGS No.^{?}	Picture	Name	Street Address	CH1903 X coordinate	CH1903 Y coordinate	Location
6570		Ancienne maison Crinsoz de Givrins	Rue du Four 18	538.973	181.143	46.778662°N 6.639533°E
6572		Ancienne maison de Mandrot	Rue du Lac 48	538.878	181.330	46.780335°N 6.638264°E
6584		Anciennes casernes avec tour d'enceinte et arsenal	Rue des Moulins 152	538.760	181.260	46.779695°N 6.636728°E
11693		Anciennes prisons, Maison d'ailleurs	Place Pestalozzi 14	539.161	181.143	46.778679°N 6.641994°E
8885		Archives communales	Place Pestalozzi 1	539.051	181.110	46.778372°N 6.640558°E
6573		Collège	Place d'Armes 1983	538.908	181.438	46.781309°N 6.638642°E
6581		Hôtel des Bains avec rotonde, orangerie et fontaine	Avenue des Bains 22	539.739	180.288	46.771041°N 6.649675°E
6574		Maison Constançon, ancienne maison Bourgeois	Rue du Four 23	538.923	181.111	46.778369°N 6.638882°E
6576		Maison Gonset, ancienne maison Haldimand	Rue du Lac 4	539.050	181.195	46.779137°N 6.640534°E
6577	Maison Piguet, ancienne maison Roguin	Maison Piguet, ancienne maison Roguin	Rue de la Plaine 14	539.220	181.015	46.777533°N 6.642784°E
6578		Maison Vaucher, ancienne maison Russillion	Rue du Four 25	538.886	181.132	46.778555°N 6.638395°E
6579		Nouveau Casino	Rue du Casino 9	539.181	181.275	46.779868°N 6.642238°E

== See also ==
- Swiss Inventory of Cultural Property of National and Regional Significance, 2009 edition:

- PDF documents: Class A objects
- PDF documents: Class B objects

- List of cultural property of national significance in Switzerland: Vaud
