= List of cultural property of national significance in Switzerland: Valais =

This list contains all cultural property of national significance (class A) in the canton of Valais from the 2009 Swiss Inventory of Cultural Property of National and Regional Significance. It is sorted by municipality and contains 58 individual buildings, 16 collections, 15 archaeological finds and 2 other, special sites or objects.

The geographic coordinates provided are in the Swiss coordinate system as given in the Inventory.

== Albinen ==
KGS No.^{?}	Picture	Name	Street Address	CH1903 X coordinate	CH1903 Y coordinate	Location
Unknown		ISOS Dorf: Albinen				

== Anniviers ==
KGS No.^{?}	Picture	Name	Street Address	CH1903 X coordinate	CH1903 Y coordinate	Location
9699	Ilôt Bosquet / Chlasche	Ilôt Bosquet / Chlasche	Grimentz	610.100	113.250	46.170644°N 7.569413°E
Unknown		ISOS village: Ayer				
Unknown		ISOS village: Grimentz				
Unknown		ISOS village: Saint-Jean				
Unknown		ISOS village: Vissoie				
Unknown		ISOS hameau: Pinsec				

== Bellwald ==
KGS No.^{?}	Picture	Name	Street Address	CH1903 X coordinate	CH1903 Y coordinate	Location
Unknown		ISOS Weiler: Bodma				

== Bettmeralp ==
KGS No.^{?}	Picture	Name	Street Address	CH1903 X coordinate	CH1903 Y coordinate	Location
Unknown		ISOS Weiler: Eggen				

== Binn ==
KGS No.^{?}	Picture	Name	Street Address	CH1903 X coordinate	CH1903 Y coordinate	Location
6629	Bogenbrücke (Bridge) with the Chapel of St. Anton	Bogenbrücke (Bridge) with the Chapel of St. Anton	Bei der Brücke	657.358	135.005	46.363969°N 8.183964°E
Unknown		ISOS Dorf: Schmidigehischere				
Unknown		ISOS Weiler: Fäld				

== Bitsch ==
KGS No.^{?}	Picture	Name	Street Address	CH1903 X coordinate	CH1903 Y coordinate	Location
Unknown		ISOS Weiler: Wasen				

== Blatten ==
KGS No.^{?}	Picture	Name	Street Address	CH1903 X coordinate	CH1903 Y coordinate	Location
Unknown		ISOS Dorf: Blatten				
Unknown		ISOS Weiler: Eisten				
Unknown		ISOS Weiler: Weissenried				

== Bourg-Saint-Pierre ==
KGS No.^{?}	Picture	Name	Street Address	CH1903 X coordinate	CH1903 Y coordinate	Location
6648	Church of St-Pierre with romanesque Tower	Church of St-Pierre with romanesque Tower		582.130	088.640	45.949106°N 7.208191°E
6649	Hospice with outbuildings library, museum and archives	Hospice with outbuildings library, museum and archives	Col du Grand Saint-Bernard	579.196	079.752	45.869073°N 7.170747°E
Unknown		ISOS petite City / bourg: Bourg-Saint-Pierre				
Unknown		ISOS cas particulier: Grand-Saint-Bernard				

== Brig-Glis ==
KGS No.^{?}	Picture	Name	Street Address	CH1903 X coordinate	CH1903 Y coordinate	Location
6661	Old and New Stockalperpalast	Old and New Stockalperpalast	Alte Simplonstrasse 28	642.520	129.468	46.315265°N 7.990656°E
6659		Gamsenmauer	Talsperre	639.240	128.000	46.30226°N 7.947951°E
6660	Church of Mariä Himmelfahrt with Ossuary	Church of Mariä Himmelfahrt with Ossuary		641.550	128.950	46.310666°N 7.978018°E
Unknown		ISOS Stadt: Brig-Glis				

== Bürchen ==
KGS No.^{?}	Picture	Name	Street Address	CH1903 X coordinate	CH1903 Y coordinate	Location
Unknown		ISOS Spezialfall:Turtig/Wandfluh shared between Bürchen, Raron, Unterbäch				

== Chamoson ==
KGS No.^{?}	Picture	Name	Street Address	CH1903 X coordinate	CH1903 Y coordinate	Location
6682	Church of St-Pierre and Priory	Church of St-Pierre and Priory	Rue De L’Eglise	584.460	115.650	46.19213°N 7.237345°E
Unknown		ISOS village: Saint-Pierre de Clages				

== Conthey ==
KGS No.^{?}	Picture	Name	Street Address	CH1903 X coordinate	CH1903 Y coordinate	Location
Unknown		ISOS cas particulier: Conthey-Bourg / Saint-Séverin				

== Crans-Montana ==
KGS No.^{?}	Picture	Name	Street Address	CH1903 X coordinate	CH1903 Y coordinate	Location
6853	Fairy Rock Castle (Roches Des Fées)	Fairy Rock Castle (Roches Des Fées)		606.280	130.460	46.325505°N 7.520183°E
10361		Hotel Bella Lui	Montana-Station 21	602.862	128.976	46.312178°N 7.475791°E

== Eischoll ==
KGS No.^{?}	Picture	Name	Street Address	CH1903 X coordinate	CH1903 Y coordinate	Location
Unknown		ISOS Dorf: Eischoll				

== Eisten ==
KGS No.^{?}	Picture	Name	Street Address	CH1903 X coordinate	CH1903 Y coordinate	Location
Unknown		ISOS Village: Eisten				

== Ernen ==
KGS No.^{?}	Picture	Name	Street Address	CH1903 X coordinate	CH1903 Y coordinate	Location
6709	Erner Galgen	Erner Galgen		654.500	139.360	46.403382°N 8.14734°E
10356		Jost-Sigristen House	Dorf	654.406	138.807	46.398415°N 8.146053°E
6715	Tellen House	Tellen House	Dorf	654.390	138.870	46.398983°N 8.145852°E
Unknown		ISOS Village: Ernen				
Unknown		ISOS Village: Mühlebach				

== Evionnaz ==
KGS No.^{?}	Picture	Name	Street Address	CH1903 X coordinate	CH1903 Y coordinate	Location
Unknown		ISOS village: Evionnaz				

== Evolène ==
KGS No.^{?}	Picture	Name	Street Address	CH1903 X coordinate	CH1903 Y coordinate	Location
9698	Alpage De Cotter Prehistoric Rock Carvings	Alpage De Cotter; Prehistoric Rock Carvings		606.200	107.320	46.117348°N 7.518837°E
10358	Maison d’habitation	Maison d’habitation	Les Haudères	604.000	106.000	46.105491°N 7.490368°E
Unknown		ISOS village: Evolène				
Unknown		ISOS village: Les Haudères				
Unknown		ISOS hameau: Lana				

== Ferden ==
KGS No.^{?}	Picture	Name	Street Address	CH1903 X coordinate	CH1903 Y coordinate	Location
10360		Rotigostadel		624.600	138.070	46.39354°N 7.758467°E

== Finhaut ==
KGS No.^{?}	Picture	Name	Street Address	CH1903 X coordinate	CH1903 Y coordinate	Location
Unknown		ISOS cas particulier: Finhaut				

== Fully ==
KGS No.^{?}	Picture	Name	Street Address	CH1903 X coordinate	CH1903 Y coordinate	Location
Unknown		ISOS hameau: Branson				

== Goms ==
KGS No.^{?}	Picture	Name	Street Address	CH1903 X coordinate	CH1903 Y coordinate	Location
6878	Church of St. Maria with Cemetery Chapel	Church of St. Maria with Cemetery Chapel	Münster-Geschinen	663.480	148.750	46.487056°N 8.265391°E
6948	Church of Mariä Geburt	Church of Mariä Geburt	Furkastrasse, Reckingen-Gluringen	661.738	146.781	46.469508°N 8.242443°E
Unknown		ISOS Dorf: Niederwald				
Unknown		ISOS Dorf: Gluringen				
Unknown		ISOS Dorf: Reckingen				
Unknown		ISOS Dorf: Biel				
Unknown		ISOS Dorf: Ritzingen				
Unknown		ISOS Dorf: Selkingen				
Unknown		ISOS Dorf: Geschinen				
Unknown		ISOS Dorf: Münster				
Unknown		ISOS Weiler: Ammere / Gadme /Wiler				
Unknown		ISOS Weiler: Bodmen				

== Grengiols ==
KGS No.^{?}	Picture	Name	Street Address	CH1903 X coordinate	CH1903 Y coordinate	Location
Unknown		ISOS Dorf: Grengiols				

== Guttet-Feschel ==
KGS No.^{?}	Picture	Name	Street Address	CH1903 X coordinate	CH1903 Y coordinate	Location
Unknown		ISOS Dorf: Feschel				

== Hérémence ==
KGS No.^{?}	Picture	Name	Street Address	CH1903 X coordinate	CH1903 Y coordinate	Location
10521	Saint-Nicolas Church, Hérémence	Saint-Nicolas Church, Hérémence		597.361	114.329	46.180421°N 7.404461°E
6775	aux Fées Cave	aux Fées Cave		596.000	109.830	46.139943°N 7.386874°E
9047	La Grande Dixence Dam	La Grande Dixence Dam		597.255	103.230	46.08058°N 7.403153°E
Unknown		ISOS village: Hérémence				
Unknown		ISOS hameau: Mâche / Mâchette				

== Isérables ==
KGS No.^{?}	Picture	Name	Street Address	CH1903 X coordinate	CH1903 Y coordinate	Location
Unknown		ISOS village: Isérables				

== Kippel ==
KGS No.^{?}	Picture	Name	Street Address	CH1903 X coordinate	CH1903 Y coordinate	Location
Unknown		ISOS Dorf: Kippel				

== Lens ==
KGS No.^{?}	Picture	Name	Street Address	CH1903 X coordinate	CH1903 Y coordinate	Location
Unknown		ISOS village: Lens				

== Leuk ==
KGS No.^{?}	Picture	Name	Street Address	CH1903 X coordinate	CH1903 Y coordinate	Location
6808	Dalaturm	Dalaturm		614.182	129.490	46.316659°N 7.62276°E
6801	Church of St. Stephan	Church of St. Stephan	Hauptplatz 16	615.125	129.564	46.317304°N 7.635005°E
6802	Rathaus (Town council house)	Rathaus (Town council house)	Rathausplatz 1	615.113	129.434	46.316135°N 7.634845°E
6803	Ringacker Chapel of Mariä Empfängnis with Hermitage	Ringacker Chapel of Mariä Empfängnis with Hermitage		615.150	129.190	46.313939°N 7.635317°E
6804	Zen-Ruffinen Castle / Loretan	Zen-Ruffinen Castle / Loretan		615.037	129.440	46.31619°N 7.633858°E
Unknown		ISOS Kleinstadt / Flecken: Leuk				
Unknown		ISOS Village: Erschmatt				

== Leukerbad ==
KGS No.^{?}	Picture	Name	Street Address	CH1903 X coordinate	CH1903 Y coordinate	Location
6820	Gemmi Daubenwand	Gemmi Daubenwand		613.680	138.041	46.39359°N 7.616494°E

== Liddes ==
KGS No.^{?}	Picture	Name	Street Address	CH1903 X coordinate	CH1903 Y coordinate	Location
6825	Les Moulins	Les Moulins		579.037	094.794	46.004375°N 7.168032°E
Unknown		ISOS village: Liddes				

== Martigny ==
KGS No.^{?}	Picture	Name	Street Address	CH1903 X coordinate	CH1903 Y coordinate	Location
6831	Centre valaisan du film	Centre valaisan du film	Avenue du Grand-St-Bernard 4	571.618	105.511	46.100507°N 7.071616°E
6832	La Bâtiaz Castle	La Bâtiaz Castle		571.440	106.020	46.105078°N 7.069284°E
9384	Gallo-Roman Museum, Automobile Museum, Fondation Pierre Gianadda	Gallo-Roman Museum, Automobile Museum, Fondation Pierre Gianadda		571.549	104.914	46.095134°N 7.07076°E
9700	City, Roman era and Modern City	City, Roman era and Modern City		571.800	105.300	46.098616°N 7.073983°E
Unknown		ISOS ville: Martigny-Ville				
Unknown		ISOS petite City / bourg: Martigny-Bourg				

== Martigny-Combe ==
KGS No.^{?}	Picture	Name	Street Address	CH1903 X coordinate	CH1903 Y coordinate	Location
Unknown		ISOS cas particulier: Plan Cerisier				

== Massongex ==
KGS No.^{?}	Picture	Name	Street Address	CH1903 X coordinate	CH1903 Y coordinate	Location
9701	Tarnaiae, Celtic - Gallo Roman Vicus	Tarnaiae, Celtic - Gallo Roman Vicus		565.320	121.375	46.242915°N 6.989001°E

== Mont-Noble ==
KGS No.^{?}	Picture	Name	Street Address	CH1903 X coordinate	CH1903 Y coordinate	Location
Unknown		ISOS village: Mase				

== Naters ==
KGS No.^{?}	Picture	Name	Street Address	CH1903 X coordinate	CH1903 Y coordinate	Location
6888	Ossuary	Ossuary	Beinhausweg	642.320	130.600	46.325461°N 7.988163°E
6887	Church of St. Mauritius	Church of St. Mauritius		642.300	130.615	46.325597°N 7.987905°E
Unknown		ISOS Urbanized Village: Naters				
Unknown		ISOS Village: Blatten				
Unknown		ISOS Hamlet: Bodmen				

== Niedergesteln ==
KGS No.^{?}	Picture	Name	Street Address	CH1903 X coordinate	CH1903 Y coordinate	Location
6903	Gestelnburg	Gestelnburg		626.540	129.150	46.313226°N 7.78318°E
Unknown		ISOS Dorf: Niedergesteln				

== Noble-Contrée ==
KGS No.^{?}	Picture	Name	Street Address	CH1903 X coordinate	CH1903 Y coordinate	Location
7163	Tower	Tower		607.199	128.480	46.307684°N 7.532085°E
Unknown		ISOS village: Venthône				

== Obergoms ==
KGS No.^{?}	Picture	Name	Street Address	CH1903 X coordinate	CH1903 Y coordinate	Location
Unknown		ISOS Dorf: Obergesteln				
Unknown		ISOS Dorf: Ulrichen				
Unknown		ISOS Spezialfall: Gletsch				

== Oberwald ==
KGS No.^{?}	Picture	Name	Street Address	CH1903 X coordinate	CH1903 Y coordinate	Location
10362	Furkabahn Cog-Wheel Railway	Furkabahn; Cog-Wheel Railway		669.000	154.000	46.533734°N 8.33806°E

== Orsières ==
KGS No.^{?}	Picture	Name	Street Address	CH1903 X coordinate	CH1903 Y coordinate	Location
10447	Botanical Gardens of Alpin Flore-Alpe	Botanical Gardens of Alpin Flore-Alpe	Champex	574.109	098.241	46.035211°N 7.104229°E
Unknown		ISOS hameau: Commeire				

== Raron ==
KGS No.^{?}	Picture	Name	Street Address	CH1903 X coordinate	CH1903 Y coordinate	Location
6940		Heidnischbühl, Prehistoric Site		628.600	128.800	46.309993°N 7.809901°E
6936	Church of St. Roman with old Rectory	Church of St. Roman with old Rectory	Burghügel	628.085	128.872	46.310662°N 7.80322°E
6939	Wohnturm der Viztume	Wohnturm der Viztume		628.126	128.895	46.310867°N 7.803754°E
Unknown		ISOS Dorf: Raron				
Unknown		ISOS Weiler: Rarner Chumma				
Unknown		ISOS Spezialfall:Turtig/Wandfluh shared with Bürchen, Raron and Unterbäch				

== Riederalp ==
KGS No.^{?}	Picture	Name	Street Address	CH1903 X coordinate	CH1903 Y coordinate	Location
Unknown		ISOS Dorf: Goppisberg				
Unknown		ISOS Dorf: Greich				

== Saas-Balen ==
KGS No.^{?}	Picture	Name	Street Address	CH1903 X coordinate	CH1903 Y coordinate	Location
6967	Church of Mariä Himmelfahrt	Church of Mariä Himmelfahrt		637.711	111.452	46.153491°N 7.92677°E
Unknown		ISOS Weiler: Bidermatten				

== Saillon ==
KGS No.^{?}	Picture	Name	Street Address	CH1903 X coordinate	CH1903 Y coordinate	Location
10448	Fortifications	Fortifications		580.392	113.356	46.171388°N 7.184748°E
6975	Bayard Tower	Bayard Tower		580.230	113.260	46.17052°N 7.182654°E
Unknown		ISOS petite city / bourg: Saillon				

== Saint-Gingolph ==
KGS No.^{?}	Picture	Name	Street Address	CH1903 X coordinate	CH1903 Y coordinate	Location
Unknown		ISOS cas particulier: Saint-Gingolph				

== Saint-Léonard ==
KGS No.^{?}	Picture	Name	Street Address	CH1903 X coordinate	CH1903 Y coordinate	Location
9702		Crête Des Barmes, gravures rupestres néolithiques		598.850	123.700	46.264723°N 7.423721°E

== Saint-Luc ==
KGS No.^{?}	Picture	Name	Street Address	CH1903 X coordinate	CH1903 Y coordinate	Location
7106	Groupe Des 5 Moulins	Groupe Des 5 Moulins		612.840	118.360	46.216565°N 7.60503°E

== Saint-Maurice ==
KGS No.^{?}	Picture	Name	Street Address	CH1903 X coordinate	CH1903 Y coordinate	Location
7114; 8825; 8669; 9703	St-Maurice D’Agaune Abbey, Foundation of Historical Archives, Archeological Discoveries of the Abbey	St-Maurice D’Agaune Abbey, Foundation of Historical Archives, Archeological Discoveries of the Abbey		566.420	118.750	46.219358°N 7.003451°E
7117; 8710	Castle, Cantonal Military Museum	Castle, Cantonal Military Museum	Route du Chablais	566.396	119.184	46.223261°N 7.003109°E
7118	Maison de la Pierre	Maison de la Pierre	Grand-Rue 54	566.527	118.750	46.219364°N 7.004838°E
10365	Bridge over the Rhône, shared with Bex, Vaud	Bridge over the Rhône, shared with Bex, Vaud	Route du Chablais / Route de Saint-Maurice	566.421	119.207	46.223469°N 7.003431°E
Unknown		ISOS petite City / bourg: Saint-Maurice				

== Salvan ==
KGS No.^{?}	Picture	Name	Street Address	CH1903 X coordinate	CH1903 Y coordinate	Location
6980	Les Marécottes, A Storage Basin for the Swiss Federal Railways	Les Marécottes, A Storage Basin for the Swiss Federal Railways		566.500	106.500	46.109169°N 7.005364°E
Unknown		ISOS hameau: Le Trétien				

== Sembrancher ==
KGS No.^{?}	Picture	Name	Street Address	CH1903 X coordinate	CH1903 Y coordinate	Location
Unknown		ISOS petite City / bourg: Sembrancher				

== Sierre ==
KGS No.^{?}	Picture	Name	Street Address	CH1903 X coordinate	CH1903 Y coordinate	Location
7007	Centrale Électrique and Bâtiments Alusuisse	Centrale Électrique and Bâtiments Alusuisse	Chippis	607.850	125.770	46.283299°N 7.54049°E
Unknown		ISOS cas particulier: Sierre				

== Simplon ==
KGS No.^{?}	Picture	Name	Street Address	CH1903 X coordinate	CH1903 Y coordinate	Location
7030	Old Hospiz	Old Hospiz		644.495	120.575	46.235142°N 8.015448°E
Unknown		ISOS Dorf: Simplon Village				
Unknown		ISOS Weiler: Eggen				
Unknown		ISOS Spezialfall: Simplon Pass				

== Sion ==
KGS No.^{?}	Picture	Name	Street Address	CH1903 X coordinate	CH1903 Y coordinate	Location
8823		Archives De L’Etat Du Valais	Rue Des Vergers 7	593.822	120.028	46.231664°N 7.358555°E
8723; 8904; 8903	Archives and Museum de l’Evêché de Sion et Archives du vénérable Chapitre cathédral de Sion	Archives and Museum de l’Evêché de Sion et Archives du vénérable Chapitre cathédral de Sion	Rue de la Tour 12	593.801	120.258	46.233732°N 7.358279°E
7035	Notre-Dame Cathedral	Notre-Dame Cathedral		593.875	120.286	46.233985°N 7.359238°E
7058; 9349	Couvent des Capucins and Library	Couvent des Capucins and Library		593.840	120.700	46.237709°N 7.358779°E
7037	Church and Castle Notre-Dame de Valère	Church and Castle Notre-Dame de Valère	Ruelle de Tous-Vents 15	594.267	120.249	46.233656°N 7.36432°E
7038	Church of St-Théodule	Church of St-Théodule		593.858	120.236	46.233535°N 7.359018°E
7040	Hôtel de Ville (City Hall)	Hôtel de Ville (City Hall)	Rue du Grand-Pont 12	593.985	120.263	46.233779°N 7.360664°E
7041	La Majorie Castle	La Majorie Castle	Rue des châteaux 19	594.083	120.338	46.234455°N 7.361934°E
10367	Le Vidomnat	Le Vidomnat	Place de la Majorie15	594.033	120.327	46.234355°N 7.361286°E
7042	Maison Supersaxo	Maison Supersaxo	Rue Supersaxo 4	593.928	120.208	46.233284°N 7.359926°E
9316	Médiathèque Valais Sion	Médiathèque Valais Sion	Rue des Vergers 9	593.822	120.028	46.231664°N 7.358555°E
8721; 8722	Cantonal Museum of Fine Arts and History Museum	Cantonal Museum of Fine Arts and History Museum		594.075	120.311	46.234212°N 7.361831°E
7044	Ruins of Tourbillon Castle	Ruins of Tourbillon Castle		594.470	120.560	46.236455°N 7.366948°E
9704	Old City, Neolithic and Modern City	Old City, Neolithic and Modern City		593.600	119.800	46.229611°N 7.35568°E
Unknown		ISOS ville: Sion				
Unknown		ISOS village: Bramois				

== Stalden ==
KGS No.^{?}	Picture	Name	Street Address	CH1903 X coordinate	CH1903 Y coordinate	Location
7086		Kinbrücke (bridge) over the Mattervispa with a Wayside shrine		633.370	119.880	46.229533°N 7.871183°E
Unknown		ISOS Dorf: Stalden (VS)				
Unknown		ISOS Spezialfall: Neubrück				

== Törbel ==
KGS No.^{?}	Picture	Name	Street Address	CH1903 X coordinate	CH1903 Y coordinate	Location
7134	Mill	Mill	Walke	631.175	120.940	46.239174°N 7.842802°E
Unknown		ISOS Dorf: Törbel				
Unknown		ISOS Weiler: Burge				
Unknown		ISOS Weiler: Feld				

== Turtmann ==
KGS No.^{?}	Picture	Name	Street Address	CH1903 X coordinate	CH1903 Y coordinate	Location
Unknown		ISOS Dorf: Turtmann				

== Unterbäch ==
KGS No.^{?}	Picture	Name	Street Address	CH1903 X coordinate	CH1903 Y coordinate	Location
Unknown		ISOS Spezialfall:Turtig/Wandfluh shared with Bürchen, Raron, Unterbäch				

== Val-d'Illiez ==
KGS No.^{?}	Picture	Name	Street Address	CH1903 X coordinate	CH1903 Y coordinate	Location
10368	Maison D’Habitation	Maison D’Habitation	Plat	557.560	116.364	46.197395°N 6.888848°E

== Val de Bagnes ==
KGS No.^{?}	Picture	Name	Street Address	CH1903 X coordinate	CH1903 Y coordinate	Location
6604	Alpage De Louvie	Alpage De Louvie	Mauvoisin	589.920	100.060	46.051994°N 7.308404°E
6603	Church of St-Maurice, Ossuary and Former Rectory	Church of St-Maurice, Ossuary and Former Rectory	Le Châble	582.230	103.240	46.080441°N 7.20893°E
Unknown		ISOS village: Bruson				
Unknown		ISOS village: Le Châble				
Unknown		ISOS village: Médières				
Unknown		ISOS village: Sarreyer				
Unknown		ISOS hameau: Fontenelle				
Unknown		ISOS village: Vollèges				
Unknown		ISOS hameau: Vens				

== Vernayaz ==
KGS No.^{?}	Picture	Name	Street Address	CH1903 X coordinate	CH1903 Y coordinate	Location
Unknown		ISOS hameau: Miéville				

== Vionnaz ==
KGS No.^{?}	Picture	Name	Street Address	CH1903 X coordinate	CH1903 Y coordinate	Location
Unknown		ISOS village: Vionnaz				

== Visp ==
KGS No.^{?}	Picture	Name	Street Address	CH1903 X coordinate	CH1903 Y coordinate	Location
Unknown		ISOS Kleinstadt / Flecken: Visp				

== Visperterminen ==
KGS No.^{?}	Picture	Name	Street Address	CH1903 X coordinate	CH1903 Y coordinate	Location
9705		Oberstalden, Bronze Age / Medieval Settlement		635.200	124.600	46.271899°N 7.895259°E
Unknown		ISOS Weiler: Barmüli				
Unknown		ISOS Weiler: Bitzinen				
Unknown		ISOS Weiler: Niederhäusern				
Unknown		ISOS Weiler: Oberstalden				
Unknown		ISOS Weiler: Unterstalden				

== Vouvry ==
KGS No.^{?}	Picture	Name	Street Address	CH1903 X coordinate	CH1903 Y coordinate	Location
Unknown		ISOS village: Vouvry				

== Zermatt ==
KGS No.^{?}	Picture	Name	Street Address	CH1903 X coordinate	CH1903 Y coordinate	Location
9706		Hubelwäng, Petroglyphs / Prehistoric Grinding Stones	Felszeichnungen / prähistorische	622.500	095.600	46.011575°N 7.729122°E

== Zwischbergen ==
KGS No.^{?}	Picture	Name	Street Address	CH1903 X coordinate	CH1903 Y coordinate	Location
7229		Ruins of the Gold Mine at Gondo		654.150	115.400	46.187884°N 8.140004°E

== See also ==
- List of cultural property of regional significance in Switzerland: Valais
