= List of cultural property of regional significance in Switzerland: Valais =

This list contains all cultural property of regional significance (class B) in the canton of Valais from the 2009 Swiss Inventory of Cultural Property of National and Regional Significance. It is sorted by municipality.

== Albinen ==
KGS No.^{?}	Picture	Name	Street Address	CH1903 X coordinate	CH1903 Y coordinate	Location
6590		Haus Beney-Zumofen (Wandmalereien)		615.000	132.600	46.344617°N 7.63348°E

== Ardon ==
KGS No.^{?}	Picture	Name	Street Address	CH1903 X coordinate	CH1903 Y coordinate	Location
6593		Eglise St-Jean (site archéologique), clocher et cure (avec inscriptions romaines)		585.960	117.635	46.210019°N 7.256715°E
6594		Ruines du château du Crêt		585.580	118.140	46.214554°N 7.251776°E

== Ausserberg ==
KGS No.^{?}	Picture	Name	Street Address	CH1903 X coordinate	CH1903 Y coordinate	Location
6595		Kirche St. Josef (spätgotischer Flügelaltar)		631.780	129.290	46.314258°N 7.851214°E

== Ayent ==
KGS No.^{?}	Picture	Name	Street Address	CH1903 X coordinate	CH1903 Y coordinate	Location
6598		Argnou, chapelle Ste-Marie-Madeleine		596.930	123.800	46.265616°N 7.398817°E
6599	Botyre, chapelle St-Martin	Botyre, chapelle St-Martin		597.360	124.980	46.276233°N 7.404388°E
6600	Botyre, maison peinte	Botyre, maison peinte	Rue de Botyre 81	597.380	124.950	46.275963°N 7.404648°E
6601	Eglise St-Romain avec clocher et voisinage	Eglise St-Romain avec clocher et voisinage		598.007	125.691	46.282631°N 7.412779°E

== Bagnes ==
KGS No.^{?}	Picture	Name	Street Address	CH1903 X coordinate	CH1903 Y coordinate	Location
10693	Forge Oreiller	Forge Oreiller	Chemin des Condémines 1	582.341	103.557	46.083296°N 7.210353°E
6608		Le Cotterg, fontaine du village		582.380	103.770	46.085213°N 7.210849°E
13908		Mauvoisin, alpage de la Lia		592.780	926.00	50.395597°N 12.016561°E
13909		Mauvoisin, alpage de Vasevay		592.600	964.50	50.372678°N 12.555869°E
13910		Mauvoisin, alpage du Crêt		591.970	975.40	50.360573°N 12.70794°E
13911		Mauvoisin, alpage du Giétro		593.770	930.00	50.402362°N 12.073438°E
6613	Mauvoisin, ancien pont	Mauvoisin, ancien pont		592.530	949.20	50.380803°N 12.341473°E
10691	Musée de la pierre ollaire à Champsec	Musée de la pierre ollaire à Champsec	Chemin des Fontaines 8	584.891	100.601	46.056767°N 7.243413°E
8744		Musée des glaciers à Lourtier	Chemin Jean-Pierre Perraudin 9	586.690	997.00	50.299934°N 13.005126°E
10692	Scie et moulin de Sarreyer	Scie et moulin de Sarreyer	Chemin du Moulin 1	585.425	101.407	46.064029°N 7.250287°E

== Baltschieder ==
KGS No.^{?}	Picture	Name	Street Address	CH1903 X coordinate	CH1903 Y coordinate	Location
6618		Muttergotteskapelle		632.832	128.757	46.309413°N 7.864834°E

== Bellwald ==
KGS No.^{?}	Picture	Name	Street Address	CH1903 X coordinate	CH1903 Y coordinate	Location
6621		Fürgangen, Kapelle (Altar)		654.830	140.360	46.41235°N 8.151749°E
6623		Ried, Muttergotteskapelle		655.121	142.436	46.431°N 8.15578°E

== Binn ==
KGS No.^{?}	Picture	Name	Street Address	CH1903 X coordinate	CH1903 Y coordinate	Location
6632		Eisenzeitliches Gräberfeld beim Hotel Ofenhorn		657.420	135.060	46.364459°N 8.184777°E
6633	Heiligkreuz, Wallfahrtskapelle und Wirtshaus	Heiligkreuz, Wallfahrtskapelle und Wirtshaus		656.680	132.480	46.341314°N 8.174847°E
6634		Kalkbrennofen		657.979	135.239	46.366021°N 8.192062°E
14104		Kapelle St. Martin		659.553	135.740	46.37039°N 8.212579°E
6635		Stiftung, Regionalmuseum Graeser-Andenmatten	Ufem Acher 2	657.460	135.050	46.364365°N 8.185295°E
6630	Willern, Kirche St. Michael und altes Pfarrhaus	Willern, Kirche St. Michael und altes Pfarrhaus		657.140	134.870	46.362773°N 8.181115°E

== Blatten ==
KGS No.^{?}	Picture	Name	Street Address	CH1903 X coordinate	CH1903 Y coordinate	Location
6641		Fafleralp, Kapelle		632.307	142.713	46.434979°N 7.858989°E
6642		Kühmatt, Kapelle Mariä Heimsuchung		631.105	142.039	46.428973°N 7.843305°E

== Bourg-Saint-Pierre ==
KGS No.^{?}	Picture	Name	Street Address	CH1903 X coordinate	CH1903 Y coordinate	Location
6651	Ancien hôpital	Ancien hôpital	Rue de l'Hôpital 6	582.160	886.00	50.32004°N 11.448169°E
6654	Chapelle Notre-Dame de Lorette	Chapelle Notre-Dame de Lorette		582.258	896.93	50.31582°N 11.601243°E
6656	Moulin sur le torrent de Valsorey	Moulin sur le torrent de Valsorey		582.190	884.40	50.321039°N 11.42579°E

== Brig-Glis ==
KGS No.^{?}	Picture	Name	Street Address	CH1903 X coordinate	CH1903 Y coordinate	Location
6666		Grundbiel, jungsteinzeitliches Gräberfeld		640.500	128.800	46.309381°N 7.964374°E
6668	Kapelle St. Antonius Eremita	Kapelle St. Antonius Eremita		642.628	129.380	46.314467°N 7.99205°E
6669	Kapelle St. Sebastian	Kapelle St. Sebastian		642.310	129.580	46.316286°N 7.98794°E
6670		Kollegiumskirche Spiritus Sanctus mit altem Kollegium		642.650	129.490	46.315455°N 7.992346°E
13912		Museum Stockalperschloss	Alte Simplonstrasse 39	642.520	129.468	46.315265°N 7.990656°E
10598		Stockalperarchiv Brig und Archiv des Geschichtsforschenden Vereins Oberwallis	Alte Simplonstrasse 28	642.520	129.468	46.315265°N 7.990656°E

== Chalais ==
KGS No.^{?}	Picture	Name	Street Address	CH1903 X coordinate	CH1903 Y coordinate	Location
6677		Les Granges		605.400	123.740	46.265062°N 7.508678°E
6678		Réchy, maison Siegen		604.420	123.340	46.261471°N 7.495963°E
6680		Ancien chalet et chapelle de Chastonay		607.010	122.870	46.257221°N 7.529547°E
6681	Clocher et choeur de l'ancienne église	Clocher et choeur de l'ancienne église		607.286	122.897	46.257461°N 7.533127°E

== Chamoson ==
KGS No.^{?}	Picture	Name	Street Address	CH1903 X coordinate	CH1903 Y coordinate	Location
6683		Eglise St-André et cure		584.467	115.662	46.192238°N 7.237435°E

== Chippis ==
KGS No.^{?}	Picture	Name	Street Address	CH1903 X coordinate	CH1903 Y coordinate	Location
6691		Eglise St-Urbain et école		607.83	125.460	46.28051°N 7.540225°E
6692		Pont de fer sur le Rhône		607.850	125.665	46.282354°N 7.540488°E
13913		Site industriel d'Alusuisse, rive gauche, avec usine hydroélectrique		608.300	125.500	46.280865°N 7.546324°E

== Collombey-Muraz ==
KGS No.^{?}	Picture	Name	Street Address	CH1903 X coordinate	CH1903 Y coordinate	Location
6695	Collombey, Château d'Arbignon (monastère)	Collombey, Château d'Arbignon (monastère)		561.930	124.120	46.267425°N 6.944826°E
6696	Collombey, Maison de commune	Collombey, Maison de commune	Rue des Dents-du-Midi 44	562.030	124.300	46.269049°N 6.946108°E
6697	Collombey, Manoir de Lavallaz (Châtillon-Larringes)	Collombey, Manoir de Lavallaz (Châtillon-Larringes)	Rue des Dent-du-Midi 28	562.050	124.100	46.267251°N 6.946384°E
6694	La Barmaz et Châble-Croix, sites préhistoriques	La Barmaz et Châble-Croix, sites préhistoriques		561.500	124.850	46.273967°N 6.939188°E

== Collonges ==
KGS No.^{?}	Picture	Name	Street Address	CH1903 X coordinate	CH1903 Y coordinate	Location
6699		Verdant (site archéologique)		568.000	114.500	46.181205°N 7.024218°E

== Conthey ==
KGS No.^{?}	Picture	Name	Street Address	CH1903 X coordinate	CH1903 Y coordinate	Location
6701		Bourg, chapelle Ste-Pétronille		589.420	120.095	46.232212°N 7.301492°E
6702		Eglise St-Séverin et groupe de vieilles maisons		589.332	120.384	46.23481°N 7.300345°E
10615		Maison d'habitation / Villa Suter	Rue d'Erbignon 24	589.270	119.610	46.227846°N 7.299559°E

== Ernen ==
KGS No.^{?}	Picture	Name	Street Address	CH1903 X coordinate	CH1903 Y coordinate	Location
6596		Brücke über die Binna		654.800	136.170	46.374662°N 8.150864°E
6708		Erner Wald, Wallfahrtskapelle Maria Hilf		654.710	138.240	46.39329°N 8.149938°E
6710		Kirche St. Georg		654.250	138.850	46.398814°N 8.144029°E
9435		Kirchenmuseum und Pfarrarchiv		654.250	138.850	46.398814°N 8.144029°E
6869	Mühlebach, Kapelle Hl. Familie	Mühlebach, Kapelle Hl. Familie		655.270	139.860	46.407816°N 8.157411°E
6871		Mühlebach, Schinerhaus vor dem Dorf		655.210	139.820	46.407461°N 8.156626°E
10696		Museum im Jost-Sigristen-Haus	Hengert 1	654.406	138.807	46.398415°N 8.146053°E
10697		Museum und Archiv im Zendenrathaus		654.410	138.840	46.398711°N 8.146108°E
6597		Rosenkranzkapelle		654.660	137.005	46.382185°N 8.149143°E
6716		Zendenrathaus		654.410	138.840	46.398711°N 8.146108°E

== Ferden ==
KGS No.^{?}	Picture	Name	Street Address	CH1903 X coordinate	CH1903 Y coordinate	Location
6735		Faldumalp mit Kapelle		623.100	136.300	46.377671°N 7.738878°E
6736		Goppenstein, ehemaliges Bleibergwerk mit Aufbereitungsanlage		624.676	134.721	46.363411°N 7.759277°E

== Fiesch ==
KGS No.^{?}	Picture	Name	Street Address	CH1903 X coordinate	CH1903 Y coordinate	Location
14950		Siedlung Feriendorf		653.447	138.578	46.396432°N 8.133557°E

== Fieschertal ==
KGS No.^{?}	Picture	Name	Street Address	CH1903 X coordinate	CH1903 Y coordinate	Location
6741		Wichel, Kapelle St. Antonius und Stadel		654.435	141.298	46.42082°N 8.146722°E

== Finhaut ==
KGS No.^{?}	Picture	Name	Street Address	CH1903 X coordinate	CH1903 Y coordinate	Location
6743		Aqueduc du Châtelard		562.984	100.950	46.059061°N 6.960328°E

== Fully ==
KGS No.^{?}	Picture	Name	Street Address	CH1903 X coordinate	CH1903 Y coordinate	Location
6747	Usine électrique (ancienne usine d'emboutissage)	Usine électrique (ancienne usine d'emboutissage)	Chemin de l'Usine 21	575.150	110.200	46.142826°N 7.117041°E

== Grafschaft ==
KGS No.^{?}	Picture	Name	Street Address	CH1903 X coordinate	CH1903 Y coordinate	Location
6993		Haus Walther-Chastonay	Furkastrasse 23	659.482	144.987	46.453574°N 8.212842°E
6994		Mühle		659.570	145.010	46.453773°N 8.21399°E
6962	Ritzingerfeld, Muttergotteskapelle	Ritzingerfeld, Muttergotteskapelle		660.557	145.759	46.460422°N 8.226934°E

== Grengiols ==
KGS No.^{?}	Picture	Name	Street Address	CH1903 X coordinate	CH1903 Y coordinate	Location
6760		Burgruine		650.700	135.500	46.368958°N 8.097507°E
6764		Ze Brigge, Eisenbahnbrücke über die Rhone		650.500	136.380	46.376889°N 8.095003°E

== Grimisuat ==
KGS No.^{?}	Picture	Name	Street Address	CH1903 X coordinate	CH1903 Y coordinate	Location
6770		Cure (ancien château) avec raccard	Rue du Château 4	595.760	123.280	46.260932°N 7.383646°E
6771		Eglise St-Pancrace (clocher et intérieurs)		595.910	123.160	46.259854°N 7.385593°E

== Kippel ==
KGS No.^{?}	Picture	Name	Street Address	CH1903 X coordinate	CH1903 Y coordinate	Location
6791		Haus Murmann		625.660	138.697	46.39914°N 7.772283°E
13915		Hockenalp, Stafel mit Kapelle		625.100	139.950	46.410433°N 7.765069°E
6792		Kirche St. Martin mit Beinhaus		625.736	138.680	46.398984°N 7.77327°E
6793	Lötschentaler Museum	Lötschentaler Museum		625.720	138.720	46.399345°N 7.773064°E
10699		Lötschentaler Museum		625.720	138.720	46.399345°N 7.773064°E

== Lax ==
KGS No.^{?}	Picture	Name	Street Address	CH1903 X coordinate	CH1903 Y coordinate	Location
6794	Kirche St. Anna	Kirche St. Anna		652.360	137.720	46.3888°N 8.119328°E

== Lens ==
KGS No.^{?}	Picture	Name	Street Address	CH1903 X coordinate	CH1903 Y coordinate	Location
6797	Eglise St-Pierre et clocher	Eglise St-Pierre et clocher		600.500	125.260	46.278757°N 7.445124°E
6798	Le Manoir	Le Manoir	Chemin du Châtelard 18	600.450	125.235	46.278532°N 7.444475°E
6799	Statue monumentale du Christ-Roi et site préhistorique du Châtelard	Statue monumentale du Christ-Roi et site préhistorique du Châtelard		599.920	124.640	46.27318°N 7.437599°E
6800	Vaas, Maison peinte (ancienne auberge)	Vaas, Maison peinte (ancienne auberge)		601.140	124.100	46.268321°N 7.453424°E

== Les Agettes ==
KGS No.^{?}	Picture	Name	Street Address	CH1903 X coordinate	CH1903 Y coordinate	Location
6588	Chalet Jacques Allet (Supersaxo)	Chalet Jacques Allet (Supersaxo)		594.598	116.437	46.199367°N 7.368655°E

== Leuk ==
KGS No.^{?}	Picture	Name	Street Address	CH1903 X coordinate	CH1903 Y coordinate	Location
6806		Alte Kür		615.150	129.570	46.317357°N 7.635329°E
6807		Bischofsschloss (mit Heimatmuseum)	Rathausplatz 5	615.035	129.441	46.316199°N 7.633832°E
6810		Juon-Haus	Friedhofgasse 2	615.110	129.630	46.317898°N 7.634812°E
6812		Mageranhaus	Kreuzgasse 4	615.120	129.510	46.316818°N 7.634938°E
6813	Majorshof von Werra Galdinen	Majorshof von Werra Galdinen	Galdinen 1	614.900	129.600	46.317633°N 7.632085°E
6814		Pfarr- und Zendenarchiv im Pfarrhaus	Kreuzgasse 37	615.150	129.580	46.317447°N 7.63533°E
10603	Pont sur le Rhône	Pont sur le Rhône		615.400	129.000	46.312224°N 7.638556°E
6815		Schützenlaube	Schützenlaube 10	615.280	129.430	46.316095°N 7.637013°E
6816		Susten, Schloss Mageran / de Werra (jetzt Altersasyl St. Josef)	Kantonsstrasse 80	616.300	128.300	46.305906°N 7.650215°E
6817		Thel, Kapelle Hl. Familie (Ex Voto)	Thel 44	616.460	130.320	46.324073°N 7.652364°E

== Leukerbad ==
KGS No.^{?}	Picture	Name	Street Address	CH1903 X coordinate	CH1903 Y coordinate	Location
6821	Kirche Maria Hilf	Kirche Maria Hilf		614.667	136.463	46.379374°N 7.629276°E

== Leytron ==
KGS No.^{?}	Picture	Name	Street Address	CH1903 X coordinate	CH1903 Y coordinate	Location
6822	Ancienne église et clocher	Ancienne église et clocher		582.230	114.970	46.185958°N 7.208485°E
6823		Dugny et Montagnon, anciennes maisons (avec cheminées "savoyardes")		580.200	115.300	46.18887°N 7.18218°E
6824	Maison Rossier	Maison Rossier	Route de Chamoson 11	582.270	115.100	46.187129°N 7.208999°E

== Liddes ==
KGS No.^{?}	Picture	Name	Street Address	CH1903 X coordinate	CH1903 Y coordinate	Location
6827	Chapelle St-Etienne	Chapelle St-Etienne		580.656	928.78	50.28552°N 12.045645°E
6828	Maison Bastian	Maison Bastian	Rue du Fond de Ville 30	580.400	934.00	50.280459°N 12.118438°E

== Martigny ==
KGS No.^{?}	Picture	Name	Street Address	CH1903 X coordinate	CH1903 Y coordinate	Location
6836	Eglise Notre-Dame des Champs	Eglise Notre-Dame des Champs		571.770	105.520	46.100594°N 7.073581°E
6837	Fondation Claude Bellanger	Fondation Claude Bellanger		571.150	104.800	46.094091°N 7.065608°E
10575		Hôtel Clerc	Rue Marc Morand 13	571.650	105.830	46.103378°N 7.072011°E
6838	Hôtel de Ville avec archives	Hôtel de Ville avec archives	Rue de l'Hôtel de Ville 1	571.730	105.530	46.100682°N 7.073064°E
6840		La Bâtiaz, pont couvert sur la Drance		571.570	106.003	46.104931°N 7.070966°E
6841	Le Manoir (maison Ganioz)	Le Manoir (maison Ganioz)	Rue de la Dranse 3	571.650	105.720	46.102388°N 7.072018°E
6842	Maison du St-Bernard (Prévôté)	Maison du St-Bernard (Prévôté)	Rue de l'Hôtel de Ville 18	571.760	105.470	46.100144°N 7.073455°E
6843	Maison Supersaxo	Maison Supersaxo	Rue des Alpes 1	571.860	105.480	46.100238°N 7.074748°E
8745	Stiftung B. & S. Tissières	Stiftung B. & S. Tissières	Avenue de la Gare 6	571.805	105.671	46.101954°N 7.074025°E

== Massongex ==
KGS No.^{?}	Picture	Name	Street Address	CH1903 X coordinate	CH1903 Y coordinate	Location
6848	Eglise St-Jean-Baptiste, clocher et cure avec inscriptions romaines	Eglise St-Jean-Baptiste, clocher et cure avec inscriptions romaines		565.360	121.340	46.242603°N 6.989522°E
6849	Mosaïque romaine (au Café du Caveau Romain)	Mosaïque romaine (au Café du Caveau Romain)		565.350	121.300	46.242242°N 6.989395°E

== Monthey ==
KGS No.^{?}	Picture	Name	Street Address	CH1903 X coordinate	CH1903 Y coordinate	Location
6854		Ancien dépôt de sel puis arsenal	Rue du Bourg-aux-Favres 26	561.970	122.400	46.251955°N 6.945485°E
6855		Chapelle Notre-Dame du Pont		562.027	122.310	46.251148°N 6.946231°E
6856		Château avec musée et archives du Vieux-Monthey	Rue du Château 7	562.010	122.450	46.252407°N 6.945999°E
6857		Château-Vieux (site archéologique)		562.020	122.220	46.250338°N 6.946148°E
6858	Choëx, église St-Sylvestre et cure	Choëx, église St-Sylvestre et cure		563.130	121.470	46.243654°N 6.9606°E
6859		Choëx, site romain de Marendeux		562.500	121.700	46.245688°N 6.952413°E
6862		Le Crochetan, maison Dufay (de Kalbermatten)	Avenue du Crochetan 12	562.160	122.640	46.254124°N 6.947929°E
6863		Maison Delacoste	Place de Tübingen 2	562.120	122.420	46.252143°N 6.947428°E
10701		Musée du Vieux-Monthey	Rue du Château 7	562.005	122.448	46.252389°N 6.945935°E

== Naters ==
KGS No.^{?}	Picture	Name	Street Address	CH1903 X coordinate	CH1903 Y coordinate	Location
6885		Blatten, Kirche St. Theodul		641.925	134.198	46.357851°N 7.983358°E
6889		Burgruine Supersaxo		642.270	130.870	46.327893°N 7.987538°E
6890	Junkerhof	Junkerhof	Kirchstrasse 3	642.270	130.590	46.325374°N 7.987513°E
6891	Kapelle St. Antonius im Klosi	Kapelle St. Antonius im Klosi		642.100	130.920	46.328353°N 7.985335°E
6893	Lergienhaus (ob Pfarrhaus)	Lergienhaus (ob Pfarrhaus)	Schulhausstrasse 1	642.220	130.670	46.326097°N 7.986871°E
6894	Ornavasso-Turm	Ornavasso-Turm	Schulhausstrasse 6	642.160	130.780	46.32709°N 7.986102°E
6895	Pfarrhaus mit Archiv	Pfarrhaus mit Archiv	Judengasse 44	642.250	130.650	46.325915°N 7.987259°E
6896	Spycher Michel Supersaxo	Spycher Michel Supersaxo	Schlossweg 2	642.330	130.770	46.326989°N 7.988308°E

== Nendaz ==
KGS No.^{?}	Picture	Name	Street Address	CH1903 X coordinate	CH1903 Y coordinate	Location
6899		Basse-Nendaz, Eglise St-Légier (fresques) et cure		590.270	115.340	46.18945°N 7.312609°E
6900		Haute Nendaz, chapelle St-Michel		589.140	115.110	46.187364°N 7.297978°E

== Niedergesteln ==
KGS No.^{?}	Picture	Name	Street Address	CH1903 X coordinate	CH1903 Y coordinate	Location
6904		Häuserzeile Eischler-Haus		626.470	129.280	46.314398°N 7.782279°E
6905	Kirche St. Maria mit Beinhaus	Kirche St. Maria mit Beinhaus		626.490	129.280	46.314397°N 7.782539°E
6906		Pfarrhaus	Pfarreigasse 8	626.480	129.175	46.313453°N 7.782403°E

== Niederwald ==
KGS No.^{?}	Picture	Name	Street Address	CH1903 X coordinate	CH1903 Y coordinate	Location
6909		Kirche St. Theodul mit Beinhaus und Friedhof		657.686	142.989	46.435759°N 8.189218°E
6910		Rottebrigge, Kapelle St. Sebastian (Nothelferkapelle) mit Gruppe Heustadel		658.260	143.025	46.436033°N 8.196691°E

== Oberems ==
KGS No.^{?}	Picture	Name	Street Address	CH1903 X coordinate	CH1903 Y coordinate	Location
6911		Alte Kapelle		619.750	125.590	46.281435°N 7.694882°E

== Port-Valais ==
KGS No.^{?}	Picture	Name	Street Address	CH1903 X coordinate	CH1903 Y coordinate	Location
6929		Bouveret, bibliothèque des Bénédictins du Foyer St-Benoît	Route de l'Eglise 38	554.700	137.340	46.385895°N 6.849761°E
6930		Bouveret, gare et débarcadère		554.860	137.450	46.386895°N 6.85183°E
6931		Bouveret, Hôtel de la Tour (ancien dépôt de sel)		554.860	137.450	46.386895°N 6.85183°E
6932		Site archéologique du promontoire		556.400	135.800	46.372155°N 6.872004°E

== Randa ==
KGS No.^{?}	Picture	Name	Street Address	CH1903 X coordinate	CH1903 Y coordinate	Location
6934		Kirche St. Sebastian		626.732	105.582	46.101213°N 7.784325°E

== Randogne ==
KGS No.^{?}	Picture	Name	Street Address	CH1903 X coordinate	CH1903 Y coordinate	Location
14951		Tour Super-Crans		604.046	129.760	46.319225°N 7.491168°E

== Raron ==
KGS No.^{?}	Picture	Name	Street Address	CH1903 X coordinate	CH1903 Y coordinate	Location
9073	Bietschtal Viadukt BLS	Bietschtal Viadukt BLS		628.900	130.250	46.323024°N 7.813886°E
6938		Haus von Ulrich Ruffiner (Haus Imboden)	Ulrich-Ruffiner-Weg 2	628.070	128.725	46.309341°N 7.803017°E
6941		Maxenhaus	Dorfplatz 9	627.850	129.000	46.311823°N 7.800178°E
6937		Rarnerchumma, Kapelle Maria vom Guten Rat		628.128	129.618	46.317371°N 7.803824°E
6943		St. German, Kirche St. German	Dorfstrasse 9	629.450	129.057	46.312268°N 7.820951°E
6944		St. German, Tscherggenhaus		628.950	129.020	46.311957°N 7.814458°E
6945		St. German, Vogelhaus		628.950	129.020	46.311957°N 7.814458°E
6946		Zentriegenhaus	Oberdorfgasse 11	627.908	129.031	46.3121°N 7.800932°E

== Reckingen-Gluringen ==
KGS No.^{?}	Picture	Name	Street Address	CH1903 X coordinate	CH1903 Y coordinate	Location
6950		Gemeindehaus (Burgerhaus)	Hof 1	661.682	146.805	46.469729°N 8.241717°E
6951		Haus Konrad Carlen	Oberdorf 3	661.610	146.965	46.471175°N 8.240801°E
6952	Kapelle Heiliges Kreuz im Blinnental	Kapelle Heiliges Kreuz im Blinnental		662.755	146.157	46.4638°N 8.255598°E
6954		Taffinerhaus	Oberdorf 7	661.645	146.966	46.47118°N 8.241257°E

== Riddes ==
KGS No.^{?}	Picture	Name	Street Address	CH1903 X coordinate	CH1903 Y coordinate	Location
6955	Ancienne église St-Laurent	Ancienne église St-Laurent		583.130	113.030	46.16853°N 7.220212°E
6956	La Vidondée	La Vidondée	Rue de la Vidonnée 4	583.525	113.350	46.171418°N 7.225315°E

== Riederalp ==
KGS No.^{?}	Picture	Name	Street Address	CH1903 X coordinate	CH1903 Y coordinate	Location
6959		Riederfurka, Villa Cassel		644.440	136.300	46.376597°N 8.016235°E

== Saas-Balen ==
KGS No.^{?}	Picture	Name	Street Address	CH1903 X coordinate	CH1903 Y coordinate	Location
6969		Kapelle St. Antonius		638.050	109.780	46.138432°N 7.931023°E

== Saas-Fee ==
KGS No.^{?}	Picture	Name	Street Address	CH1903 X coordinate	CH1903 Y coordinate	Location
6970	Kapelle zur Hohen Stiege, mit Kapellenweg	Kapelle zur Hohen Stiege, mit Kapellenweg		638.300	106.650	46.110262°N 7.934002°E

== Saas-Grund ==
KGS No.^{?}	Picture	Name	Street Address	CH1903 X coordinate	CH1903 Y coordinate	Location
6971		Gebäude mit wassergetriebenen Anlagen		638.550	109.060	46.131927°N 7.937434°E
6972		Kapelle Hl. Dreifaltigkeit		638.450	108.980	46.131213°N 7.936133°E
6973		Kirche St. Bartholomäus (Ausstattung)		638.500	108.180	46.124014°N 7.936714°E
6974	Rippenhelm des ehemaligen Kirchturms	Rippenhelm des ehemaligen Kirchturms		638.560	108.090	46.123201°N 7.937483°E

== Saillon ==
KGS No.^{?}	Picture	Name	Street Address	CH1903 X coordinate	CH1903 Y coordinate	Location
10578	Maison d'habitation / Wohnhaus	Maison d'habitation / Wohnhaus	Route de la Salentze 45	581.100	114.190	46.178911°N 7.193882°E

== Saint-Gingolph ==
KGS No.^{?}	Picture	Name	Street Address	CH1903 X coordinate	CH1903 Y coordinate	Location
7096		Ancien Hôtel de la Croix-Blanche (gendarmerie)	Route de la Croix-Blanche 2	551.220	138.100	46.392488°N 6.804445°E
7097		Chapelle de la Ste-Famille		551.181	138.111	46.392584°N 6.803937°E
7098		Château (maison de commune)		551.210	138.130	46.392757°N 6.804312°E
10703		Musée des Traditions et des Barques du Léman		551.211	138.127	46.39273°N 6.804325°E

== Saint-Maurice ==
KGS No.^{?}	Picture	Name	Street Address	CH1903 X coordinate	CH1903 Y coordinate	Location
9374		Bibliothèque de l'Abbaye de Saint-Maurice	Avenue d'Agaune 15	566.421	118.724	46.219124°N 7.003466°E
9375	Bibliothèque du couvent des capucins de St-Maurice	Bibliothèque du couvent des capucins de St-Maurice	Rue St-François 10	566.581	118.776	46.2196°N 7.005536°E
7119		Couvent et église des Capucins	Rue Saint-François 10	566.580	118.770	46.219546°N 7.005523°E
7120		Eglise St-Sigismond et cure		566.380	118.530	46.217377°N 7.002948°E
7121		Ermitage Notre-Dame du Scex		565.960	118.410	46.216277°N 6.997514°E
7122		Gare et rotonde pour locomotives		566.200	118.480	46.216918°N 7.000619°E
7124	Hospice et chapelle St-Jacques	Hospice et chapelle St-Jacques	Avenue du Simplon 1	566.510	118.500	46.217114°N 7.004635°E
9084	Kaserne	Kaserne		567.044	118.391	46.21616°N 7.011563°E
7126	La Gloriette	La Gloriette	Rue Joseph-Hyacinthe Barman 4	566.655	118.578	46.217823°N 7.006509°E
7127	Maison de Bons	Maison de Bons	Grand-Rue 48	566.530	118.730	46.219184°N 7.004878°E
7128		Vérolliez, chapelle St-Maurice (champ des Martyrs)		566.416	117.197	46.205388°N 7.003511°E

== Salgesch ==
KGS No.^{?}	Picture	Name	Street Address	CH1903 X coordinate	CH1903 Y coordinate	Location
6977	Kapelle Sieben Schmerzen Mariä, auf dem Hubel	Kapelle Sieben Schmerzen Mariä, auf dem Hubel		610.240	128.470	46.307555°N 7.571559°E

== Salvan ==
KGS No.^{?}	Picture	Name	Street Address	CH1903 X coordinate	CH1903 Y coordinate	Location
6981		Les trois ponts		565.963	105.911	46.103843°N 6.998461°E
6982		Pierres gravées		567.700	107.750	46.120471°N 7.020798°E

== Saxon ==
KGS No.^{?}	Picture	Name	Street Address	CH1903 X coordinate	CH1903 Y coordinate	Location
6987		Ancien Casino des Bains	Rue du Casino 4	579.313	110.582	46.146403°N 7.170899°E
6989		Ruine de l'ancienne église		579.830	110.200	46.142982°N 7.177607°E
6990		Tour ronde médiévale		579.850	110.120	46.142263°N 7.177869°E
10580		Villa de la famille Fama	Route du Léman 3	579.400	110.720	46.147647°N 7.172019°E

== Sembrancher ==
KGS No.^{?}	Picture	Name	Street Address	CH1903 X coordinate	CH1903 Y coordinate	Location
6996	Chapelle St-Jean et site archéologique	Chapelle St-Jean et site archéologique		577.654	102.574	46.074314°N 7.14981°E
6997		Crettaz-Polet, site et nécropole préhistorique		577.250	102.900	46.077233°N 7.144572°E
6998	Eglise St-Etienne (clocher)	Eglise St-Etienne (clocher)		577.710	103.010	46.078238°N 7.150513°E
6999	Hôpital	Hôpital		577.535	103.067	46.078745°N 7.148248°E
7000	Maison Luder	Maison Luder	Rue Principale 26	577.730	103.030	46.078419°N 7.15077°E
7001	Moulin d'Allèves	Moulin d'Allèves		578.050	103.120	46.079239°N 7.154903°E

== Sierre ==
KGS No.^{?}	Picture	Name	Street Address	CH1903 X coordinate	CH1903 Y coordinate	Location
7002		Chapelle St-Ginier		606.210	126.900	46.293481°N 7.519226°E
7003		Château Bellevue (Hôtel de Ville)	Rue du Bourg 14	607.370	126.850	46.293019°N 7.534279°E
7004		Château de Villa	Rue Saint-Catherine 2	606.370	126.970	46.294109°N 7.521303°E
7005	Château des Vidomnes	Château des Vidomnes	Rue du Bourg 24	607.420	126.880	46.293289°N 7.534928°E
10611	Clinique Sainte-Claire	Clinique Sainte-Claire	Rue de Plantzette 51	607.820	126.460	46.289506°N 7.540112°E
8747		Collection d'étains	Hôtel de Ville, Rue du Bourg 14	607.370	126.850	46.293019°N 7.534279°E
7008		Eglise Notre-Dame des Marais	Rue de Tservetta 317	607.340	127.060	46.294909°N 7.533893°E
7009		Eglise Ste-Catherine	Rue du Bourg 315	607.519	126.914	46.293594°N 7.536214°E
7010	Géronde, couvent, église et site	Géronde, couvent, église et site	Chemin des Bernardines 53	608.020	125.940	46.284826°N 7.542698°E
7011		Géronde, ruine de la chapelle St-Félix		608.190	126.080	46.286083°N 7.544907°E
7012		Granges, colline des châteaux		602.100	122.990	46.258334°N 7.465872°E
7013		Granges, puits		601.820	123.020	46.258604°N 7.462241°E
7014		Grottes de Géronde		608.120	125.780	46.283386°N 7.543993°E
7015		Maison de Chastonay / Glarey	Route du Simplon 35	608.010	127.290	46.29697°N 7.542592°E
7016		Maison Pancrace de Courten et archives de la fondation R. M. Rilke	Rue du Bourg 30	607.590	126.980	46.294186°N 7.537136°E
10704		Musée valaisan de la vigne et du vin	Rue Sainte-Catherine 6	606.386	126.927	46.293722°N 7.52151°E
7018		Tour de Goubing	Chemin de Goubing 24	607.910	127.050	46.294812°N 7.54129°E

== Simplon ==
KGS No.^{?}	Picture	Name	Street Address	CH1903 X coordinate	CH1903 Y coordinate	Location
7021	Alpe Hopsche	Alpe Hopsche		644.900	122.350	46.251082°N 8.020868°E
7024		Engi, alter Sustbau		645.810	118.995	46.220841°N 8.032339°E
14952	Hospiz auf dem Simplonpass	Hospiz auf dem Simplonpass		645.550	121.840	46.24645°N 8.029247°E
7031		Kirche St. Gotthard		647.670	116.230	46.19584°N 8.056162°E
7032	Napoleonskaserne in der Gondoschlucht ("Alte Kaserne")	Napoleonskaserne in der Gondoschlucht ("Alte Kaserne")		650.420	115.180	46.186195°N 8.091671°E

== Sion ==
KGS No.^{?}	Picture	Name	Street Address	CH1903 X coordinate	CH1903 Y coordinate	Location
7046		Ancien collège (Palais de Justice)	Avenue de le Gare 40	593.700	120.300	46.234109°N 7.356969°E
7047		Ancien hôpital des bourgeois	Rue de la Dixence 10	594.160	119.930	46.230785°N 7.362937°E
7048		Ancienne Auberge de la Croix-Blanche		593.900	120.220	46.233391°N 7.359563°E
7049		Ancienne auberge du Lion d'Or	Rue du Grand-Pont 6	593.980	120.240	46.233572°N 7.3606°E
7050		Ancienne pharmacie Uffembort (fresque)		594.020	120.185	46.233078°N 7.361119°E
7051		Ancienne Préfecture du Département du Simplon (maison de Kalbermatten)	Rue de Lausanne 7	593.940	120.120	46.232492°N 7.360083°E
8918		Archiv des Kapuzinerklosters Sitten		593.840	120.700	46.237709°N 7.358779°E
7033		Archives du Chapitre	Rue Mathieu-Schiner 5	593.850	120.340	46.23447°N 7.358913°E
8889		Archives municipales de Sion	Rue de la Tour 14	593.810	120.229	46.233472°N 7.358396°E
7052		Arsenal	Rue de Lausanne 45	593.560	119.960	46.231049°N 7.355159°E
9373		Bibliothèque du Chapitre cathédral de Sion	Rue de la Cathédrale 1	593.908	120.268	46.233823°N 7.359666°E
7034		Bibliothèque et Archives cantonales	Rue des Vergers 7	593.822	120.028	46.231664°N 7.358555°E
7053	Bramois, Ermitage de Longeborgne et collection d'ex-voto	Bramois, Ermitage de Longeborgne et collection d'ex-voto	Chemin de Longeborgne 11	597.720	119.175	46.224015°N 7.409087°E
7055		Bramois, pont et chapelle		597.180	119.770	46.229365°N 7.402084°E
7056		Casino	Rue du Grand-Pont 4	593.990	120.210	46.233302°N 7.36073°E
7057	Chapelle de Tous-les-Saints	Chapelle de Tous-les-Saints		594.340	120.360	46.234655°N 7.365265°E
7036		Chemin des Collines, menhirs et zone archéologique		593.530	120.090	46.232219°N 7.354769°E
10617		Ecole	Rue de la Colline 31	593.401	120.044	46.231804°N 7.353097°E
7059		Eglise du collège (Ste-Trinité)		594.090	120.220	46.233393°N 7.362026°E
7060		Fontaine du Lion		593.960	120.330	46.234382°N 7.360339°E
13922		Grange-à-l'Evêche (Musée cantonale d'archéologie)	Rue des Châteuax 12	594.080	120.320	46.234293°N 7.361895°E
7039		Grange-à-l'Evêque (Musée cantonal d'archéologie)	Rue des Châteaux 12	594.080	120.320	46.234293°N 7.361895°E
7061		Grenette	Rue du Grand-Pont 22	593.980	120.320	46.234292°N 7.360599°E
10613		Maison Bagaïni	Avenue de Tourbillon 36	594.230	119.750	46.229166°N 7.363847°E
7062		Maison de la Cible	Rue du Tunnel 4	594.110	120.420	46.235192°N 7.362283°E
7063		Maison de la Diète	Rue du Vieux-Collège 1	594.040	120.280	46.233932°N 7.361377°E
10616	Maison d'habitation	Maison d'habitation	Rue du Rawyl 9	593.938	120.602	46.236828°N 7.360051°E
7064		Maison du Chapitre (Calendes)	Place de la Cathédrale 1	593.920	120.270	46.233841°N 7.359822°E
7065	Maison du Diable	Maison du Diable	Rue des Creusets 31	593.800	119.690	46.228623°N 7.358274°E
7066		Molignon, chapelle Ste-Anne		596.560	122.080	46.250142°N 7.394031°E
7067		Montorge, ruines du château		591.970	119.910	46.230583°N 7.33455°E
10621		Moulin de Sion	Rue Sainte-Marguerite 14	594.378	119.793	46.229555°N 7.365765°E
7068	Musée de la Nature	Musée de la Nature	Avenue de la Gare 42	593.670	120.320	46.234289°N 7.35658°E
8765		Musée de la Nature	Avenue de la Gare 42	593.670	120.320	46.234289°N 7.35658°E
7069	Palais du Gouvernement	Palais du Gouvernement	Place de la Planta 3	593.810	120.200	46.233211°N 7.358397°E
7070		Palais épiscopal et archives épiscopales	Rue de la Tour 12	593.790	120.260	46.23375°N 7.358137°E
7071		Pénitencier cantonal (ancienne chancellerie d'Etat)	Rue des Châteaux 22	594.170	120.370	46.234743°N 7.363061°E
7073		Rempart de la rue des Tonneliers		594.020	120.420	46.235192°N 7.361116°E
7076		Sous-le-Scex (zone archéologique)		594.150	120.150	46.232764°N 7.362805°E
7077		Théâtre	Rue du Vieux-Collège 22	594.100	120.260	46.233753°N 7.362155°E
7078	Tour des Sorciers	Tour des Sorciers		593.751	120.380	46.234829°N 7.35763°E
7079		Tour et rempart (fragment)		594.100	120.170	46.232943°N 7.362156°E
10620	Usine EOS	Usine EOS	Chandoline, Rue de la Dixence 76	595.080	119.040	46.222786°N 7.374872°E
7080		Vestiges de l'enceinte orientale de la ville		594.640	120.400	46.235017°N 7.369154°E
10612		Villa Veuillet	Chemin des Amandiers 30	593.166	120.170	46.232935°N 7.350049°E

== Staldenried ==
KGS No.^{?}	Picture	Name	Street Address	CH1903 X coordinate	CH1903 Y coordinate	Location
7093		Gspon, Kapelle St. Anna		635.826	119.349	46.224631°N 7.902976°E

== Trient ==
KGS No.^{?}	Picture	Name	Street Address	CH1903 X coordinate	CH1903 Y coordinate	Location
13924		Alpage des Herbagères		564.260	976.80	50.11157°N 12.701724°E
7137		Eglise St-Bernard et environs		565.650	100.600	46.056053°N 6.994802°E

== Troistorrents ==
KGS No.^{?}	Picture	Name	Street Address	CH1903 X coordinate	CH1903 Y coordinate	Location
7138	Chemex, chapelle des Rois-Mages (autel)	Chemex, chapelle des Rois-Mages (autel)		560.880	121.660	46.245236°N 6.931413°E
7139		Eglise Ste-Marie-Madeleine (autels)		559.910	119.940	46.229707°N 6.918984°E
7142		Moulins de la Tine		559.836	120.068	46.230854°N 6.918013°E
7140		Pont sur le Fayot		558.680	118.715	46.218613°N 6.903149°E
7141		Propéra, grenier et four à pain	Chemin du Batieux 6	560.908	122.020	46.248476°N 6.931745°E

== Vernayaz ==
KGS No.^{?}	Picture	Name	Street Address	CH1903 X coordinate	CH1903 Y coordinate	Location
7166	Grand Hôtel	Grand Hôtel	Grand Rue 1	569.420	109.010	46.131886°N 7.042966°E
7167		Gueuroz, Pont sur le Trient		569.192	108.687	46.12897°N 7.040037°E

== Vex ==
KGS No.^{?}	Picture	Name	Street Address	CH1903 X coordinate	CH1903 Y coordinate	Location
7171		Ancienne église St-Sylve		597.225	118.259	46.215773°N 7.402677°E
7172		Bramois, usine hydroélectrique		597.450	119.340	46.225498°N 7.405586°E
7173	Chalet sur la place (magasin Coop)	Chalet sur la place (magasin Coop)	Route de la Lay 1	596.850	117.780	46.211463°N 7.39782°E
7174		Riva, pont de pierre		598.030	115.610	46.191947°N 7.41312°E

== Veyras ==
KGS No.^{?}	Picture	Name	Street Address	CH1903 X coordinate	CH1903 Y coordinate	Location
7176		Chapelle St-François		607.577	127.899	46.302454°N 7.536982°E
7177		Musot, chapelle Ste-Marie		607.787	128.425	46.307183°N 7.539717°E
7178		Musot, tour médiévale (Rilke)	Route du Moulin 6	607.820	128.340	46.306418°N 7.540144°E

== Vionnaz ==
KGS No.^{?}	Picture	Name	Street Address	CH1903 X coordinate	CH1903 Y coordinate	Location
7179		Ancien clocher		558.439	128.784	46.309172°N 6.899129°E
7180		Digue avec inscription et armoiries		558.320	128.566	46.307204°N 6.897604°E
7181		Maison forte Barberini	Rue du Château 16	558.500	128.830	46.30959°N 6.899917°E

== Visp ==
KGS No.^{?}	Picture	Name	Street Address	CH1903 X coordinate	CH1903 Y coordinate	Location
7184	Burgerkirche Hl. Drei Könige mit Burgerarchiv	Burgerkirche Hl. Drei Könige mit Burgerarchiv		634.100	126.640	46.290306°N 7.881139°E
7185	Eyholz, Burgerhaus (mit Pergola)	Eyholz, Burgerhaus (mit Pergola)	Grundacherstrasse 19	636.450	127.060	46.293961°N 7.911666°E
7186		Eyholz, Riti, Kapelle Mariä Himmelfahrt		637.020	127.310	46.296179°N 7.919083°E
7192		Kirche St. Martin		634.100	126.500	46.289047°N 7.881129°E
7195	Pflanzetta	Pflanzetta	St. Jodernstrasse 7	634.199	126.345	46.287647°N 7.882402°E
7196		Schützenlaube		634.050	126.690	46.290758°N 7.880494°E

== Visperterminen ==
KGS No.^{?}	Picture	Name	Street Address	CH1903 X coordinate	CH1903 Y coordinate	Location
7197		Altäre der Kirche St. Theodul		635.630	123.070	46.258113°N 7.90072°E

== Vouvry ==
KGS No.^{?}	Picture	Name	Street Address	CH1903 X coordinate	CH1903 Y coordinate	Location
7213		Château de la Porte-du-Sex		557.530	133.200	46.348839°N 6.886927°E
7214		Eglise St-Hippolyte et clocher		557.440	131.700	46.335341°N 6.885895°E
7215		Hôtel de Ville	Grand-Rue 25	557.680	131.740	46.335715°N 6.889008°E
7216		Maison de la Tour	Grand-Rue 18	557.670	131.780	46.336075°N 6.888874°E

== Zeneggen ==
KGS No.^{?}	Picture	Name	Street Address	CH1903 X coordinate	CH1903 Y coordinate	Location
7220	Kastel, bronzezeitliche Höhensiedlung	Kastel, bronzezeitliche Höhensiedlung		632.300	124.600	46.272044°N 7.85764°E
7221	Nothelferkapelle auf dem Biel	Nothelferkapelle auf dem Biel		632.790	124.780	46.27364°N 7.864009°E

== Zermatt ==
KGS No.^{?}	Picture	Name	Street Address	CH1903 X coordinate	CH1903 Y coordinate	Location
7223		Kapelle St. Jakob		625.300	955.50	50.670675°N 12.458804°E
7225	Kirche St. Mauritius (Altäre mit Taufstein)	Kirche St. Mauritius (Altäre mit Taufstein)		623.850	964.80	50.652299°N 12.588511°E
7226		Winkelmatten, Kapelle der Hl. Familie		623.750	957.70	50.655535°N 12.488413°E

== Zwischbergen ==
KGS No.^{?}	Picture	Name	Street Address	CH1903 X coordinate	CH1903 Y coordinate	Location
7230		Gondo, Kirche St. Markus		654.210	116.270	46.195705°N 8.140882°E
7231	Gondo, Sust von Stockalper	Gondo, Sust von Stockalper		654.170	116.285	46.195843°N 8.140366°E

== See also ==
- List of cultural property of national significance in Switzerland: Valais
