= Leuk Castle =

Castle in Leuk, Switzerland

- Leuk in Switzerland
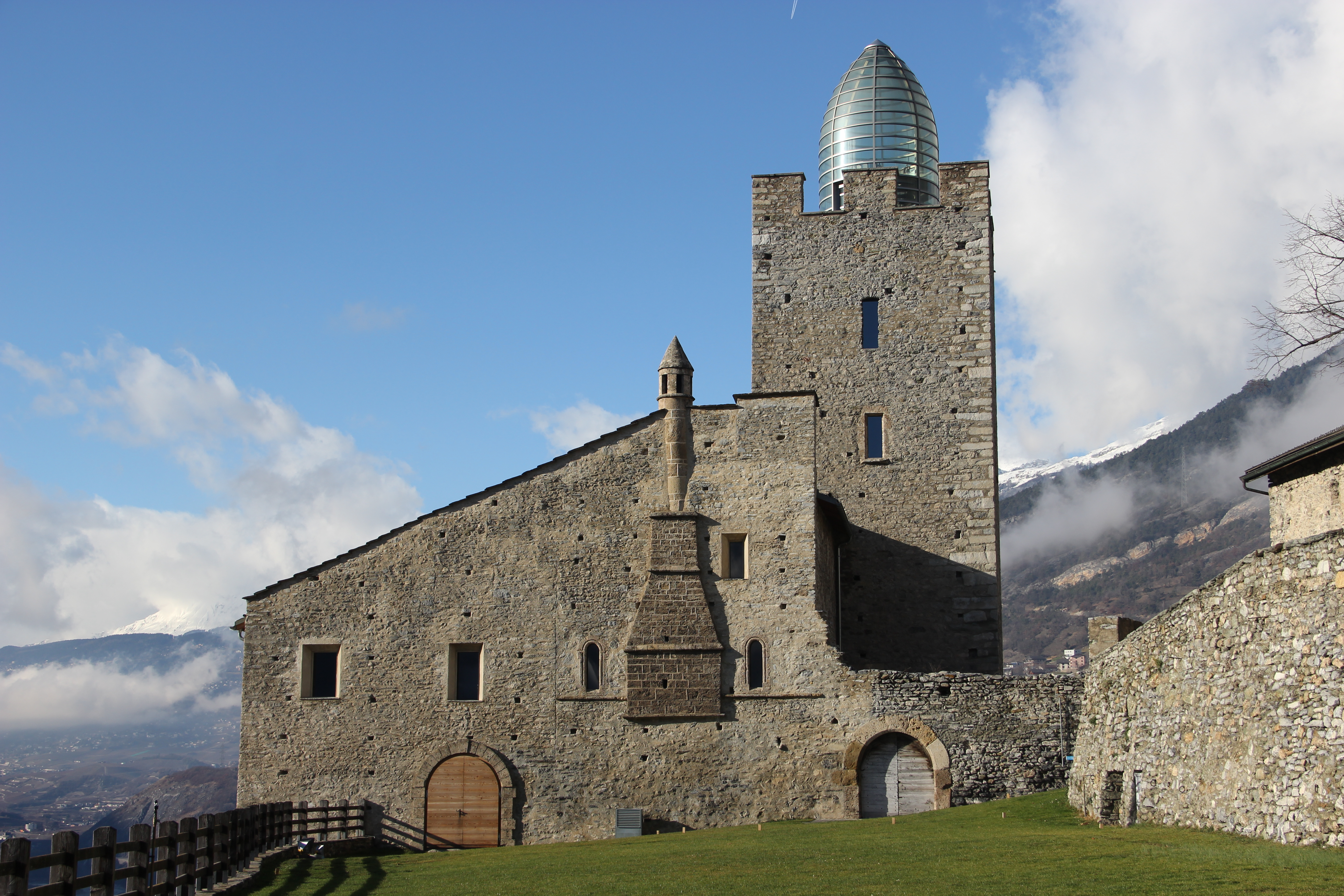
- Leuk Castle

Location
- Coordinates: 46°18′58″N 7°38′02″E

Site history
- Built: 13th century

Leuk Castle or Bishop's Castle is a castle in the municipality of Leuk of the Canton of Valais in Switzerland.

== History ==
The castle was originally built in the 13th century above the road from the Rhone valley over the Gemmi Pass. It was built about 60 meters (200 ft) west of the 12th century Viztum Tower, which had been built to guard the road. During the 12th century, the Bishop of Sion had gradually expanded his power in Valais. The local noble Leuk family built a small fort that was the foundation of the current castle. At the beginning of the 13th century they were forced to donate their lands in Leuk to the Bishop of Sion. They were then granted Leuk as a fief to hold for the bishop. Soon thereafter the Leuk family vanishes from the historical record. Around this time, the Bishop of Sion expanded the small castle into a much larger building that served as a home and administrative center. The fief of Leuk passed through the Ayent family, the Blonay and then around 1350 the Raron family.

== Castle site ==
The main tower is square tower with about 9 meters (30 ft) long sides. The tower is surrounded by an irregular ring wall. The complex includes two rectangular residential buildings. The tower was probably built in the 12th century while the residential buildings are from the early to mid 13th century.

== See also ==
- List of castles in Switzerland
- Château
