= Glérolles Castle =

Castle in Saint-Saphorin, Switzerland

- Château de Glérolles
- Near Saint-Saphorin in Switzerland
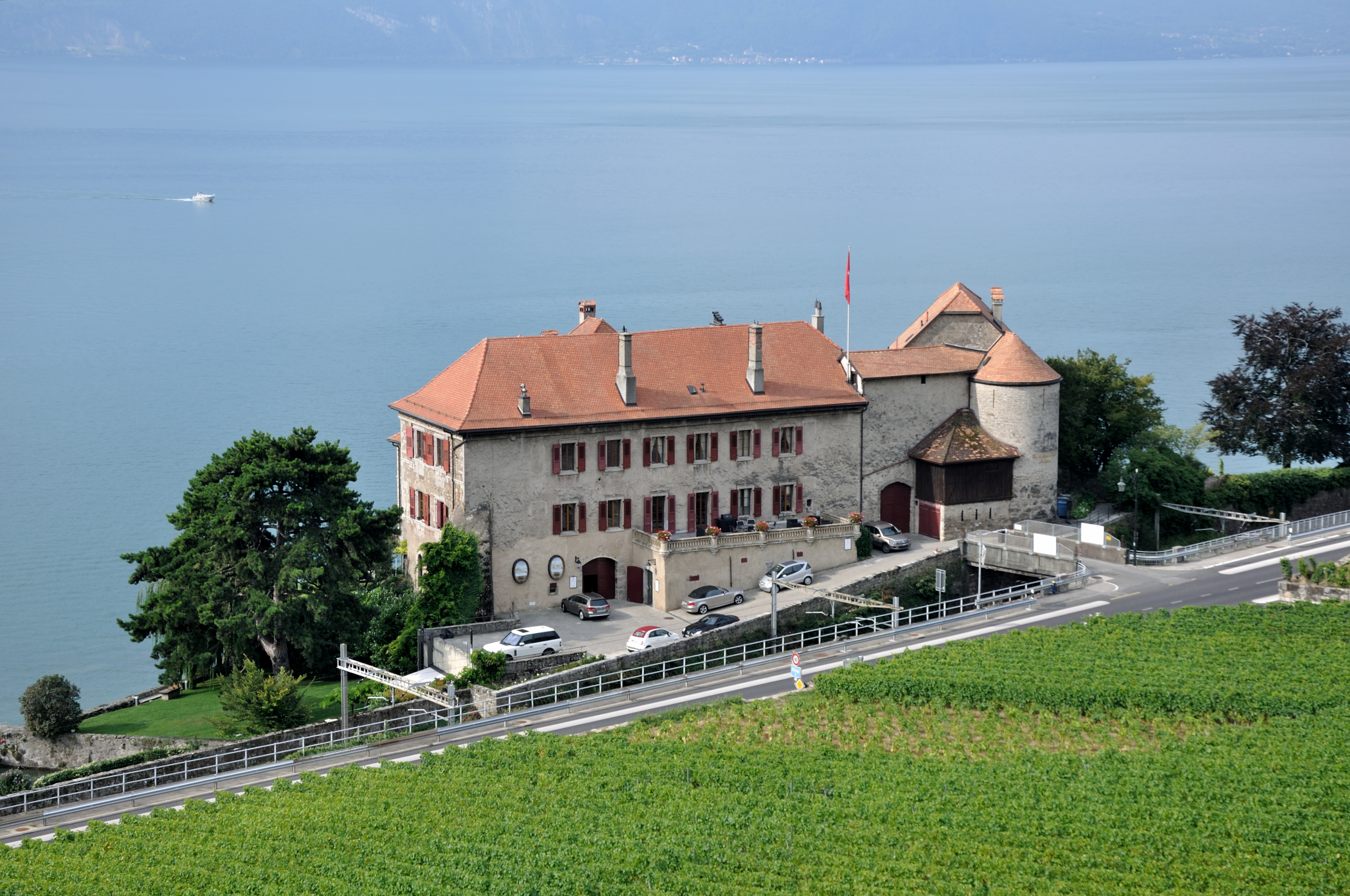
- Château de Glérolles

Site information
- Open to the public: Yes
- Website: https://www.glerolles.ch

Location
- Coordinates: 46°28′28″N 6°47′13″E
- Height: c. 12 m (39 ft)

Site history
- Built: c. 1150
- Events: Bernese invasion of Vaud (1536)

Glérolles Castle (French: Château de Glérolles) is situated in the municipality of Saint-Saphorin, canton of Vaud, Switzerland, on the northern shore of Lake Geneva. Its earliest elements date from a fortress built around 1150. The modern building serves as the headquarters for a vineyard of the same name, and as a venue which can be hired to host social events. It is a Swiss Cultural Property of Regional Significance.

== History ==
Glerula or Calarona (from Latin: glarea, 'gravel') was a Gallo-Roman village. The chroniclers Gregory of Tours and Marius of Avenches described what is now called the Tauredunum event of 563. A landslip into the eastern end of Lake Geneva caused a tsunami which swept along the lake causing immense damage. Glerula was among the villages which were destroyed. It was never rebuilt. Instead, a new community was founded a short distance to the east, taking its name from the new church there, dedicated to Saint-Symphorien. That name has, with the passage of years, transformed into Saint-Saphorin.

The end of the 11th century and the start of the 12th were marked by the Investiture Controversy. That turned on whether or not secular rulers had the right to appoint clergymen to senior positions such as bishoprics. In 1076, as part of this quarrel, Pope Gregory VII excommunicated Henry IV, Holy Roman Emperor. The Emperor crossed the Alps by way of the Great St Bernard Pass to seek out the Pope at Canossa, where in January 1077 he did public penance and had his sentence of excommunication lifted. He was accompanied by Burkhard von Oltigen, Bishop of Lausanne, who too had been excommunicated. On his return, Henry gave the region of Lavaux (which includes Glérolles) to the Diocese of Lausanne.

In 1150 or around 1160, the Bishop of Lausanne built a keep on the site of the former Glerula, to guard a narrow part of the road between Lausanne and Vevey. The first documentary mention of the castle is in about 1270 or in 1271, when Bishop Jean de Cossonay gave it as a feoffment to Hugo de Palézieux. Around 1300 or in 1303, the diocese reclaimed its rights. The fortifications of Glérolles were improved. The castle served a civil as well as a military purpose. It is recorded that several gangs of brigands were captured near Glérolles and were executed there. On the first floor, there was a device called la cage aux sorcières ('the witches' cage'), a sort of large chest made of thick planks reinforced inside and outside with iron, and having a grille which allowed anyone confined within it only the minimum of air and light. In the late 15th and early 16th centuries, Bishops Aymon de Montfalcon and Sébastien de Montfalcon made further improvements to the fortifications. The castle acquired the nickname of "the Chillon of Lavaux". In 1531, the castle lent 10 cannons to the town of Vevey, to fire salutes upon the arrival and departure of the visiting Charles III, Duke of Savoy.

In 1536, the Calvinist German-speaking city-state of Bern invaded Catholic French-speaking Vaud, and subjugated it. Bishop Sébastien organised a defence from Glérolles; but was unsuccessful, and fled. In 1798, the Vaudois rose up against their Bernese overlords; and, assisted by the French, threw them out, and established the Lemanic Republic. Grérolles Castle became the property of the people. In 1803, the Emperor Napoleon established the Swiss Confederation, under which Vaud was elevated to the status of a canton. The cantonal authorities promptly sold the castle into private hands. Its ownership has since changed several times. During the 19th and 20th centuries, it was converted from a fortress into a more elegant dwelling. When the castle was sold in 2010, the price was not disclosed, but has been estimated at 15-20 million Swiss francs.

== Description ==
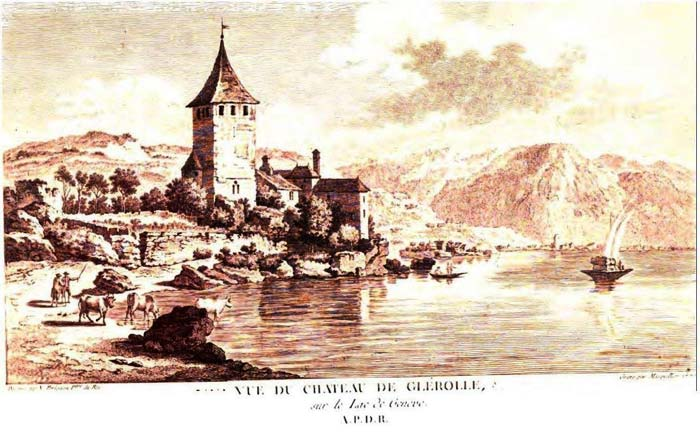
Vue de Chateau de Glérolle, 1784

Few elements of the mediaeval fortress survive. A 1784 engraving by Jean-Benjamin de La Borde shows a building with a tall quadrangular central tower capped by a pyramidal roof. There is a legend that the tower was demolished in the 19th century because it was casting shade over the vineyard. Although that story does lend support to the idea of a long-standing close connection between castle and vineyard, it is untrue. The tower was halved in height because vibration from the newly built Simplon railway threatened to bring the whole structure down.

As of 2018, the castle comprises 30 rooms, including a meeting hall called La Salle des Chevaliers, and a garden facing onto Lake Geneva which includes a private dock. It is a Swiss Cultural Property of Regional Significance (List B, no. 6491).

== Vineyard ==
The vineyard consists of 5 hectares (12 acres) of terraces. The grape varieties include Chasselas (which is predominant), Pinot Noir, Gewürztraminer, Merlot, Cabernet Franc, Syrah and (as an unusual speciality) Humagne Rouge. The wines are entitled to be labelled AOC Saint-Saphorin (Lavaux).

The canton of Valais has had the sole privilege of growing Humagne Rouge. In or around the 1980s, the owner of the Glérolles vineyard planted some Humagne Rouge vines. The authorities ordered him to uproot them. He complained, heatedly, at high judicial levels, and his arguments prevailed. As of 2018, Glérolles is the only place in Switzerland outside Valais which has the right to make wine from Humagne Rouge grapes.

Wine made at Glérolles has won at least one award.

== Gallery ==
Some 20th and 21st century views of Glérolles Castle:

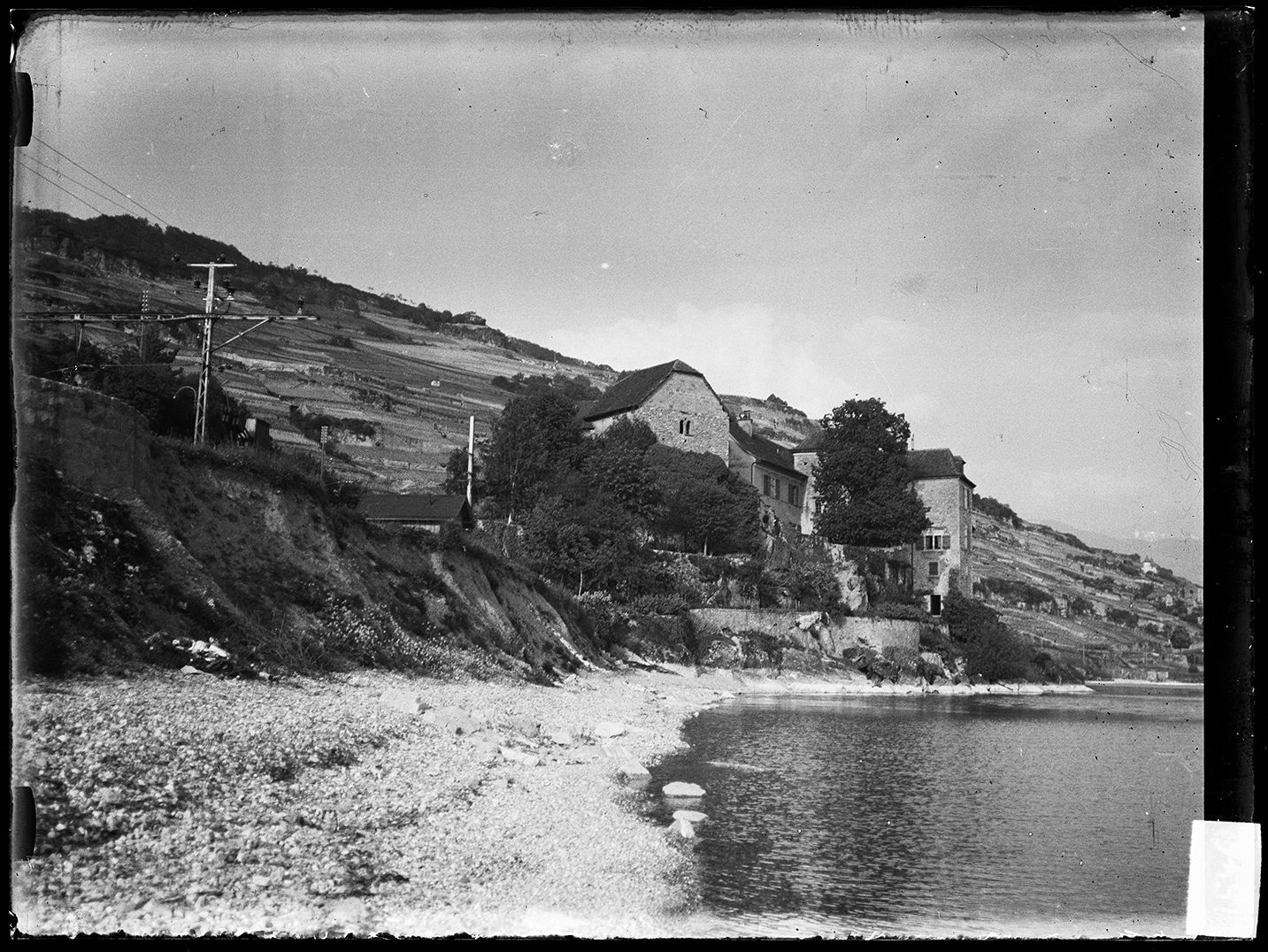
1901

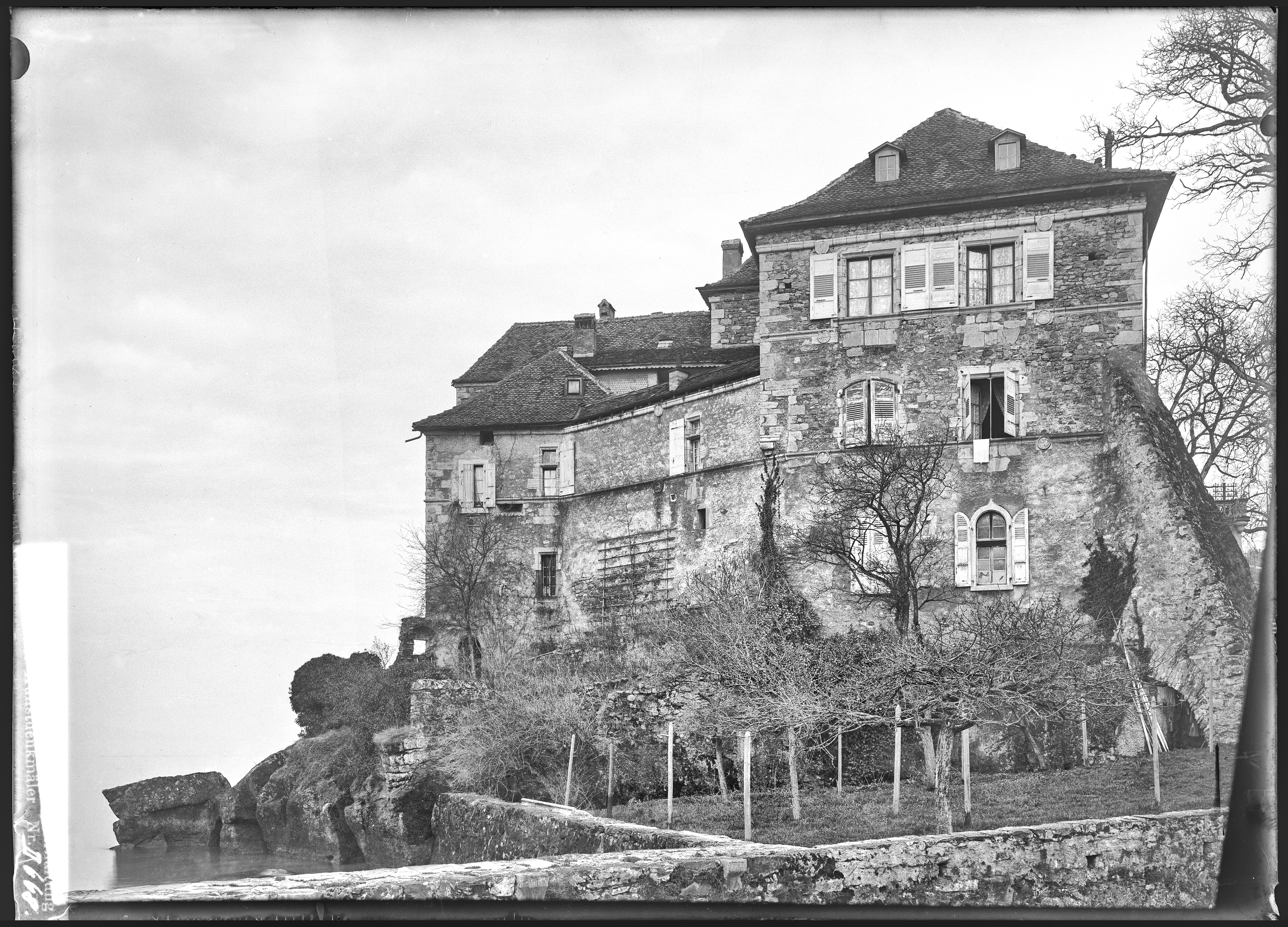
1901

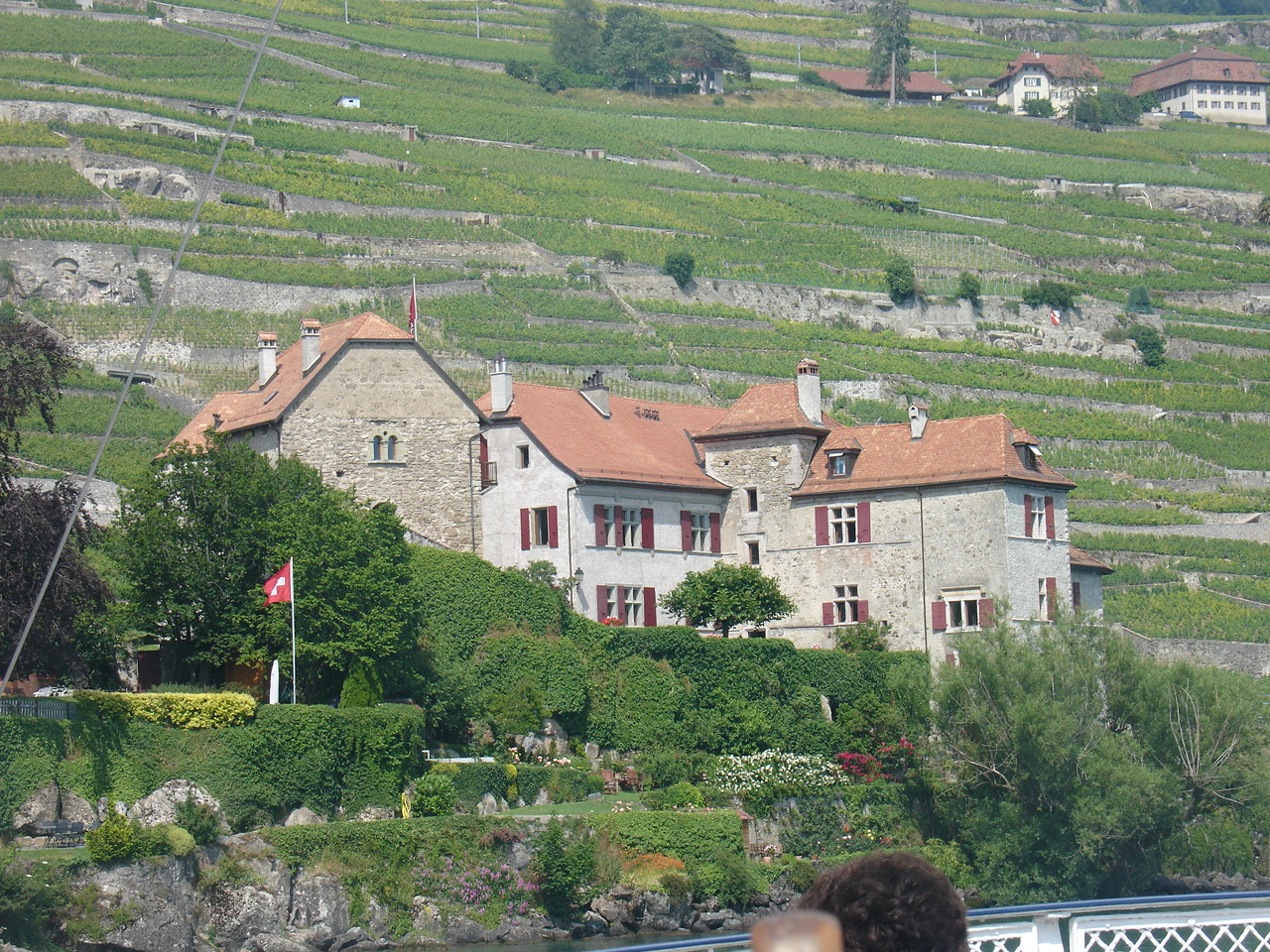
2006

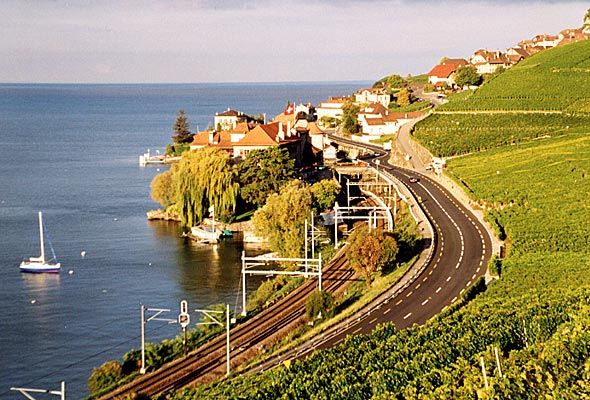
2008

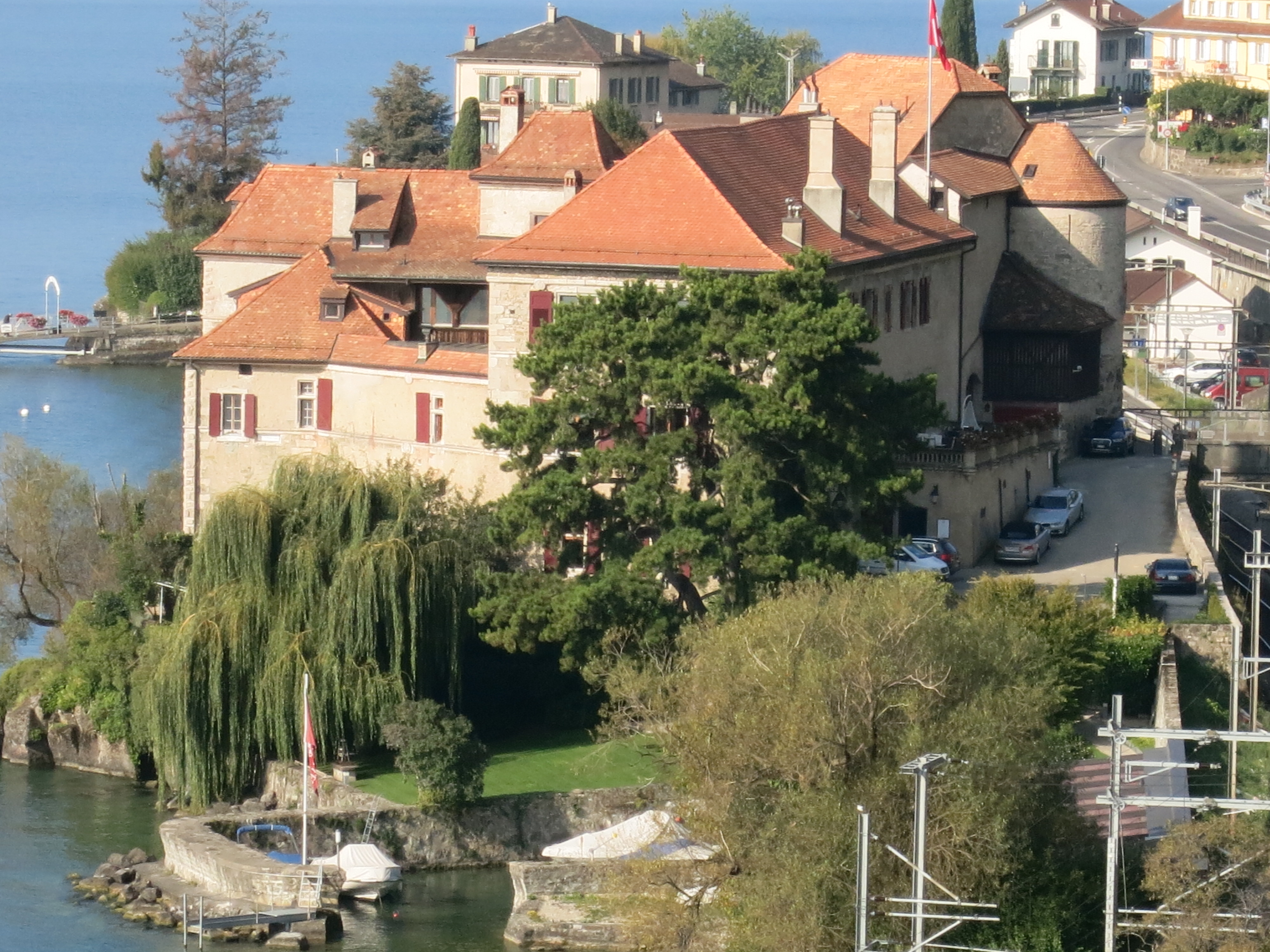
2014
