= Swiss coordinate system =

Geographic coordinate system

The Swiss coordinate system (or Swiss grid) is a geographic coordinate system used in Switzerland and Liechtenstein for maps and surveying by the Swiss Federal Office of Topography (Swisstopo).

A first coordinate system was introduced in 1903 under the name LV03 (Landesvermessung 1903, German for “land survey 1903”), based on the Mercator projection and the Bessel ellipsoid. With the advent of GPS technology, a new coordinate system was introduced in 1995 under the name LV95 (Landesvermessung 1995, German for “land survey 1995”) after a 7-year measurement campaign.

LV is translated as MN in English.

== LV03 ==
Introduced in 1903, this first geographic coordinate system rested upon the two dominant methodological pillars of geodesy and cartography at the time: the Bessel ellipsoid and the Mercator projection. Its measurements used the Bessel ellipsoid as an approximation of the Earth's shape, and its maps used the Mercator projection as a projection technique. Although not ideal, these approximations still offered a high level of precision in the case of Switzerland, due to the small size of its territory (41,285 km^{2} with max. 350 km lengthways and 220 km from North to South).

The fundamental reference point of the LV03 coordinate system was the old observatory of Bern, nowadays the location of the Institute of Exact Sciences of Bern University, in downtown Bern (Sidlerstrasse 5 - 46°57'3.9" N, 7°26'19.1" E). The coordinates of this reference point were arbitrarily fixed at 600'000 m E / 200'000 m N – with the East coordinate (E) noted before the North coordinate (N), unlike in the traditional latitude / longitude coordinate system. In selecting the values of these reference coordinates, the intention of the Swiss Federal Office of Topography was to guarantee that every point of the Swiss territory be identified by positive coordinates. The reference coordinates thus needed to be large enough to allow for positive coordinates to be allocated to the southernmost and westernmost areas of Switzerland. This goal was largely met by the 600'000 m E / 200'000 m N reference coordinates, as the corresponding origin point (0 m E / 0 m N) was located in Southwest France, near Bordeaux. In addition, the ratio between the East (E) and North (N) coordinates of the reference point was also set to be sufficiently high to guarantee that E coordinates be bigger than N coordinates over the entire Swiss territory.

Examples of LV03 coordinates

- Rigi E=679520, N=212273

- Zürich-Seebach E=684592, N=252857

== LV95 ==
With the advent of GPS technology, it became clear over the course of the 1980s that the LV03 coordinate system was no longer in a position to meet the rapidly growing precision standards set by new technologies. For instance, a difference of several meters was discovered when comparing the performance of LV03 and GPS technology in the measurement of the distance between the westernmost and easternmost areas of Switzerland (Geneva and Lower Engadin). As a result, the Swiss Federal Office of Topography decided to launch a new land survey campaign in 1988, with the intention of gathering precise data for the development of a new coordinate system based on WGS84. This survey ended in 1995, which is the reason why it was officially called LV95 (Landesvermessung 1995, German for “land survey 1995”).

The new coordinate system was designed with two main goals in mind: significantly increasing the precision of geographic coordinates, while at the same time preserving the conceptual foundations of the old LV03 for the sake of continuity. As such, the LV95 system continues to provide coordinates in the same order (East (E) before North (N)), and continues to allocate positive coordinates to every point of the Swiss territory.

In order to nonetheless achieve a clear distinction between the two systems, an additional digit was added to the coordinates of LV95: any East coordinate (E) now starts with a 2, and any North coordinate (N) with a 1. Consequently, LV95 coordinates are given by pairs of 7-digit numbers, whereas LV03 used pairs of 6-digit numbers – for instance the coordinates (2 600 000m E / 1 200 000m N) in LV95 would be expressed as (600 000m E / 200 000m N) in LV03.

Another significant difference lies in the location of the fundamental reference point of the two systems. Under the LV95 system, coordinates are no longer calculated by referring to the old observatory of Bern (as was the case under the LV03 system), but instead to the Zimmerwald Observatory, located outside of Bern (approximately 10 km to the South). Exact formulas used for the conversion of LV95 coordinates into latitude and longitude are provided by the Swiss Federal Office of Topography in its formal documentation of the LV95 system.

Although the new geographic coordinate system LV95 was introduced in 1995, it was only progressively brought to use by Swiss authorities, with the official deadline for its definitive implementation having been fixed for the year 2016. Nowadays the LV95 system has become the main geographic reference frame of various institutions and governmental agencies, such as the Federal Statistical Office, the Swiss Army and the Swiss Border Guard, as well as cantonal police corps, emergency services and cadastre offices. Likewise, the official National Maps of Switzerland are now also founded upon this new coordinate system.

== See also ==
- Swiss cartography
