= Turtmann-Unterems =

- Municipality
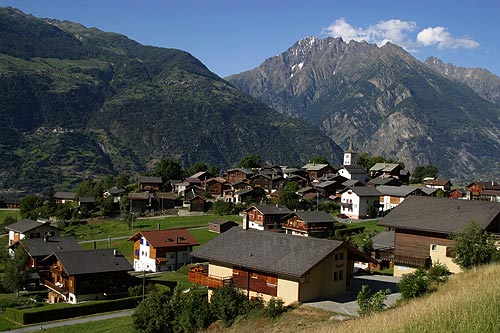
- Unterems village in Turtmann-Unterems
- Location of Turtmann-Unterems
- Location within Switzerland Location within Canton of Valais
- Coordinates: 46°17′N 7°42′E
- Country: Switzerland
- Canton: Valais
- District: Leuk

Government
  - Mayor: Johann Tscherrig

Area
  - Total: 1.4 km^{2} (0.54 sq mi)
- Elevation: 1,003 m (3,291 ft)
- Highest elevation (Massoltern): 1,200 m (3,900 ft)
- Lowest elevation: 800 m (2,600 ft)

Population (December 2007)
  - Total: 164
  - Density: 120/km^{2} (300/sq mi)
- Time zone: UTC+01:00 (CET)
  - Summer (DST): UTC+02:00 (CEST)
- Postal code: 3948/3946
- SFOS number: 6119
- ISO 3166 code: CH-VS
- Surrounded by: Agarn, Ergisch, Oberems, Turtmann
- Website: www.turtmann-unterems.ch

Turtmann-Unterems is a municipality in the district of Leuk in the canton of Valais in Switzerland. The municipalities of Turtmann and Unterems merged on 1 January 2013 into the new municipality of Turtmann-Unterems.

== Geography ==
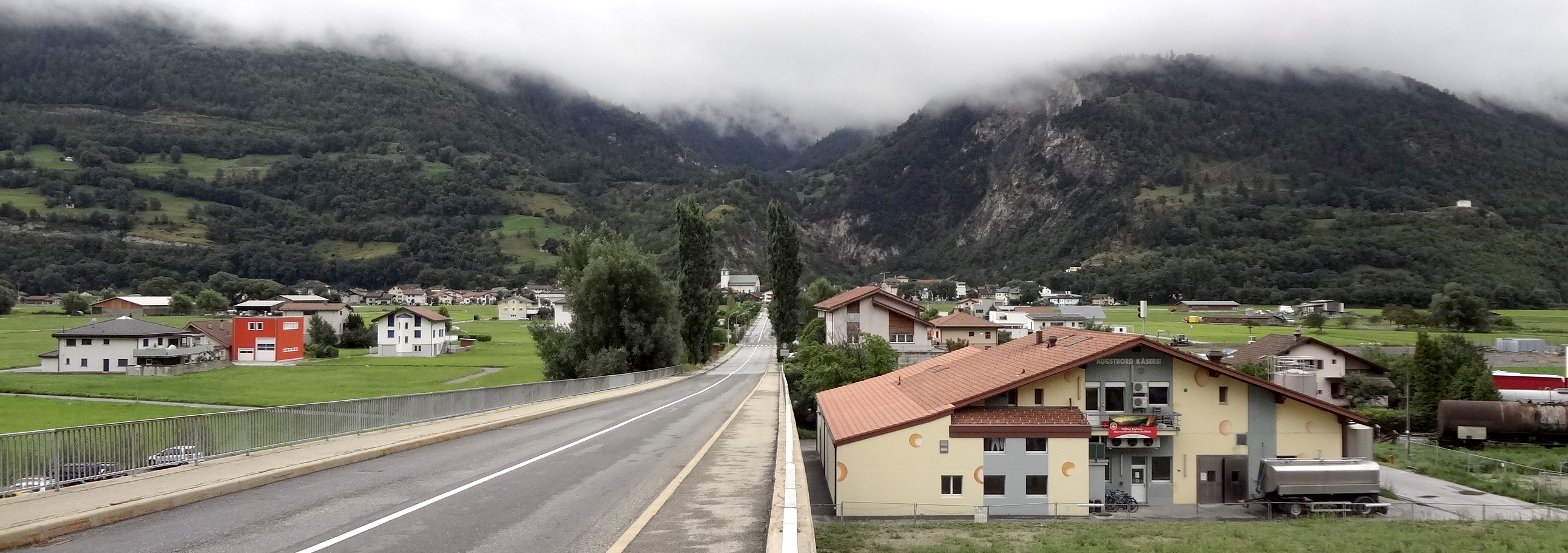
Turtmann village

Turtmann-Unterems had an area, (as of the 2004/09 survey) of 42.42 km^{2} (16.38 sq mi). Of this area, about 14.2% is used for agricultural purposes, while 12.4% is forested. Of the rest of the land, 3.1% is settled (buildings or roads) and 70.2% is unproductive land. Over the past two decades (1979/85-2004/09) the amount of land that is settled has increased by 27 ha (67 acres) and the agricultural land has decreased by 57 ha (140 acres).

Before the merger, Turtmann had an area, as of 2011, of 6.8 square kilometers (2.6 mi^{2}). Of this area, 46.2% is used for agricultural purposes, while 36.4% is forested. Of the rest of the land, 14.2% is settled (buildings or roads) and 3.2% is unproductive land. It was located in the Leuk district, south of the Rhone river down in the Rhone valley at the entrance to the Turtmann valley. It consists of the village of Turtmann and the hamlets of Tännu and Ried.

Before the merger, Unterems had an area, as of 2011, of 1.4 square kilometers (0.54 mi^{2}). Of this area, 39.1% is used for agricultural purposes, while 53.6% is forested. Of the rest of the land, 7.2% is settled (buildings or roads) and 0.0% is unproductive land. It was located in the Leuk district, high on the left side of the Rhone valley. It consists of the village of Unterems and the hamlets of Ze Schmidu, Feldishaus and Prupräsu.

== Demographics ==
Turtmann-Unterems has a population (as of December 2020) of 1,094. As of 2013, 10.1% of the population are resident foreign nationals. Over the last 3 years (2010-2013) the population has changed at a rate of -2.77%. The birth rate in the municipality, in 2013, was 14.2 while the death rate was 8.0 per thousand residents.

As of 2013, children and teenagers (0–19 years old) make up 17.4% of the population, while adults (20–64 years old) are 63.6% and seniors (over 64 years old) make up 18.9%.

== Historic Population ==
The historical population is given in the following chart:

== Sights ==
The entire village of Turtmann is designated as part of the Inventory of Swiss Heritage Sites.

== Economy ==
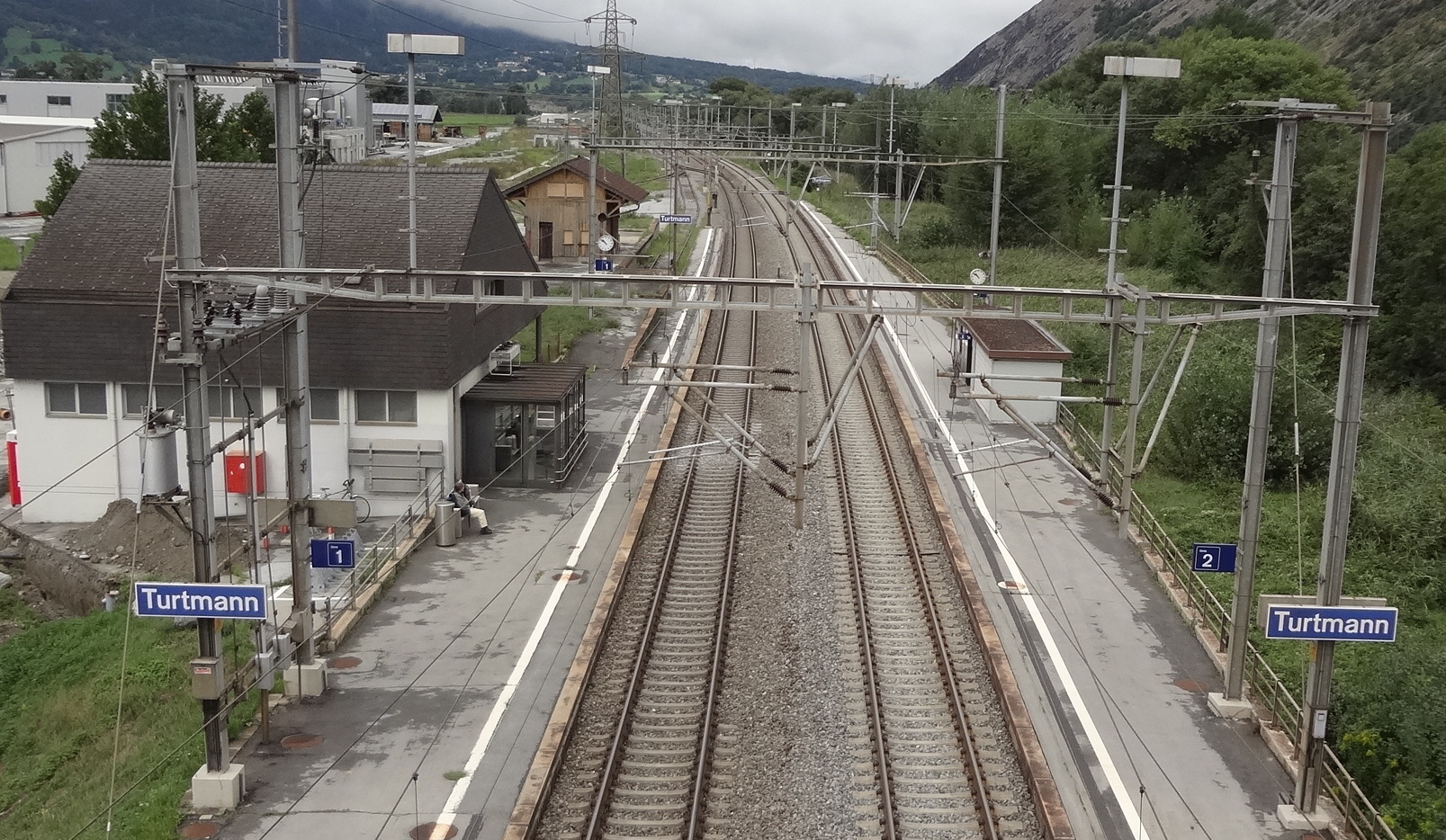
Turtmann train station

As of 2012, there were a total of 530 people employed in the municipality. Of these, a total of 94 people worked in 36 businesses in the primary economic sector. The secondary sector employed 204 workers in 22 separate businesses. Finally, the tertiary sector provided 232 jobs in 61 businesses. In 2013 a total of 4.5% of the population received social assistance.

== Crime ==
In 2014 the crime rate, of the over 200 crimes listed in the Swiss Criminal Code (running from murder, robbery and assault to accepting bribes and election fraud), in Turtmann-Unterems was 13.3 per thousand residents. This rate is lower than average, at only 31.4% of the cantonal rate and 20.6% of the average rate in the entire country. During the same period, the rate of drug crimes was 7.1 per thousand residents, which is only 71.7% of the national rate. The rate of violations of immigration, visa and work permit laws was 0 per thousand residents.
