= Gruben/Meiden =

Swiss village

Coordinates: 46°12′39″N 7°42′19″E

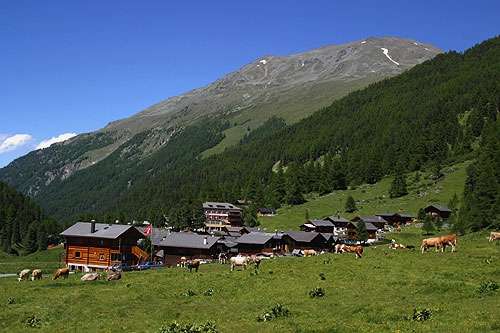
Looking north

Gruben/Meiden (1,818 m) is a village in the Swiss Alps, located in the canton of Valais. It is situated in the upper Turtmanntal and is traversed by the Turtmanna river. It belongs to the municipality of Oberems and is the main settlement in the valley south of the town of Oberems. The village is inhabited in summer only.
