= Valais Monster =

Ferocious beast(s) of Valais, Switzerland

Monster of Valais
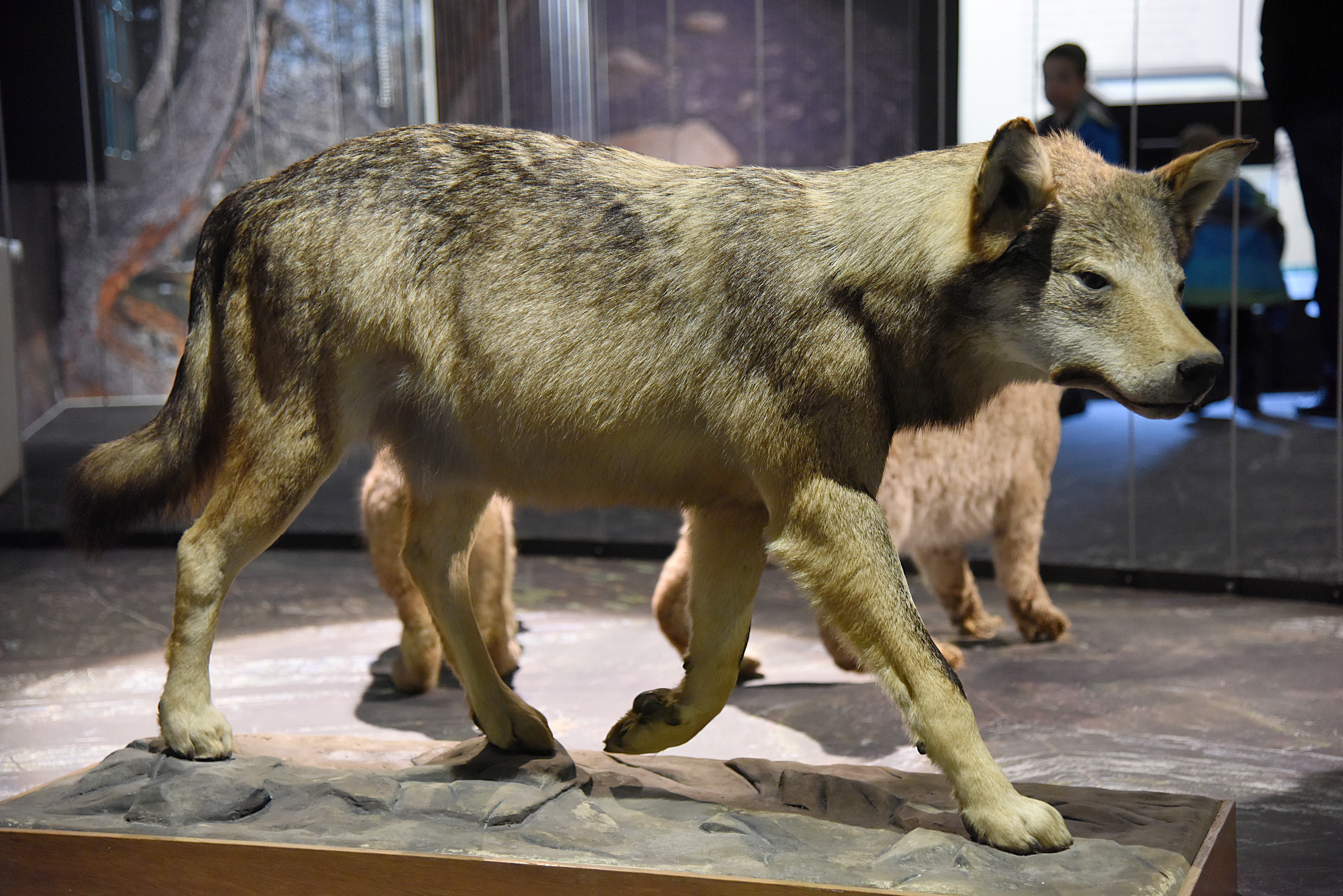
- The "Eischoll Wolf", killed in 1947 and exhibited in the public rooms of the Valais Nature Museum in Sion.

Creature information
- Other name: Mysterious animal of Leuk

Origin
- Country: Switzerland
- Region: Europe

Valais Monster (French: Monstre du Valais), also known as Eischoll Wolf, and Mysterious animal of Leuk (French: Animal mystérieux de la Loèche), is the nickname of one or more ferocious beasts that attacked numerous herds in the canton of Valais, Switzerland, from April 1946. Starting from the report of the herds devoured on the mountain pastures, the rumor swells. The Swiss press used the name "monster". Among a multitude of supposed identities, those of a lynx or one or several panthers dominate, supported by testimonies followed by many in the media. However, the Valais Monster seems to have been a large European wolf, shot in Eischoll on 27 November 1947.

The case of the Valais Monster is studied in the context of contemporary rumors, offering insight into the human relationship with wildlife, especially large carnivores. It testifies to the tendency of the population to imagine the presence of dangerous felines, based on fear and erroneous testimonies. The animal shot in 1947 attests the punctual presence of wolves in the Alps, at a time when the species is supposed to have deserted the region.

== Name and sources ==
The Swiss press has nicknamed this animal the "monster of the Valais", it is also known under the name of "mysterious animal of Leuk". The case was mainly commented by the abbot and naturalist Ignace Mariétan, in his Bulletin de la Murithienne. The police reports, the local press, in particular the Nouvelliste valaisan, and the Journal et feuille d'avis du Valais, allow to complete the description of the affair. According to Anne Bachmann, reconstructing the history of the Valais monster is difficult, because the sources of the time do not all agree. Ignace Mariétan notes some attacks that the press does not mention, and vice versa. The dates and the number of victims are different.

== Context ==
The case of the "Valais Monster" belongs to the contemporary rumors of the ferocious beast. While these cases used to involve anthropophagous animals, usually dogs and wolves, in the 20th century, the "beasts" are increasingly seen as felines, and are generally content to kill domestic animals. The magnitude of the Valais monster case can be explained in part by the past elimination of large carnivorous predators in Switzerland. The wolf disappeared from the Valais at the end of the 19th century, the bear and the lynx at the beginning of the 20th century. Pastoral activities were unhindered. The locals lost their knowledge of the large predators, which explains the numerous difficulties encountered in identifying and hunting them.

According to Alexandre Scheurer, the inhabitants of Valais have a "perception of fauna dominated by fear and fantasy". They have always been afraid of the wolf, despite the fact that the annals of the region record only one human victim due to a wolf, a child in 1637. This situation is very different from that of France, where the same records attribute many victims to wolves. Two lynx attacks are officially recorded in the region (in 1770 and 1866), but the feline is not known to attack humans. Most of the injuries sustained from animal attacks are the result of hunting situations.

== Legacy and cultural impact ==
Henri Calet was in Valais at the time of the "monster". He speaks at length about this affair in his travel diary L'Italie à la paresseuse. Albert Muret's novel Fausta tells the story of the Valais Monster. In his Journal intime d'un pays, Maurice Chappaz speaks of "wounded sheep [that] were collected in the small meadows above the chalets. Others were picked up with their throats slit in the scree slopes". A Swiss artist's oil painting measuring 44 by 31 cm is listed under the title "Monstre du Valais". In 1966, S. Corinna Bille published a book entitled Le Mystère du Monstre (The Mystery of the Monster), which referred to the whole affair. First published by the Verdonnet editions, it was republished by Cahiers de la Renaissance vaudoise with illustrations by Robert Hainard in 1968. A later republication was made by Joie de lire in 1993 and 1994, still with illustrations by Hainard, and again in 2012 by Joie de lire, with new illustrations by Fanny Dreyer.

The Valais Monster has entered the popular culture of the Valais: the name "Valais Monster" was used, for example, to qualify a socialist interventionist bill in the region.

== Bibliographic sources ==
- [Bachmann 2009] Anne Bachmann, Histoire du loup en Valais au 20e siècle : un reflet de notre rapport à l'environnement et de son évolution (Mémoire de licence), Lausanne, Université de Lausanne, 2009.
- [Barloy 1990] Jean-Jacques Barloy, « Rumeurs sur des animaux mystérieux », Communications. Rumeurs et légendes contemporaines, no 52, 1990, p. 197-218
- [Campion-Vincent 1992] Véronique Campion-Vincent, Des fauves dans nos campagnes : légendes, rumeurs et apparitions, Imago, 1992, 156 p. ISBN 978-2-902702-73-2
- [Hediger 1951] (de) Heini Hediger, « Wolf und fuchs », dans Jagdzoologie – auch für Nichtjäger, Verlag Friedrich Reinhardt, 1951, 212 p.
- [Meichtry 2010] (de) Wilfried Meichtry, Hexenplatz und Mörderstein : die Geschichten aus dem magischen Pfynwald, Verlag Nagel & Kimche AG, 26 juillet 2010, 160 p. ISBN 978-3-312-00462-1
- [Meurger 1990] Michel Meurger, « Les félins exotiques dans le légendaire français », Communications. Rumeurs et légendes contemporaines, no 52, 1990, p. 180-183 doi:10.3406/comm.1990.1790
- [Prêtre 1999] Bernard Prêtre, Le Grand retour du loup, Yens-sur-Morges (Suisse), Cabédita, 1999, 224 p. ISBN 2-88295-248-1
- [Scheurer 2010] (fr + de) Alexandre Scheurer, « Craintes, fantasmes et croyances suscitées par la faune alpine : l’exemple du Valais romand (Suisse), XVIe–XXe siècle », Histoire des Alpes – Storia delle Alpi – Geschichte der Alpen, Association internationale pour l’histoire des Alpes – Chronos-Verlag, vol. 15 « L'homme et l'animal sauvage – Mensch und Wildtiere », 2010 ISBN 978-3-0340-1050-4, doi:10.5169/seals-392017.
