= Wiwannihorn =

Mountain in Switzerland

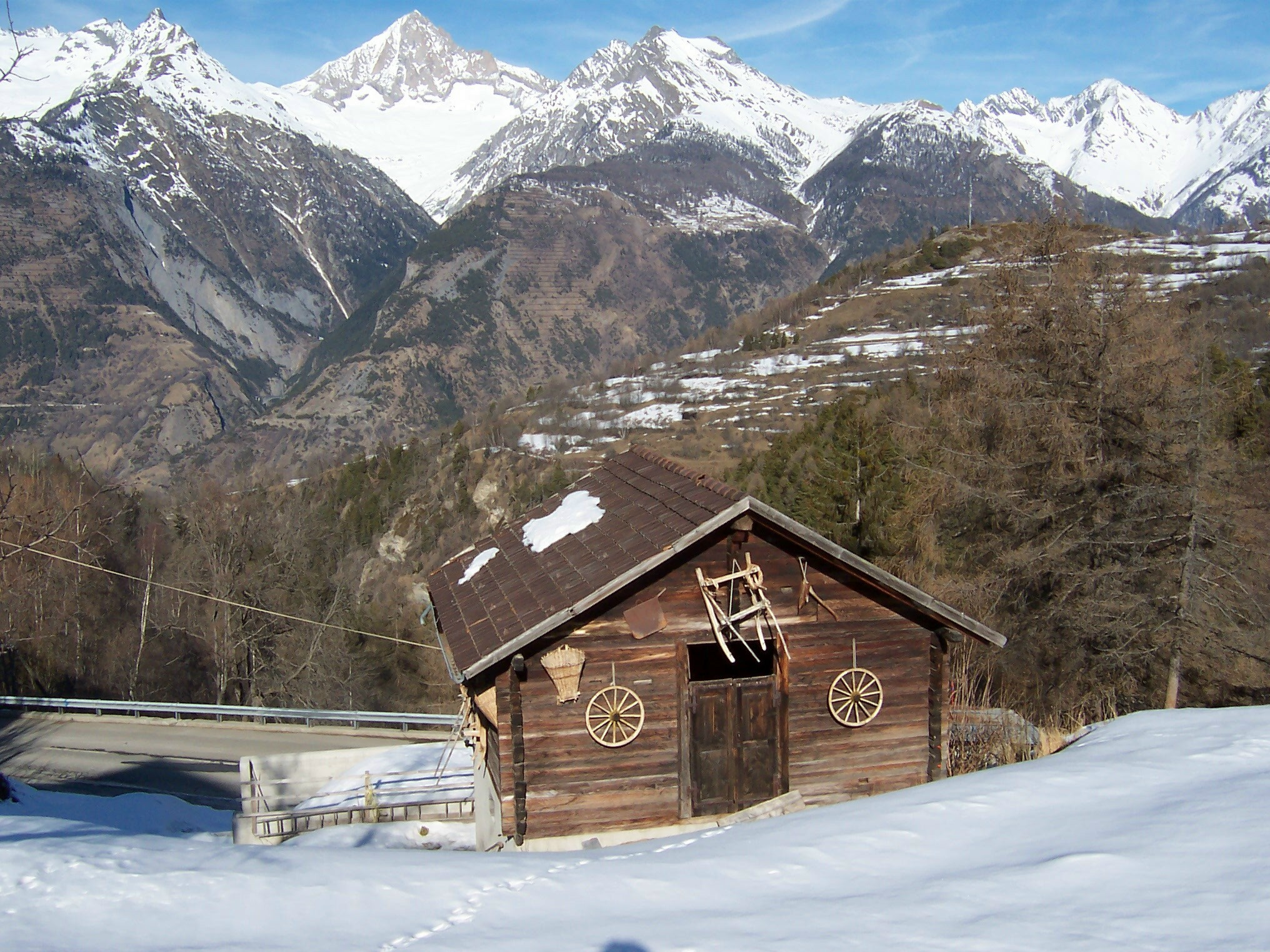
- The Wiwannihorn (central mountain) from Unterbäch

Highest point
- Elevation: 3,000 m (9,800 ft)
- Prominence: 149 m (489 ft)
- Parent peak: Finsteraarhorn
- Coordinates: 46°21′17.7″N 7°51′22.3″E

Geography
- Location within Switzerland
- Location: Valais, Switzerland
- Parent range: Bernese Alps

The Wiwannihorn is a mountain of the Bernese Alps, located north of Ausserberg in the canton of Valais. It lies on the range between the Bietschtal and the Baltschiedertal, south of the Bietschhorn.

The Wiwannihorn can be climbed easily on its normal route with proper equipment. Several more technical, multi-pitch free climbing and alpine climbing routes lead to the top as well. The most famous is probably the Steinadlerroute. The basecamp for climbing the Wiwannihorn is the Wiwanni hut that is accessible from Ausserberg via a hiking trail or a via ferrata through the Baltschieder valley.
