= Inden, Switzerland =

Inden
- Municipality
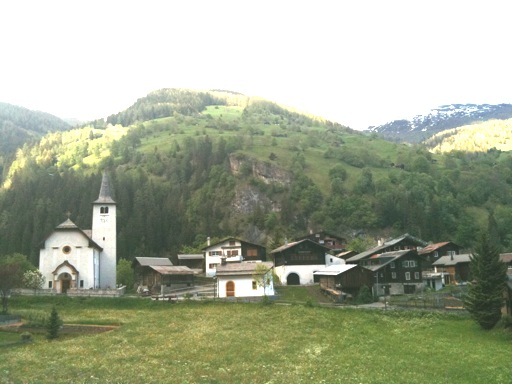
- Inden village

- Flag Coat of arms
- Location of Inden
- Location within Switzerland Location within Canton of Valais
- Coordinates: 46°20′N 7°37′E
- Country: Switzerland
- Canton: Valais
- District: Leuk

Government
  - Mayor: Marianne Müller

Area
  - Total: 9.9 km^{2} (3.8 sq mi)
- Elevation: 1,138 m (3,734 ft)

Population (December 2002)
  - Total: 103
  - Density: 10/km^{2} (27/sq mi)
- Time zone: UTC+01:00 (CET)
  - Summer (DST): UTC+02:00 (CEST)
- Postal code: 3953
- SFOS number: 6109
- ISO 3166 code: CH-VS
- Surrounded by: Albinen, Leuk, Leukerbad, Mollens, Varen
- Website: www.inden.ch

Inden (German pronunciation: [ˈɪndn̩]) is a municipality in the district of Leuk in the canton of Valais in Switzerland.

== History ==
Inden is first mentioned in 1242 as Indes.

== Geography ==
Inden has an area, as of 2009, of 9.9 square kilometers (3.8 mi^{2}). Of this area, 0.84 km^{2} (0.32 mi^{2}) or 8.5% is used for agricultural purposes, while 2.92 km^{2} (1.13 mi^{2}) or 29.6% is forested. Of the rest of the land, 0.27 km^{2} (0.10 mi^{2}) or 2.7% is settled (buildings or roads), 0.04 km^{2} (9.9 acres) or 0.4% is either rivers or lakes and 5.82 km^{2} (2.25 mi^{2}) or 59.0% is unproductive land.

Of the built up area, housing and buildings made up 0.6% and transportation infrastructure made up 1.9%. Out of the forested land, 26.5% of the total land area is heavily forested and 2.2% is covered with orchards or small clusters of trees. Of the agricultural land, 0.0% is used for growing crops and 3.1% is pastures and 5.4% is used for alpine pastures. All the water in the municipality is flowing water. Of the unproductive areas, 10.1% is unproductive vegetation and 48.9% is too rocky for vegetation.

The municipality is located in the Leuk district, on a high plateau and along the road that runs from Leukerbad to the Gemmi Pass.

== Coat of arms ==
The blazon of the municipal coat of arms is Or, a two-arched masoned Wall Gules, in chief an Eagle displayed Sable between two Mullets of Six of the second.

== Demographics ==
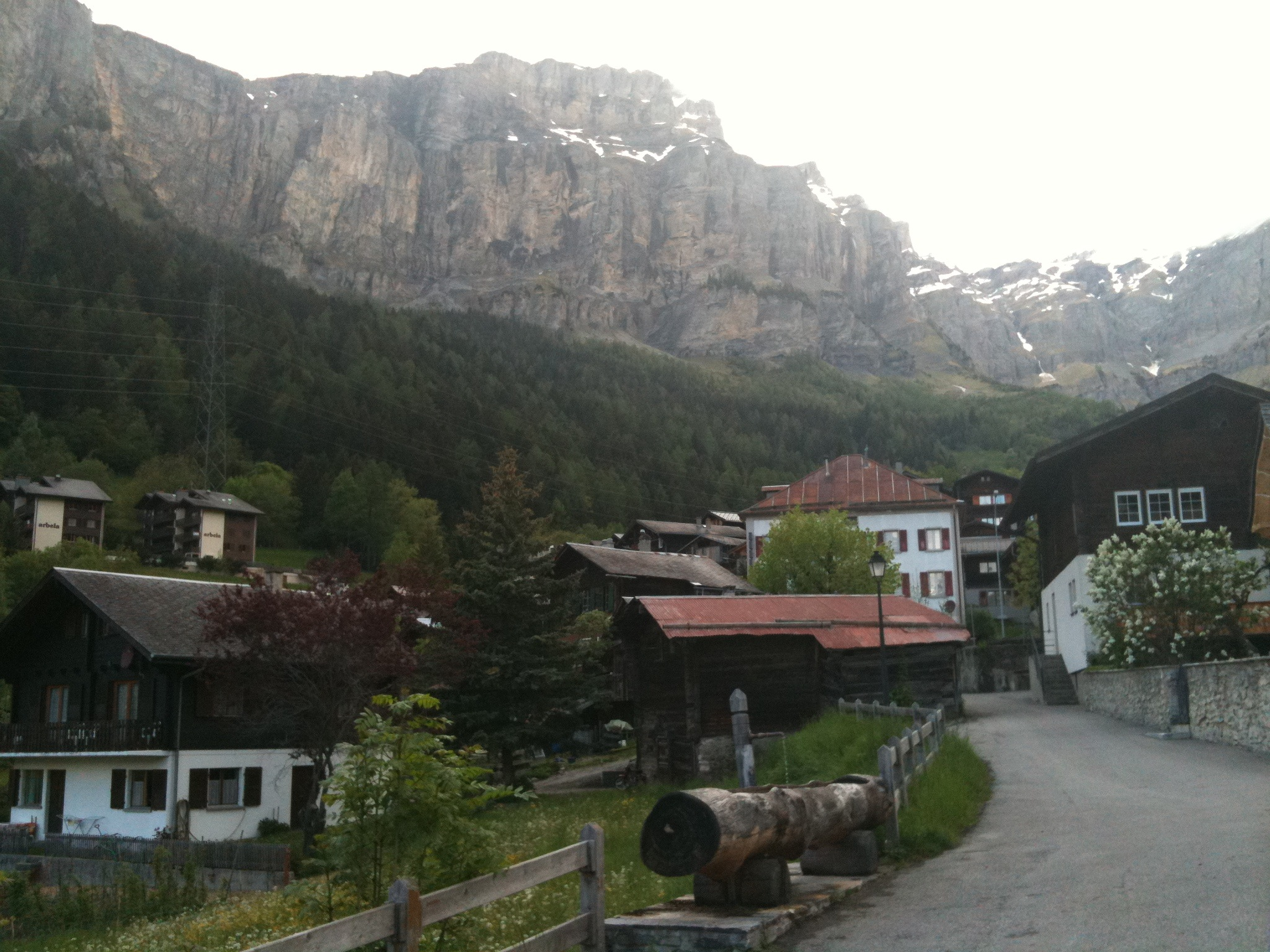
Inden village

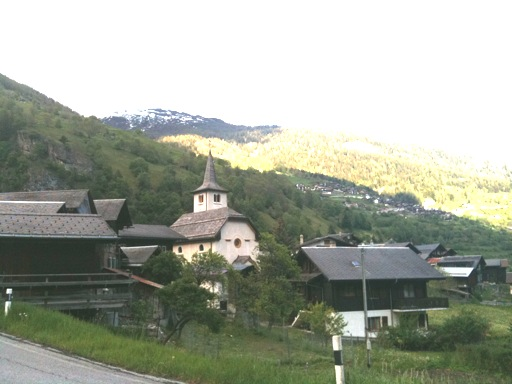
Inden church and surrounding village

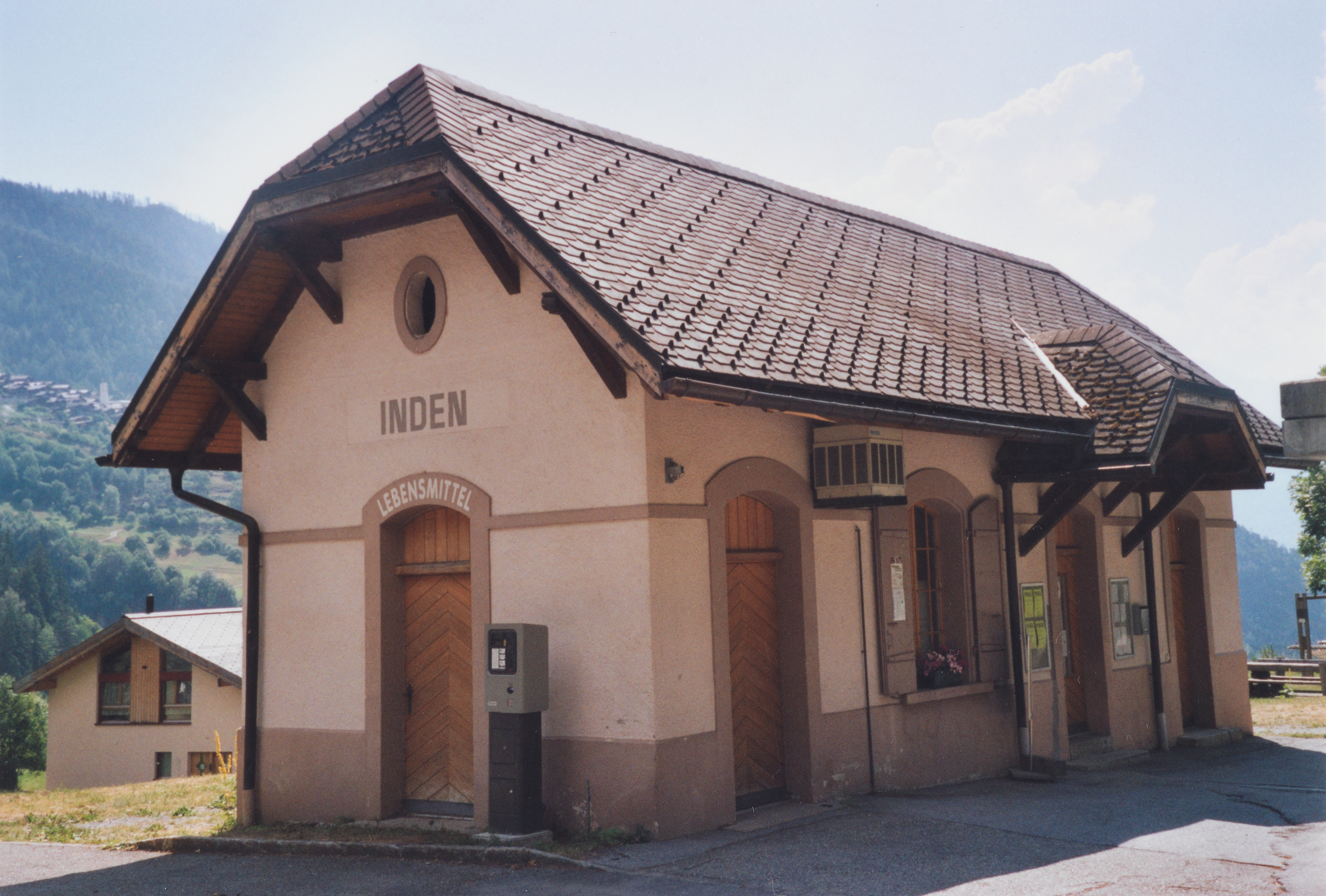
Store, former station of Leuk–Leukerbad-Bahn (2006)

Inden has a population (as of December 2020) of 115. As of 2008, 9.7% of the population are resident foreign nationals. Over the last 10 years (1999–2009 ) the population has changed at a rate of 5.5%. It has changed at a rate of 21.8% due to migration and at a rate of -5.5% due to births and deaths.

Most of the population (as of 2000) speaks German (82 or 92.1%) as their first language, French is the second most common (3 or 3.4%) and Italian is the third (2 or 2.2%).

As of 2008, the gender distribution of the population was 50.0% male and 50.0% female. The population was made up of 46 Swiss men (39.7% of the population) and 12 (10.3%) non-Swiss men. There were 50 Swiss women (43.1%) and 8 (6.9%) non-Swiss women. Of the population in the municipality 18 or about 20.2% were born in Inden and lived there in 2000. There were 37 or 41.6% who were born in the same canton, while 18 or 20.2% were born somewhere else in Switzerland, and 15 or 16.9% were born outside of Switzerland.

The age distribution of the population (as of 2000) is children and teenagers (0–19 years old) make up 18% of the population, while adults (20–64 years old) make up 57.3% and seniors (over 64 years old) make up 24.7%.

As of 2000, there were 32 people who were single and never married in the municipality. There were 40 married individuals, 12 widows or widowers and 5 individuals who are divorced.

As of 2000, there were 43 private households in the municipality, and an average of 1.9 persons per household. There were 19 households that consist of only one person and households with five or more people. Out of a total of 45 households that answered this question, 42.2% were households made up of just one person. Of the rest of the households, there are 10 married couples without children, 9 married couples with children There were 2 single parents with a child or children. There were 3 households that were made up of unrelated people and 2 households that were made up of some sort of institution or another collective housing.

In 2000 there were 55 single family homes (or 67.1% of the total) out of a total of 82 inhabited buildings. There were 17 multi-family buildings (20.7%), along with 6 multi-purpose buildings that were mostly used for housing (7.3%) and 4 other use buildings (commercial or industrial) that also had some housing (4.9%).

In 2000, a total of 42 apartments (31.3% of the total) were permanently occupied, while 81 apartments (60.4%) were seasonally occupied and 11 apartments (8.2%) were empty. As of 2009, the construction rate of new housing units was 8.6 new units per 1000 residents. The vacancy rate for the municipality, in 2010, was 4.38%.

The historical population is given in the following chart:

== Politics ==
In the 2007 federal election the most popular party was the CVP which received 55.92% of the vote. The next three most popular parties were the SP (18.34%), the SVP (13.91%) and the Green Party (6.21%). In the federal election, a total of 50 votes were cast, and the voter turnout was 58.8%.

In the 2009 Conseil d'État/Staatsrat election a total of 50 votes were cast, of which 6 or about 12.0% were invalid. The voter participation was 66.7%, which is much more than the cantonal average of 54.67%. In the 2007 Swiss Council of States election a total of 49 votes were cast, of which 4 or about 8.2% were invalid. The voter participation was 59.0%, which is similar to the cantonal average of 59.88%.

== Economy ==
As of 2010, Inden had an unemployment rate of 2.7%. As of 2008, there were 20 people employed in the primary economic sector and about 3 businesses involved in this sector. 6 people were employed in the secondary sector and there was 1 business in this sector. 8 people were employed in the tertiary sector, with 2 businesses in this sector. There were 42 residents of the municipality who were employed in some capacity, of which females made up 50.0% of the workforce.

In 2008 the total number of full-time equivalent jobs was 27. The number of jobs in the primary sector was 13, all of which were in agriculture. The number of jobs in the secondary sector was 6, all of which were in construction. The number of jobs in the tertiary sector was 8, all of which were in a hotel or restaurant.

In 2000, there were 6 workers who commuted into the municipality and 30 workers who commuted away. The municipality is a net exporter of workers, with about 5.0 workers leaving the municipality for every one entering. Of the working population, 16.7% used public transportation to get to work, and 54.8% used a private car.

== Religion ==
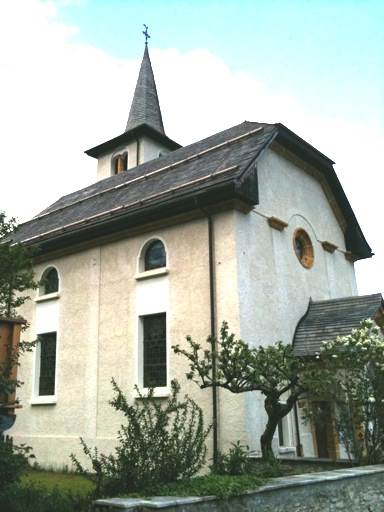
Parish church of Inden

From the 2000 census, 71 or 79.8% were Roman Catholic, while 7 or 7.9% belonged to the Swiss Reformed Church. Of the rest of the population, there were 2 individuals (or about 2.25% of the population) who belonged to the Christian Catholic Church. There was 1 person who was Buddhist. 8 (or about 8.99% of the population) belonged to no church, are agnostic or atheist.

== Education ==
In Inden about 40 or (44.9%) of the population have completed non-mandatory upper secondary education, and 11 or (12.4%) have completed additional higher education (either university or a Fachhochschule). Of the 11 who completed tertiary schooling, 36.4% were Swiss men, 27.3% were Swiss women.

As of 2000, there was one student in Inden who came from another municipality, while 9 residents attended schools outside the municipality.
