= Varen, Switzerland =

Varen
- Municipality
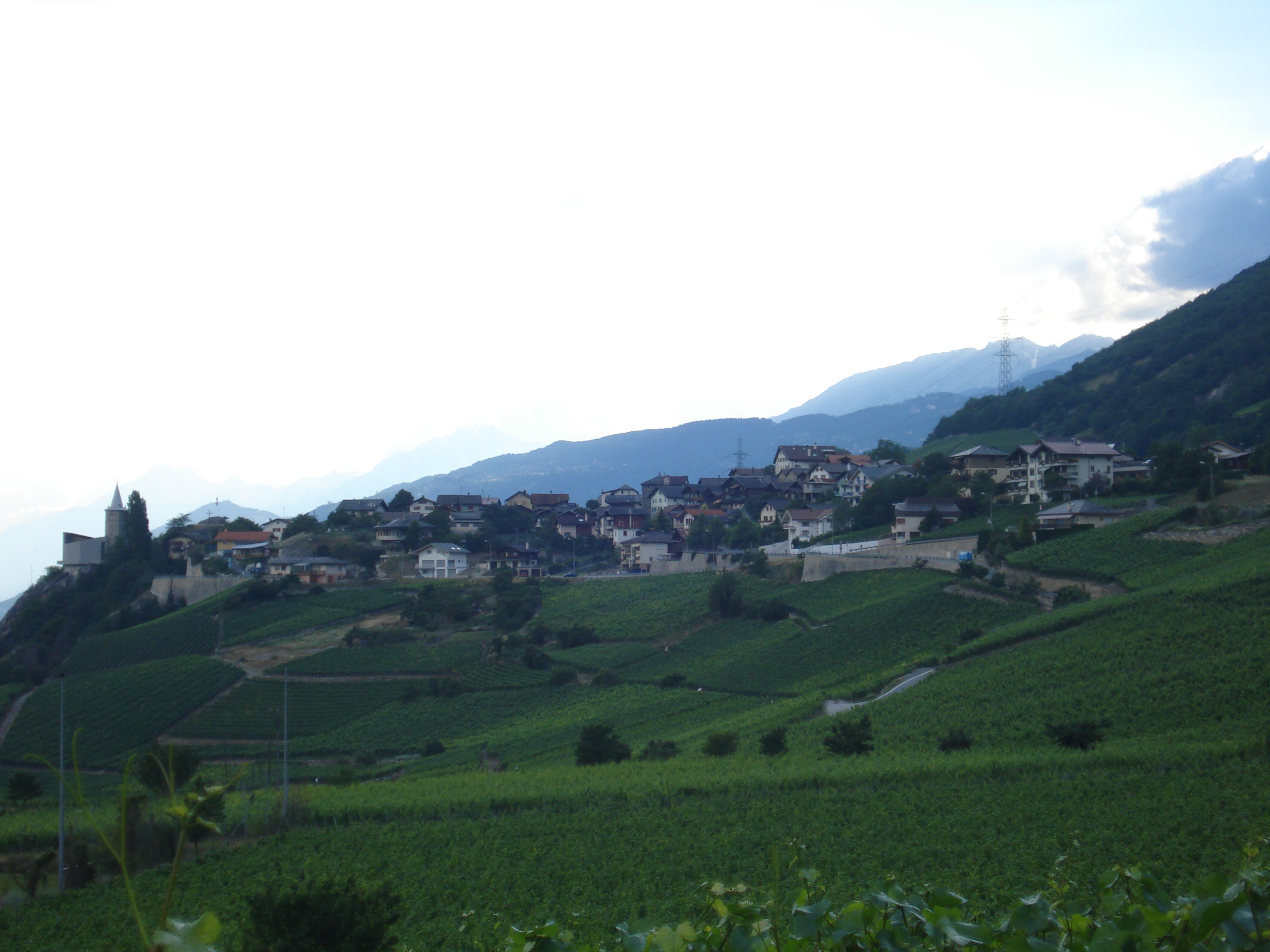
- Varen village

- Flag Coat of arms
- Location of Varen
- Location within Switzerland Location within Canton of Valais
- Coordinates: 46°19′N 7°36′E
- Country: Switzerland
- Canton: Valais
- District: Leuk

Government
  - Mayor: Gilbert Loretan

Area
  - Total: 12.8 km^{2} (4.9 sq mi)
- Elevation: 716 m (2,349 ft)

Population (December 2002)
  - Total: 857
  - Density: 67.0/km^{2} (173/sq mi)
- Time zone: UTC+01:00 (CET)
  - Summer (DST): UTC+02:00 (CEST)
- Postal code: 3953
- SFOS number: 6116
- ISO 3166 code: CH-VS
- Surrounded by: Inden, Leuk, Mollens, Salgesch
- Website: www.varen.ch

Varen (French: Varone) is a municipality in the district of Leuk in the canton of Valais in Switzerland.

== History ==
Varen is first mentioned in 1225 as Varonam.

Varen was used as a setting for the British/American crime drama "The Missing".

== Geography ==
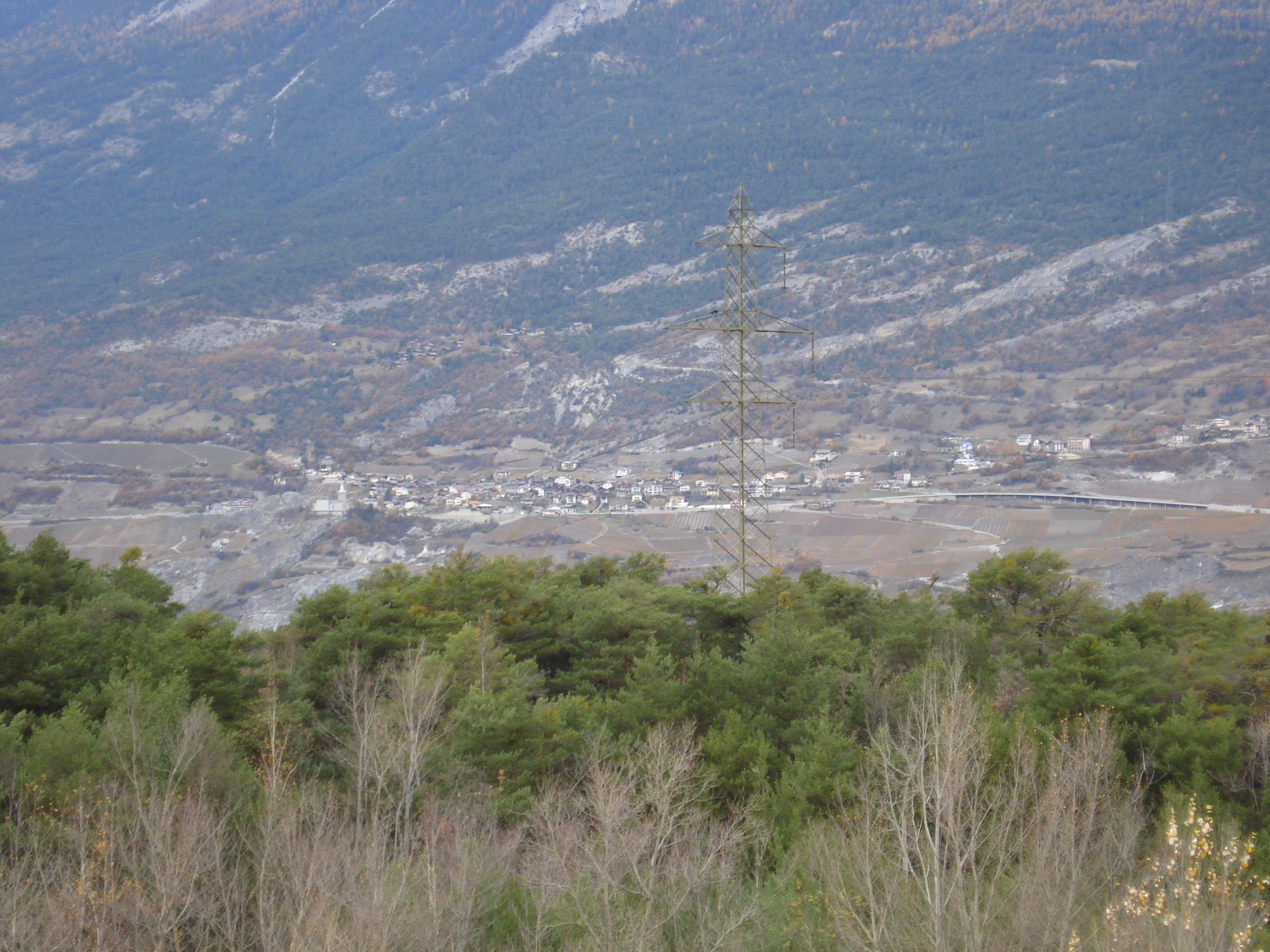
Varen

Aerial view (1955)

Varen has an area, as of 2009, of 12.8 square kilometers (4.9 mi^{2}). Of this area, 4.06 km^{2} (1.57 mi^{2}) or 31.7% is used for agricultural purposes, while 4.35 km^{2} (1.68 mi^{2}) or 34.0% is forested. Of the rest of the land, 0.51 km^{2} (0.20 mi^{2}) or 4.0% is settled (buildings or roads), 0.17 km^{2} (0.066 mi^{2}) or 1.3% is either rivers or lakes and 3.67 km^{2} (1.42 mi^{2}) or 28.6% is unproductive land.

Of the built up area, housing and buildings made up 1.4% and transportation infrastructure made up 2.0%. Out of the forested land, 30.2% of the total land area is heavily forested and 3.7% is covered with orchards or small clusters of trees. Of the agricultural land, 0.1% is used for growing crops and 1.6% is pastures, while 9.3% is used for orchards or vine crops and 20.7% is used for alpine pastures. All the water in the municipality is flowing water. Of the unproductive areas, 9.8% is unproductive vegetation and 18.9% is too rocky for vegetation.

The municipality is located in the Leuk district, on the right slope of the Rhone above the Pfynwald (Pfyn woods).

== Coat of arms ==
The blazon of the municipal coat of arms is Or, a Tree Vert eradicated and trunked proper in base Coupeaux Vert on a Chief Azure three Mullets of Five Argent.

== Demographics ==
Varen has a population (as of December 2020) of 682. As of 2008, 5.8% of the population are resident foreign nationals. Over the last 10 years (1999–2009 ) the population has changed at a rate of -7.3%. It has changed at a rate of 0.9% due to migration and at a rate of -2.7% due to births and deaths.

Most of the population (as of 2000) speaks German (566 or 94.0%) as their first language, Serbo-Croatian is the second most common (20 or 3.3%) and French is the third (8 or 1.3%). There are 3 people who speak Italian.

As of 2008, the gender distribution of the population was 48.9% male and 51.1% female. The population was made up of 287 Swiss men (47.0% of the population) and 11 (1.8%) non-Swiss men. There were 289 Swiss women (47.4%) and 23 (3.8%) non-Swiss women. Of the population in the municipality 379 or about 63.0% were born in Varen and lived there in 2000. There were 133 or 22.1% who were born in the same canton, while 41 or 6.8% were born somewhere else in Switzerland, and 41 or 6.8% were born outside of Switzerland.

The age distribution of the population (as of 2000) is children and teenagers (0–19 years old) make up 19.9% of the population, while adults (20–64 years old) make up 64% and seniors (over 64 years old) make up 16.1%.

As of 2000, there were 221 people who were single and never married in the municipality. There were 322 married individuals, 46 widows or widowers and 13 individuals who are divorced.

As of 2000, there were 254 private households in the municipality, and an average of 2.3 persons per household. There were 71 households that consist of only one person and 11 households with five or more people. Out of a total of 256 households that answered this question, 27.7% were households made up of just one person and there were 6 adults who lived with their parents. Of the rest of the households, there are 78 married couples without children, 79 married couples with children There were 15 single parents with a child or children. There were 5 households that were made up of unrelated people and 2 households that were made up of some sort of institution or another collective housing.

In 2000 there were 123 single family homes (or 58.9% of the total) out of a total of 209 inhabited buildings. There were 61 multi-family buildings (29.2%), along with 15 multi-purpose buildings that were mostly used for housing (7.2%) and 10 other use buildings (commercial or industrial) that also had some housing (4.8%).

In 2000, a total of 242 apartments (75.4% of the total) were permanently occupied, while 58 apartments (18.1%) were seasonally occupied and 21 apartments (6.5%) were empty. As of 2009, the construction rate of new housing units was 3.3 new units per 1000 residents. The vacancy rate for the municipality, in 2010, was 2.65%.

The historical population is given in the following chart:

== Politics ==
In the 2007 federal election the most popular party was the CVP which received 74.6% of the vote. The next three most popular parties were the SVP (11.3%), the SP (9.49%) and the FDP (2.8%). In the federal election, a total of 364 votes were cast, and the voter turnout was 71.1%.

In the 2009 Conseil d'État/Staatsrat election a total of 390 votes were cast, of which 17 or about 4.4% were invalid. The voter participation was 79.0%, which is much more than the cantonal average of 54.67%. In the 2007 Swiss Council of States election a total of 359 votes were cast, of which 14 or about 3.9% were invalid. The voter participation was 71.5%, which is much more than the cantonal average of 59.88%.

== Economy ==
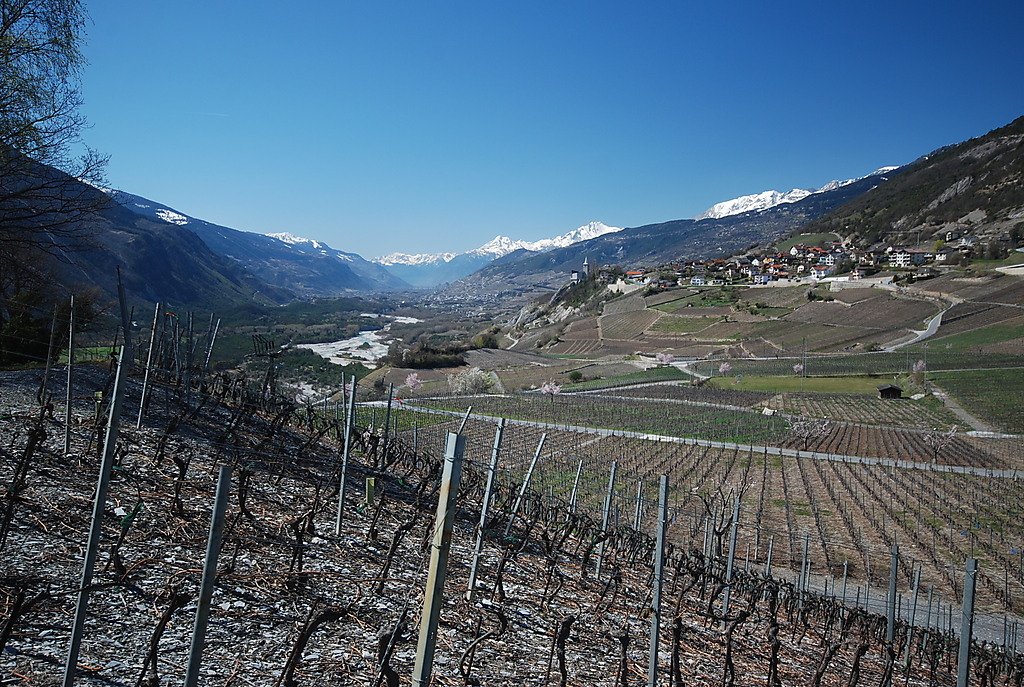
Vineyards in Varen. Over half of all jobs in Varen are in agriculture

As of 2010, Varen had an unemployment rate of 0.9%. As of 2008, there were 120 people employed in the primary economic sector and about 58 businesses involved in this sector. 16 people were employed in the secondary sector and there were 7 businesses in this sector. 57 people were employed in the tertiary sector, with 17 businesses in this sector. There were 304 residents of the municipality who were employed in some capacity, of which females made up 39.5% of the workforce.

In 2008 the total number of full-time equivalent jobs was 116. The number of jobs in the primary sector was 60, all of which were in agriculture. The number of jobs in the secondary sector was 13 of which 6 or (46.2%) were in manufacturing and 5 (38.5%) were in construction. The number of jobs in the tertiary sector was 43. In the tertiary sector; 15 or 34.9% were in wholesale or retail sales or the repair of motor vehicles, 6 or 14.0% were in the movement and storage of goods, 6 or 14.0% were in a hotel or restaurant, 1 was the insurance or financial industry, 8 or 18.6% were technical professionals or scientists, 3 or 7.0% were in education and 1 was in health care.

In 2000, there were 20 workers who commuted into the municipality and 201 workers who commuted away. The municipality is a net exporter of workers, with about 10.1 workers leaving the municipality for every one entering. Of the working population, 19.1% used public transportation to get to work, and 55.9% used a private car.

== Religion ==
From the 2000 census, 544 or 90.4% were Roman Catholic, while 23 or 3.8% belonged to the Swiss Reformed Church. Of the rest of the population, there were 22 members of an Orthodox church (or about 3.65% of the population). There were 2 (or about 0.33% of the population) who were Islamic. 7 (or about 1.16% of the population) belonged to no church, are agnostic or atheist, and 4 individuals (or about 0.66% of the population) did not answer the question.

== Education ==
In Varen about 191 or (31.7%) of the population have completed non-mandatory upper secondary education, and 28 or (4.7%) have completed additional higher education (either university or a Fachhochschule). Of the 28 who completed tertiary schooling, 71.4% were Swiss men, 14.3% were Swiss women.

During the 2010-2011 school year there were a total of 43 students in the Varen school system. The education system in the Canton of Valais allows young children to attend one year of non-obligatory Kindergarten. During that school year, there was one kindergarten class (KG1 or KG2) and 12 kindergarten students. The canton's school system requires students to attend six years of primary school. In Varen there were a total of 3 classes and 43 students in the primary school. The secondary school program consists of three lower, obligatory years of schooling (orientation classes), followed by three to five years of optional, advanced schools. All the lower and upper secondary students from Varen attend their school in a neighboring municipality.

As of 2000, there was one student in Varen who came from another municipality, while 30 residents attended schools outside the municipality.
