= Unterems =

- Former municipality
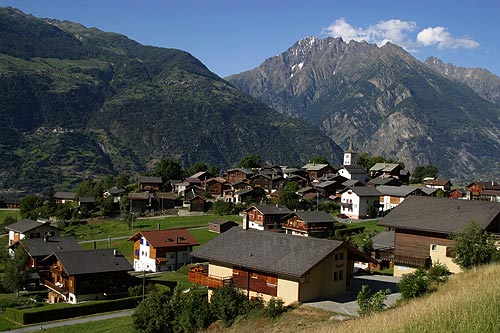

- Flag Coat of arms
- Location of Unterems
- Location within Switzerland Location within Canton of Valais
- Coordinates: 46°17′N 7°42′E
- Country: Switzerland
- Canton: Valais
- District: Leuk

Government
  - Mayor: Johann Tscherrig

Area
  - Total: 1.4 km^{2} (0.54 sq mi)
- Elevation: 1,003 m (3,291 ft)
- Highest elevation (Massoltern): 1,200 m (3,900 ft)
- Lowest elevation: 800 m (2,600 ft)

Population (December 2011)
  - Total: 142
  - Density: 100/km^{2} (260/sq mi)
- Time zone: UTC+01:00 (CET)
  - Summer (DST): UTC+02:00 (CEST)
- Postal code: 3948
- SFOS number: 6115
- ISO 3166 code: CH-VS
- Surrounded by: Agarn, Ergisch, Oberems, Turtmann
- Website: www.unterems.ch

Unterems was a municipality in the district of Leuk in the canton of Valais in Switzerland. The municipalities of Turtmann and Unterems merged on 1 January 2013 into the new municipality of Turtmann-Unterems.

== History ==
Unterems is first mentioned in 1270 as inferiorem hemesa.

== Geography ==
Unterems had an area, as of 2011, of 1.4 square kilometers (0.54 mi^{2}). Of this area, 39.1% is used for agricultural purposes, while 53.6% is forested. Of the rest of the land, 7.2% is settled (buildings or roads) and 0.0% is unproductive land.

The former municipality is located in the Leuk district, high on the left side of the Rhone valley. It consists of the village of Unterems and the hamlets of Ze Schmidu, Feldishaus and Prupräsu.

== Coat of arms ==
The blazon of the municipal coat of arms is Azure a Cross Patee Gules in chief two Mullets of Six Or in base a branch of Lime Tree/Linden Tree slipped with three Leaves Vert.

== Demographics ==
Unterems had a population (as of 2011) of 142. As of 2008, 2.5% of the population are resident foreign nationals. Over the last 10 years (1999–2009 ) the population has changed at a rate of 5.9%. It has changed at a rate of 7.8% due to migration and at a rate of -15.7% due to births and deaths.

Most of the population (as of 2000) speaks German (158 or 98.1%) as their first language, French, Italian and Spanish are all spoken by 1 person.

As of 2008, the gender distribution of the population was 43.2% male and 56.8% female. The population was made up of 70 Swiss men (43.2% of the population) and (0.0%) non-Swiss men. There were 88 Swiss women (54.3%) and 4 (2.5%) non-Swiss women. Of the population in the municipality 89 or about 55.3% were born in Unterems and lived there in 2000. There were 46 or 28.6% who were born in the same canton, while 13 or 8.1% were born somewhere else in Switzerland, and 3 or 1.9% were born outside of Switzerland.

The age distribution of the population (as of 2000) is children and teenagers (0–19 years old) make up 19.3% of the population, while adults (20–64 years old) make up 55.3% and seniors (over 64 years old) make up 25.5%.

As of 2000, there were 59 people who were single and never married in the municipality. There were 78 married individuals, 22 widows or widowers and 2 individuals who are divorced.

As of 2000, there were 56 private households in the municipality, and an average of 2.5 persons per household. There were 17 households that consist of only one person and 4 households with five or more people. Out of a total of 59 households that answered this question, 28.8% were households made up of just one person and there were 2 adults who lived with their parents. Of the rest of the households, there are 13 married couples without children, 23 married couples with children There was 1 household that was made up of unrelated people and 3 households that were made up of some sort of institution or another collective housing.

In 2000 there were 71 single family homes (or 72.4% of the total) out of a total of 98 inhabited buildings. There were 17 multi-family buildings (17.3%), along with 8 multi-purpose buildings that were mostly used for housing (8.2%) and 2 other use buildings (commercial or industrial) that also had some housing (2.0%).

In 2000, a total of 51 apartments (41.1% of the total) were permanently occupied, while 66 apartments (53.2%) were seasonally occupied and 7 apartments (5.6%) were empty.

The historical population is given in the following chart:

== Politics ==
In the 2007 federal election the most popular party was the CVP which received 48.11% of the vote. The next three most popular parties were the SVP (33.77%), the SP (14.72%) and the Green Party (2.08%). In the federal election, a total of 82 votes were cast, and the voter turnout was 66.1%.

In the 2009 Conseil d'État/Staatsrat election a total of 66 votes were cast, of which or about 0.0% were invalid. The voter participation was 54.6%, which is similar to the cantonal average of 54.67%. In the 2007 Swiss Council of States election a total of 81 votes were cast, of which 1 or about 1.2% were invalid. The voter participation was 65.3%, which is much more than the cantonal average of 59.88%.

== Economy ==
As of 2010, Unterems had an unemployment rate of 0.7%. As of 2008, there were 19 people employed in the primary economic sector and about 8 businesses involved in this sector. No one was employed in the secondary sector. 79 people were employed in the tertiary sector, with 5 businesses in this sector. There were 64 residents of the municipality who were employed in some capacity, of which females made up 45.3% of the workforce.

In 2008 the total number of full-time equivalent jobs was 53. The number of jobs in the primary sector was 9, all of which were in agriculture. There were no jobs in the secondary sector. The number of jobs in the tertiary sector was 44. In the tertiary sector; 1 was in a hotel or restaurant, 1 was in education and 41 or 93.2% were in health care.

In 2000, there were 7 workers who commuted into the municipality and 43 workers who commuted away. The municipality is a net exporter of workers, with about 6.1 workers leaving the municipality for every one entering. Of the working population, 17.2% used public transportation to get to work, and 53.1% used a private car.

== Religion ==
From the 2000 census, 146 or 90.7% were Roman Catholic, while 6 or 3.7% belonged to the Swiss Reformed Church.

== Education ==
In Unterems about 48 or (29.8%) of the population have completed non-mandatory upper secondary education, and 7 or (4.3%) have completed additional higher education (either university or a Fachhochschule). Of the 7 who completed tertiary schooling, 57.1% were Swiss men, 42.9% were Swiss women.

As of 2000, there were 8 students in Unterems who came from another municipality, while 15 residents attended schools outside the municipality.
