= Leuk District =

Coordinates: 46.317917°N 7.634439°E

Leuk Bezirk Leuk
- District
- Flag Coat of arms
- Country: Switzerland
- Canton: Valais
- Capital: Leuk

Area
  - Total: 335.9 km^{2} (129.7 sq mi)

Population (2020)
  - Total: 12,434
  - Density: 37.02/km^{2} (95.87/sq mi)
- Time zone: UTC+1 (CET)
  - Summer (DST): UTC+2 (CEST)
- Municipalities: 12

The district of Leuk (French: Loèche) is a district in the canton of Valais in Switzerland. It has a population of 12,434 (as of 31 December 2020).

== Municipalities ==
It contains the following municipalities:

Municipality	Population (31 December 2020)	Area km^{2}
Agarn	705	7.66
Albinen	243	15.48
Ergisch	177	30.13
Gampel-Bratsch	1,997	23.09
Guttet-Feschel	414	10.51
Inden	115	9.86
Leuk	3,991	55.15
Leukerbad	1,329	67.23
Oberems	120	50.27
Salgesch	1,567	11.34
Turtmann-Unterems	1,094	42.42
Varen	682	12.81
Total	12,434	336.01

== Coat of arms ==
The blazon of the municipal coat of arms is Gules, a Griffin rampant cowed Or langued and armed Argent holding a sword of the last.

== Demographics ==
Leuk has a population (as of December 2020) of 12,434. Most of the population (as of 2000) speaks German (10,675 or 91.8%) as their first language. French is the second most common (278 or 2.4%) and Albanian is the third (195 or 1.7%). There are 115 people who speak Italian and 8 people who speak Romansh.

As of 2008, the gender distribution of the population was 49.7% male and 50.3% female. The population was made up of 5,218 Swiss men (42.5% of the population) and 879 (7.2%) non-Swiss men. There were 5,430 Swiss women (44.3%) and 742 (6.0%) non-Swiss women. Of the population in the district, 6,201 or about 53.3% were born in Leuk and lived there in 2000. There were 2,995 or 25.8% who were born in the same canton, while 1,012 or 8.7% were born somewhere else in Switzerland, and 1,071 or 9.2% were born outside of Switzerland.

As of 2000, there were 4,795 people who were single and never married in the district. There were 5,769 married individuals, 716 widows or widowers and 351 individuals who are divorced.

There were 1,296 households that consist of only one person and 382 households with five or more people. Out of a total of 4,625 households that answered this question, 28.0% were households made up of just one person and there were 67 adults who lived with their parents. Of the rest of the households, there are 1,147 married couples without children, 1,637 married couples with children. There were 225 single parents with a child or children. There were 67 households that were made up of unrelated people and 186 households that were made up of some sort of institution or another collective housing.

The historical population is given in the following chart:

== Mergers and name changes ==
- The municipalities of Guttet and Feschel were combined on 1 October 2000.
- The municipalities of Gampel and Bratsch were combined on 1 January 2009.
- The municipalities of Turtmann and Unterems merged on 1 January 2013 into the new municipality of Turtmann-Unterems. The former municipality of Erschmatt merged into the municipality of Leuk.

== Politics ==
In the 2007 federal election, the most popular party was the CVP which received 66.4% of the vote. The next three most popular parties were the SVP (16.79%), the SP (12.46%) and the FDP (2.71%). In the federal election, a total of 6,389 votes were cast, and the voter turnout was 73.4%.

In the 2009 Conseil d'État/Staatsrat election, a total of 6,173 votes were cast, of which 304 or about 4.9% were invalid. The voter participation was 72.3%, which is much more than the cantonal average of 54.67%. In the 2007 Swiss Council of States election a total of 6,336 votes were cast, of which 280 or about 4.4% were invalid. The voter participation was 73.4%, which is much more than the cantonal average of 59.88%.

== Religion ==
From the 2000 census, 10,068 or 86.6% were Roman Catholic, while 496 or 4.3% belonged to the Swiss Reformed Church. Of the rest of the population, there were 144 members of an Orthodox church (or about 1.24% of the population), there were 6 individuals (or about 0.05% of the population) who belonged to the Christian Catholic Church, and there were 74 individuals (or about 0.64% of the population) who belonged to another Christian church. There were 345 (or about 2.97% of the population) who were Islamic. There were 10 individuals who were Buddhist, 1 person who was Hindu and 4 individuals who belonged to another church. 175 (or about 1.50% of the population) belonged to no church, are agnostic or atheist, and 342 individuals (or about 2.94% of the population) did not answer the question.

== Education ==
In Leuk, about 4,052 or (34.8%) of the population have completed non-mandatory upper secondary education, and 763 or (6.6%) have completed additional higher education (either University or a Fachhochschule). Of the 763 who completed tertiary schooling, 68.3% were Swiss men, 20.2% were Swiss women, 6.2% were non-Swiss men and 5.4% were non-Swiss women.
