= Embd =

- Municipality
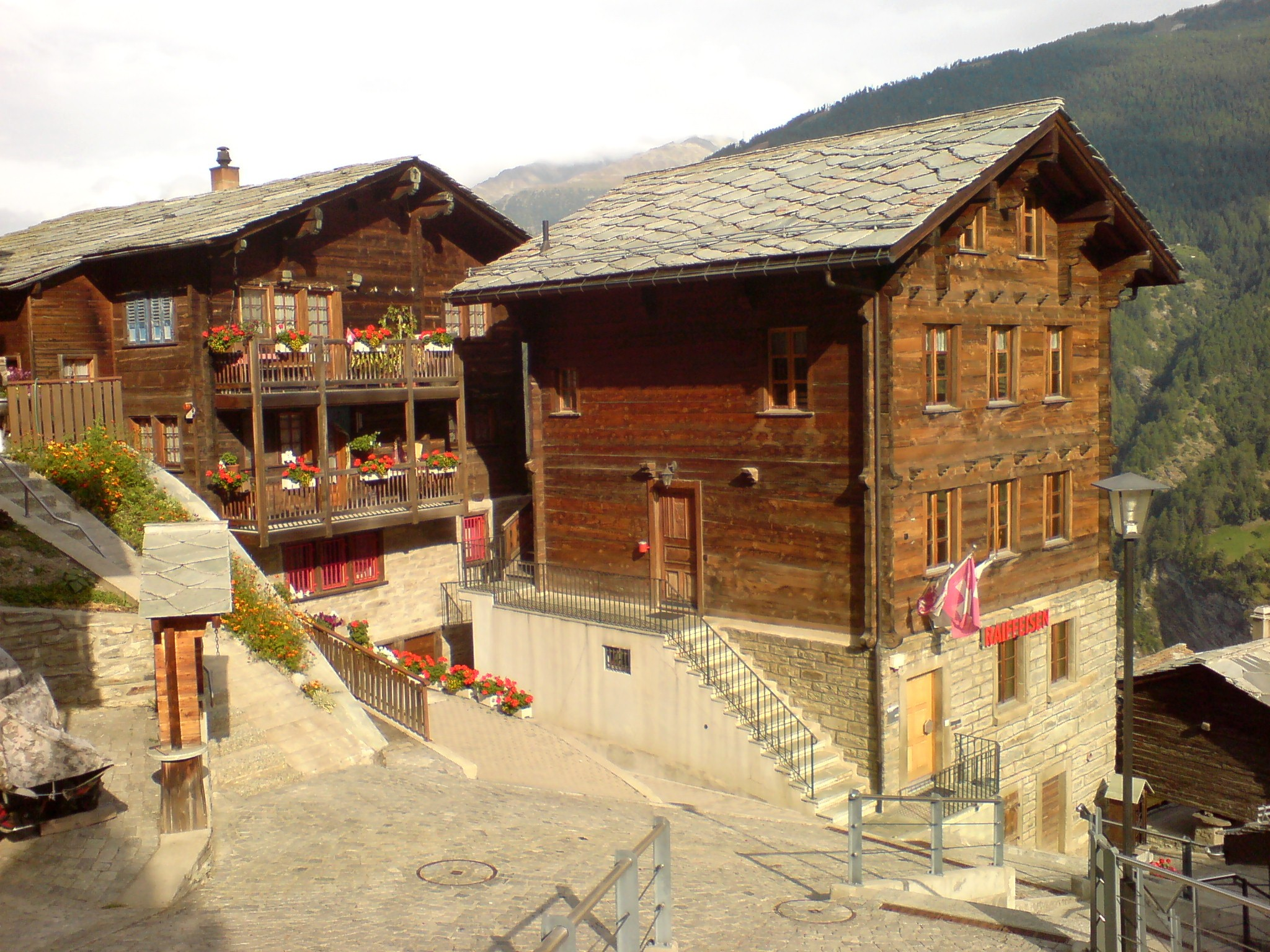

- Flag Coat of arms
- Location of Embd
- Location within Switzerland Location within Canton of Valais
- Coordinates: 46°13′N 7°49′E
- Country: Switzerland
- Canton: Valais
- District: Visp

Government
  - Mayor: Alex Bumann

Area
  - Total: 13.37 km^{2} (5.16 sq mi)
- Elevation: 1,356 m (4,449 ft)

Population (December 2002)
  - Total: 354
  - Density: 26.5/km^{2} (68.6/sq mi)
- Time zone: UTC+01:00 (CET)
  - Summer (DST): UTC+02:00 (CEST)
- Postal code: 3926
- SFOS number: 6283
- ISO 3166 code: CH-VS
- Surrounded by: Ergisch, Grächen, Oberems, Sankt Niklaus, Törbel, Unterbäch
- Twin towns: Ebikon (Switzerland)
- Website: www.embd.ch

Embd is a municipality in the district of Visp in the canton of Valais in Switzerland.

== History ==
Embd is first mentioned in 1250 as Emeda. In 1330 it was mentioned as Embda and Emda.

== Geography ==
Embd has an area, as of 2011, of 13.4 square kilometers (5.2 mi^{2}). Of this area, 24.6% is used for agricultural purposes, while 15.2% is forested. Of the rest of the land, 1.5% is settled (buildings or roads) and 58.7% is unproductive land.

The municipality is located in the Visp district, on the steep, left side of the Nikolai valley. It consists of a number of scattered settlements including the hamlet of Flue (1,358 m [4,455 ft]), which serves as the central settlement, and Kalpetran (850 m [2,790 ft]) which includes a station of the Brig-Visp-Zermatt-Bahn.

== Coat of arms ==
The blazon of the municipal coat of arms is Argent, issuant from Coupeaux Vert a Tower embattled Gules masoned, doored and windowed Sable, in chief two Keys of the last in saltire over a Latin Cross bottony Sable issuant from a Heart Gules.

== Demographics ==
Embd has a population (as of December 2020) of 280. As of 2008, 0.3% of the population are resident foreign nationals. Over the last 10 years (2000–2010 ) the population has changed at a rate of -13.6%. It has changed at a rate of -11.7% due to migration and at a rate of -0.5% due to births and deaths.

Most of the population (as of 2000) speaks German (348 or 98.6%) as their first language, French is the second most common (2 or 0.6%) and Serbo-Croatian is the third (2 or 0.6%). There is 1 person who speaks Italian.

As of 2008, the population was 49.8% male and 50.2% female. The population was made up of 161 Swiss men (49.5% of the population) and 1 (0.3%) non-Swiss men. There were 162 Swiss women (49.8%) and 1 (0.3%) non-Swiss women. Of the population in the municipality, 279 or about 79.0% were born in Embd and lived there in 2000. There were 33 or 9.3% who were born in the same canton, while 24 or 6.8% were born somewhere else in Switzerland, and 10 or 2.8% were born outside of Switzerland.

As of 2000, children and teenagers (0–19 years old) make up 23.2% of the population, while adults (20–64 years old) make up 58.6% and seniors (over 64 years old) make up 18.1%.

As of 2000, there were 146 people who were single and never married in the municipality. There were 194 married individuals, 13 widows or widowers and individuals who are divorced.

As of 2000, there were 123 private households in the municipality, and an average of 2.7 persons per household. There were 26 households that consist of only one person and 9 households with five or more people. In 2000, a total of 118 apartments (65.9% of the total) were permanently occupied, while 37 apartments (20.7%) were seasonally occupied and 24 apartments (13.4%) were empty. The vacancy rate for the municipality, in 2010, was 5.91%.

The historical population is given in the following chart:

== Politics ==
In the 2007 federal election the most popular party was the CVP which received 71.88% of the vote. The next three most popular parties were the SVP (17.78%), the SP (4.53%) and the FDP (4.09%). In the federal election, a total of 137 votes were cast, and the voter turnout was 51.5%.

In the 2009 Conseil d'État/Staatsrat election a total of 181 votes were cast, of which 11 or about 6.1% were invalid. The voter participation was 73.0%, which is much more than the cantonal average of 54.67%. In the 2007 Swiss Council of States election a total of 137 votes were cast, of which 2 or about 1.5% were invalid. The voter participation was 51.9%, which is much less than the cantonal average of 59.88%.

== Economy ==
As of 2010, Embd had an unemployment rate of 0.8%. As of 2008, there were 57 people employed in the primary economic sector and about 25 businesses involved in this sector. 7 people were employed in the secondary sector and there were 2 businesses in this sector. 26 people were employed in the tertiary sector, with 8 businesses in this sector. There were 157 residents of the municipality who were employed in some capacity, of which females made up 31.8% of the workforce.

In 2008 the total number of full-time equivalent jobs was 43. The number of jobs in the primary sector was 18, all of which were in agriculture. The number of jobs in the secondary sector was 7, all of which were in construction. The number of jobs in the tertiary sector was 18. In the tertiary sector; 7 or 38.9% were in wholesale or retail sales or the repair of motor vehicles, 4 or 22.2% were in the movement and storage of goods, 1 was in a hotel or restaurant, 2 or 11.1% were the insurance or financial industry, 3 or 16.7% were in education.

In 2000, there were 109 workers who commuted away from the municipality. Of the working population, 15.3% used public transportation to get to work, and 63.1% used a private car.

== Religion ==
From the 2000 census, 326 or 92.4% were Roman Catholic, while 10 or 2.8% belonged to the Swiss Reformed Church. Of the rest of the population, there were 2 members of an Orthodox church (or about 0.57% of the population). 12 (or about 3.40% of the population) belonged to no church, are agnostic or atheist, and 3 individuals (or about 0.85% of the population) did not answer the question.

== Education ==
In Embd about 138 or (39.1%) of the population have completed non-mandatory upper secondary education, and 9 or (2.5%) have completed additional higher education (either university or a Fachhochschule). Of the 9 who completed tertiary schooling, 88.9% were Swiss men, 11.1% were Swiss women.

During the 2010-2011 school year there were a total of 31 students in the Embd school system. The education system in the Canton of Valais allows young children to attend one year of non-obligatory Kindergarten. During that school year, there was one kindergarten class (KG1 or KG2) and 6 kindergarten students. The canton's school system requires students to attend six years of primary school. In Embd there were a total of 3 classes and 31 students in the primary school. The secondary school program consists of three lower, obligatory years of schooling (orientation classes), followed by three to five years of optional, advanced schools. All the lower and upper secondary students from Embd attend their school in a neighboring municipality.

As of 2000, there were 11 students from Embd who attended schools outside the municipality.
