= Eischoll =

- Municipality
- Flag Coat of arms
- Location of Eischoll
- Location within Switzerland Location within Canton of Valais
- Coordinates: 46°16′N 7°46′E
- Country: Switzerland
- Canton: Valais
- District: Raron

Government
  - Mayor: Patrick Amacker

Area
  - Total: 13.75 km^{2} (5.31 sq mi)
- Elevation: 1,230 m (4,040 ft)

Population (December 2002)
  - Total: 518
  - Density: 37.7/km^{2} (97.6/sq mi)
- Time zone: UTC+01:00 (CET)
  - Summer (DST): UTC+02:00 (CEST)
- Postal code: 3943
- SFOS number: 6194
- ISO 3166 code: CH-VS
- Surrounded by: Ergisch, Niedergesteln, Turtmann, Unterbäch
- Website: www.eischoll.ch

Eischoll is a municipality in the district of Raron in the canton of Valais in Switzerland.

== History ==
Eischoll is first mentioned in 1250 as Oiselz. In 1336 it was mentioned as Oysol and in 1418 as Eysoll.

== Geography ==
Aerial view (1945)

Eischoll has an area, as of 2011, of 13.8 square kilometers (5.3 mi^{2}). Of this area, 28.1% is used for agricultural purposes, while 45.5% is forested. Of the rest of the land, 2.3% is settled (buildings or roads) and 24.1% is unproductive land.

The municipality is located in the Westlich Raron district. The village is located at 1,230 m (4,040 ft) above the left bank of the Rhone river.

== Coat of arms ==
The blazon of the municipal coat of arms is Gules on a Plate a cross bottony sable.

== Demographics ==
Eischoll has a population (as of December 2020) of 450. As of 2008, 2.9% of the population are resident foreign nationals. Over the last 10 years (2000–2010 ) the population has changed at a rate of -8%. It has changed at a rate of -5.2% due to migration and at a rate of -2.6% due to births and deaths.

Most of the population (as of 2000) speaks German (485 or 97.0%) as their first language, Albanian is the second most common (10 or 2.0%) and French is the third (2 or 0.4%). There is 1 person who speaks Italian.

As of 2008, the population was 50.0% male and 50.0% female. The population was made up of 238 Swiss men (48.4% of the population) and 8 (1.6%) non-Swiss men. There were 238 Swiss women (48.4%) and 8 (1.6%) non-Swiss women. Of the population in the municipality, 375 or about 75.0% were born in Eischoll and lived there in 2000. There were 90 or 18.0% who were born in the same canton, while 20 or 4.0% were born somewhere else in Switzerland, and 15 or 3.0% were born outside of Switzerland.

As of 2000, children and teenagers (0–19 years old) make up 24.6% of the population, while adults (20–64 years old) make up 56% and seniors (over 64 years old) make up 19.4%.

As of 2000, there were 202 people who were single and never married in the municipality. There were 260 married individuals, 33 widows or widowers and 5 individuals who are divorced.

As of 2000, there were 197 private households in the municipality, and an average of 2.5 persons per household. There were 59 households that consist of only one person and 13 households with five or more people. In 2000, a total of 194 apartments (65.8% of the total) were permanently occupied, while 85 apartments (28.8%) were seasonally occupied and 16 apartments (5.4%) were empty. The vacancy rate for the municipality, in 2010, was 2.96%.

The historical population is given in the following chart:

== Sights ==
The entire village of Eischoll is designated as part of the Inventory of Swiss Heritage Sites.

== Politics ==
In the 2007 federal election the most popular party was the CVP which received 75.99% of the vote. The next three most popular parties were the SVP (15.93%), the SP (4.24%) and the FDP (1.83%). In the federal election, a total of 256 votes were cast, and the voter turnout was 62.9%.

In the 2009 Conseil d'État/Staatsrat election a total of 218 votes were cast, of which 10 or about 4.6% were invalid. The voter participation was 55.1%, which is similar to the cantonal average of 54.67%. In the 2007 Swiss Council of States election a total of 249 votes were cast, of which 5 or about 2.0% were invalid. The voter participation was 62.6%, which is similar to the cantonal average of 59.88%.

== Economy ==
As of 2010, Eischoll had an unemployment rate of 0.9%. As of 2008, there were 37 people employed in the primary economic sector and about 13 businesses involved in this sector. 20 people were employed in the secondary sector and there were 5 businesses in this sector. 43 people were employed in the tertiary sector, with 13 businesses in this sector. There were 199 residents of the municipality who were employed in some capacity, of which females made up 31.2% of the workforce.

In 2008 the total number of full-time equivalent jobs was 75. The number of jobs in the primary sector was 22, all of which were in agriculture. The number of jobs in the secondary sector was 18 of which 4 or (22.2%) were in manufacturing and 14 (77.8%) were in construction. The number of jobs in the tertiary sector was 35. In the tertiary sector; 4 or 11.4% were in wholesale or retail sales or the repair of motor vehicles, 18 or 51.4% were in the movement and storage of goods, 7 or 20.0% were in a hotel or restaurant, 4 or 11.4% were technical professionals or scientists, 3 or 8.6% were in education.

In 2000, there were 15 workers who commuted into the municipality and 133 workers who commuted away. The municipality is a net exporter of workers, with about 8.9 workers leaving the municipality for every one entering. Of the working population, 18.6% used public transportation to get to work, and 54.8% used a private car.

== Religion ==
From the 2000 census, 475 or 95.0% were Roman Catholic, while 10 or 2.0% belonged to the Swiss Reformed Church. There were 12 (or about 2.40% of the population) who were Islamic. 1 (or about 0.20% of the population) belonged to no church, are agnostic or atheist, and 2 individuals (or about 0.40% of the population) did not answer the question.

== Education ==
In Eischoll about 194 or (38.8%) of the population have completed non-mandatory upper secondary education, and 21 or (4.2%) have completed additional higher education (either university or a Fachhochschule). Of the 21 who completed tertiary schooling, 85.7% were Swiss men, 14.3% were Swiss women.

During the 2010-2011 school year there were a total of 55 students in the Eischoll school system. The education system in the Canton of Valais allows young children to attend one year of non-obligatory Kindergarten. During that school year, there was one kindergarten class (KG1 or KG2) and 10 kindergarten students. The canton's school system requires students to attend six years of primary school. In Eischoll there were a total of 4 classes and 55 students in the primary school. The secondary school program consists of three lower, obligatory years of schooling (orientation classes), followed by three to five years of optional, advanced schools. All the lower and upper secondary students from Eischoll attend their school in a neighboring municipality.

As of 2000, there were 40 students from Eischoll who attended schools outside the municipality.
