= Turtmann =

- Former municipality
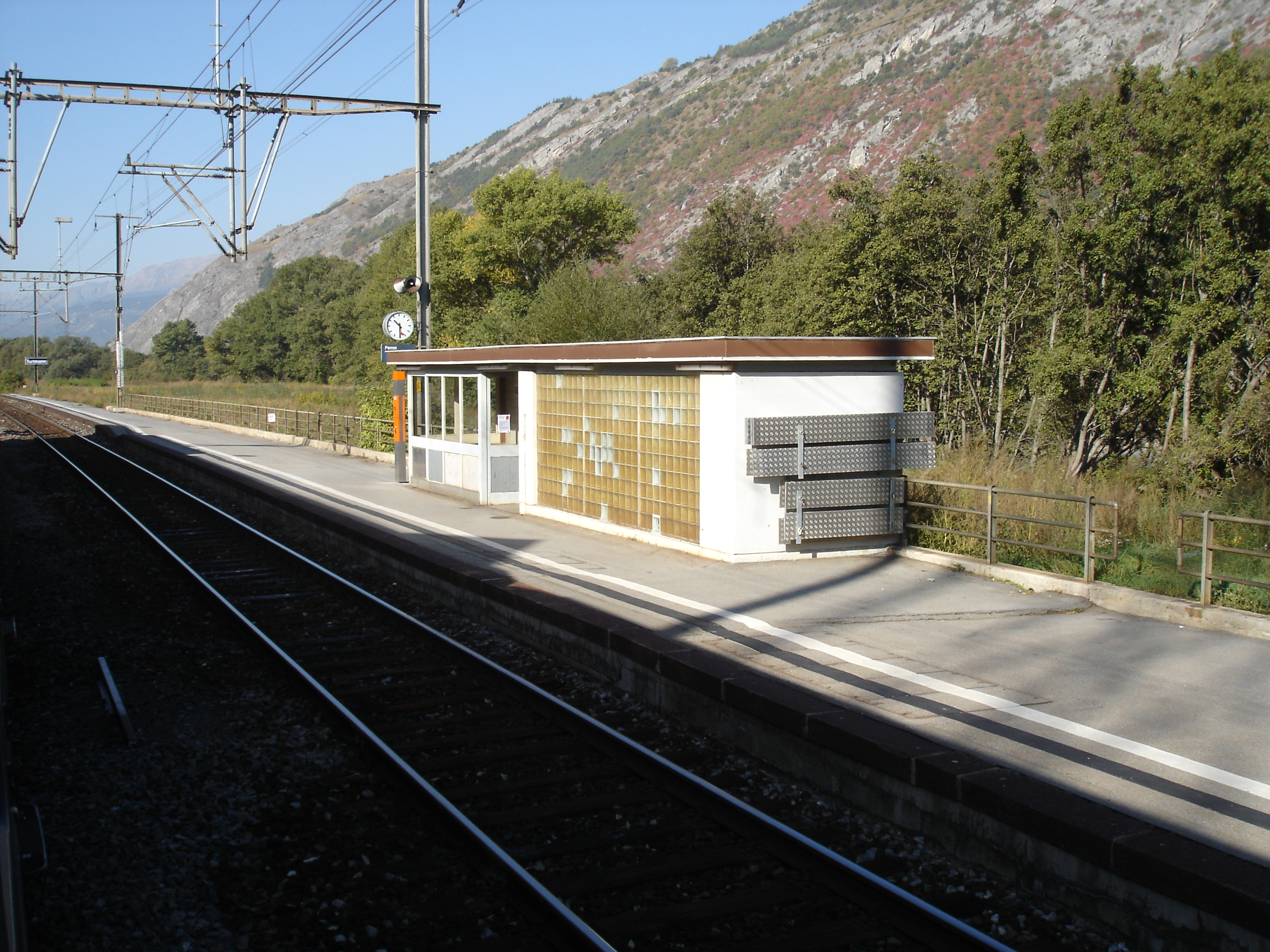
- Turtmann village train station

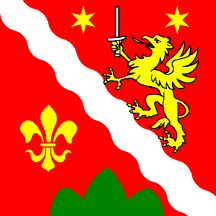
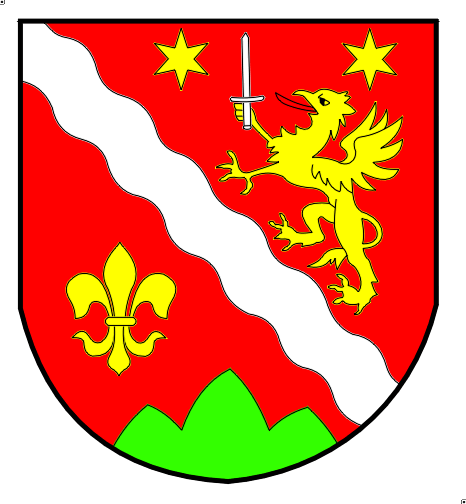
- Flag Coat of arms
- Location of Turtmann
- Location within Switzerland Location within Canton of Valais
- Coordinates: 46°18′N 7°42′E
- Country: Switzerland
- Canton: Valais
- District: Leuk

Government
  - Mayor: Christian Jäger

Area
  - Total: 6.8 km^{2} (2.6 sq mi)
- Elevation: 640 m (2,100 ft)

Population (December 2011)
  - Total: 997
  - Density: 150/km^{2} (380/sq mi)
- Time zone: UTC+01:00 (CET)
  - Summer (DST): UTC+02:00 (CEST)
- Postal code: 3946
- SFOS number: 6114
- ISO 3166 code: CH-VS
- Surrounded by: Agarn, Bratsch, Eischoll, Ergisch, Gampel, Leuk, Niedergesteln, Steg, Unterems
- Website: www.turtmann.ch

Turtmann (French: Tourtemagne) is a former municipality in the district of Leuk in the canton of Valais in Switzerland. The municipalities of Turtmann and Unterems merged on 1 January 2013 into the new municipality of Turtmann-Unterems.

== History ==
Aerial view (1955)

Turtmann is first mentioned in 1050 as Curtmannonis. In 1210 it was mentioned as Torthemanei and Tortemagny. Until 2003 Turtmann had a military airfield which was used by Swiss Air Force Northrop F-5 of fighter squadron 13. The airfield is now just for the use of civil aircraft. After the withdrawal of the Swiss Air Force the aircraft cavern was used for the storage of Swiss Army M113 armored personnel carriers.

== Geography ==
Turtmann had an area, as of 2011, of 6.8 square kilometers (2.6 mi^{2}). Of this area, 46.2% is used for agricultural purposes, while 36.4% is forested. Of the rest of the land, 14.2% is settled (buildings or roads) and 3.2% is unproductive land.

The former municipality is located in the Leuk district, south of the Rhone river down in the Rhone valley at the entrance to the Turtmann valley. It consists of the village of Turtmann and the hamlets of Tännu and Ried.

== Coat of arms ==
The blazon of the municipal coat of arms is Gules, a Bend wavy Argent a Griffin passant coward Or holding in dexter a sword of the second in chief two Mullets of Six of the third in base Coupeaux Vert and fleur-de-lys of the third.

== Demographics ==
Turtmann had a population (as of 2011) of 997. As of 2008, 8.4% of the population are resident foreign nationals. Over the last 10 years (1999–2009) the population has changed at a rate of -5.6%. It has changed at a rate of -4.2% due to migration and at a rate of 0.7% due to births and deaths.

Most of the population (as of 2000) speaks German (923 or 93.0%) as their first language, Albanian is the second most common (36 or 3.6%) and Italian is the third (15 or 1.5%). There are 7 people who speak French and 1 person who speaks Romansh.

As of 2008, the gender distribution of the population was 47.2% male and 52.8% female. The population was made up of 413 Swiss men (42.6% of the population) and 44 (4.5%) non-Swiss men. There were 477 Swiss women (49.2%) and 35 (3.6%) non-Swiss women. Of the population in the municipality 569 or about 57.4% were born in Turtmann and lived there in 2000. There were 243 or 24.5% who were born in the same canton, while 57 or 5.7% were born somewhere else in Switzerland, and 101 or 10.2% were born outside of Switzerland.

The age distribution of the population (as of 2000) is children and teenagers (0–19 years old) make up 30.7% of the population, while adults (20–64 years old) make up 56.9% and seniors (over 64 years old) make up 12.4%.

As of 2000, there were 443 people who were single and never married in the municipality. There were 459 married individuals, 58 widows or widowers and 32 individuals who are divorced.

As of 2000, there were 350 private households in the municipality, and an average of 2.8 persons per household. There were 87 households that consist of only one person and 53 households with five or more people. Out of a total of 360 households that answered this question, 24.2% were households made up of just one person and there were 10 adults who lived with their parents. Of the rest of the households, there are 79 married couples without children, 151 married couples with children There were 18 single parents with a child or children. There were 5 households that were made up of unrelated people and 10 households that were made up of some sort of institution or another collective housing.

In 2000 there were 123 single family homes (or 55.7% of the total) out of a total of 221 inhabited buildings. There were 59 multi-family buildings (26.7%), along with 25 multi-purpose buildings that were mostly used for housing (11.3%) and 14 other use buildings (commercial or industrial) that also had some housing (6.3%).

In 2000, a total of 325 apartments (85.5% of the total) were permanently occupied, while 33 apartments (8.7%) were seasonally occupied and 22 apartments (5.8%) were empty. As of 2009, the construction rate of new housing units was 3.1 new units per 1000 residents. The vacancy rate for the municipality, in 2010, was 2.25%.

The historical population is given in the following chart:

== Sights ==
The entire village of Turtmann is designated as part of the Inventory of Swiss Heritage Sites.

== Politics ==
In the 2007 federal election the most popular party was the CVP which received 62.45% of the vote. The next three most popular parties were the SVP (25.62%), the SP (6.16%) and the FDP (4.64%). In the federal election, a total of 561 votes were cast, and the voter turnout was 77.6%.

In the 2009 Conseil d'État/Staatsrat election a total of 544 votes were cast, of which 15 or about 2.8% were invalid. The voter participation was 73.4%, which is much more than the cantonal average of 54.67%. In the 2007 Swiss Council of States election a total of 558 votes were cast, of which 26 or about 4.7% were invalid. The voter participation was 77.2%, which is much more than the cantonal average of 59.88%.

== Economy ==
As of 2010, Turtmann had an unemployment rate of 2.1%. As of 2008, there were 82 people employed in the primary economic sector and about 31 businesses involved in this sector. 147 people were employed in the secondary sector and there were 17 businesses in this sector. 155 people were employed in the tertiary sector, with 42 businesses in this sector. There were 447 residents of the municipality who were employed in some capacity, of which females made up 34.9% of the workforce.

In 2008 the total number of full-time equivalent jobs was 307. The number of jobs in the primary sector was 42, all of which were in agriculture. The number of jobs in the secondary sector was 140 of which 93 or (66.4%) were in manufacturing and 44 (31.4%) were in construction. The number of jobs in the tertiary sector was 125. In the tertiary sector; 42 or 33.6% were in wholesale or retail sales or the repair of motor vehicles, 22 or 17.6% were in the movement and storage of goods, 21 or 16.8% were in a hotel or restaurant, 3 or 2.4% were the insurance or financial industry, 12 or 9.6% were technical professionals or scientists, 5 or 4.0% were in education and 4 or 3.2% were in health care.

In 2000, there were 193 workers who commuted into the municipality and 277 workers who commuted away. The municipality is a net exporter of workers, with about 1.4 workers leaving the municipality for every one entering. Of the working population, 19.7% used public transportation to get to work, and 51.7% used a private car.

== Religion ==
From the 2000 census, 833 or 84.0% were Roman Catholic, while 24 or 2.4% belonged to the Swiss Reformed Church. Of the rest of the population, there was 1 member of an Orthodox church, and there were 10 individuals (or about 1.01% of the population) who belonged to another Christian church. There were 77 (or about 7.76% of the population) who were Islamic. There was 1 person who was Buddhist. 11 (or about 1.11% of the population) belonged to no church, are agnostic or atheist, and 40 individuals (or about 4.03% of the population) did not answer the question.

== Education ==
In Turtmann about 347 or (35.0%) of the population have completed non-mandatory upper secondary education, and 62 or (6.3%) have completed additional higher education (either university or a Fachhochschule). Of the 62 who completed tertiary schooling, 80.6% were Swiss men, 14.5% were Swiss women.

During the 2010-2011 school year there were a total of 91 students in the Turtmann school system. The education system in the Canton of Valais allows young children to attend one year of non-obligatory Kindergarten. During that school year, there 2 kindergarten classes (KG1 or KG2) and 25 kindergarten students. The canton's school system requires students to attend six years of primary school. In Turtmann there were a total of 6 classes and 91 students in the primary school. The secondary school program consists of three lower, obligatory years of schooling (orientation classes), followed by three to five years of optional, advanced schools. All the lower and upper secondary students from Turtmann attend their school in a neighboring municipality.

As of 2000, there were 78 students from Turtmann who attended schools outside the municipality.
