= Ergisch =

- Municipality
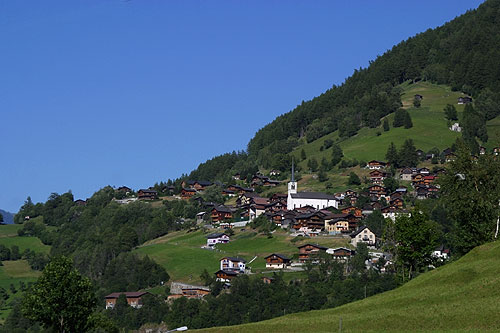

- Flag Coat of arms
- Location of Ergisch
- Location within Switzerland Location within Canton of Valais
- Coordinates: 46°17′N 7°42′E
- Country: Switzerland
- Canton: Valais
- District: Leuk

Government
  - Mayor: Gerhard Eggs

Area
  - Total: 30.1 km^{2} (11.6 sq mi)
- Elevation: 1,090 m (3,580 ft)

Population (December 2002)
  - Total: 150
  - Density: 5.0/km^{2} (13/sq mi)
- Time zone: UTC+01:00 (CET)
  - Summer (DST): UTC+02:00 (CEST)
- Postal code: 3947
- SFOS number: 6104
- ISO 3166 code: CH-VS
- Surrounded by: Eischoll, Embd, Oberems, Sankt Niklaus, Turtmann, Unterbäch, Unterems
- Website: https://www.ergisch.ch SFSO statistics

Ergisch is a municipality in the district of Leuk in the canton of Valais in Switzerland.

== History ==
Ergisch is first mentioned in 1203 as Mons de Argessa.

== Geography ==
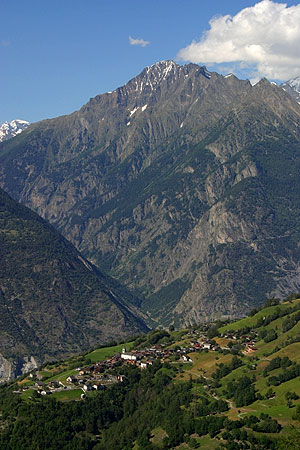
Ergisch village

Ergisch has an area, as of 2011, of 29.8 square kilometers (11.5 mi^{2}). Of this area, 20.9% is used for agricultural purposes, while 38.0% is forested. Of the rest of the land, 0.9% is settled (buildings or roads) and 40.1% is unproductive land.

The municipality is located in the Leuk district, at an elevation of 1,090 m (3,580 ft) on the slope left side of the Rhone valley at the entrance to the Turtmann valley.

== Coat of arms ==
The blazon of the municipal coat of arms is Per fess Azure three Mullets of Six Argent one and two and Gules a Fleur-de-lis and a Double Cross of the second.

== Demographics ==
Ergisch has a population (as of December 2020) of 177. As of 2008, 5.2% of the population are resident foreign nationals. Over the last 10 years (1999–2009 ) the population has changed at a rate of 17.5%. It has changed at a rate of 11.3% due to migration and at a rate of -6.9% due to births and deaths.

All of the population (as of 2000) speaks German.

As of 2008, the gender distribution of the population was 50.0% male and 50.0% female. The population was made up of 89 Swiss men (47.3% of the population) and 5 (2.7%) non-Swiss men. There were 89 Swiss women (47.3%) and 5 (2.7%) non-Swiss women. Of the population in the municipality 118 or about 67.0% were born in Ergisch and lived there in 2000. There were 39 or 22.2% who were born in the same canton, while 15 or 8.5% were born somewhere else in Switzerland, and 4 or 2.3% were born outside of Switzerland.

The age distribution of the population (as of 2000) is children and teenagers (0–19 years old) make up 25.6% of the population, while adults (20–64 years old) make up 54.5% and seniors (over 64 years old) make up 19.9%.

As of 2000, there were 76 people who were single and never married in the municipality. There were 82 married individuals, 15 widows or widowers and 3 individuals who are divorced.

As of 2000, there were 68 private households in the municipality, and an average of 2.6 persons per household. There were 19 households that consist of only one person and 7 households with five or more people. Out of a total of 69 households that answered this question, 27.5% were households made up of just one person and there were 3 adults who lived with their parents. Of the rest of the households, there are 15 married couples without children, 27 married couples with children There were 2 single parents with a child or children. There were 2 households that were made up of unrelated people and 1 household that was made up of some sort of institution or another collective housing.

In 2000 there were 140 single family homes (or 77.3% of the total) out of a total of 181 inhabited buildings. There were 31 multi-family buildings (17.1%), along with 5 multi-purpose buildings that were mostly used for housing (2.8%) and 5 other use buildings (commercial or industrial) that also had some housing (2.8%).

In 2000, a total of 67 apartments (30.7% of the total) were permanently occupied, while 88 apartments (40.4%) were seasonally occupied and 63 apartments (28.9%) were empty. As of 2009, the construction rate of new housing units was 5.3 new units per 1000 residents. The vacancy rate for the municipality, in 2010, was 0.87%.

The historical population is given in the following chart:

== Politics ==
In the 2007 federal election the most popular party was the CVP which received 65.05% of the vote. The next three most popular parties were the SVP (20.03%), the SP (12.63%) and the FDP (2.17%). In the federal election, a total of 121 votes were cast, and the voter turnout was 79.6%.

In the 2009 Conseil d'État/Staatsrat election a total of 122 votes were cast, of which 8 or about 6.6% were invalid. The voter participation was 82.4%, which is much more than the cantonal average of 54.67%. In the 2007 Swiss Council of States election a total of 121 votes were cast, of which 7 or about 5.8% were invalid. The voter participation was 79.6%, which is much more than the cantonal average of 59.88%.

== Economy ==
As of 2010, Ergisch had an unemployment rate of 1.3%. As of 2008, there were 28 people employed in the primary economic sector and about 14 businesses involved in this sector. 3 people were employed in the secondary sector and there were 2 businesses in this sector. 10 people were employed in the tertiary sector, with 5 businesses in this sector. There were 77 residents of the municipality who were employed in some capacity, of which females made up 41.6% of the workforce.

In 2008 the total number of full-time equivalent jobs was 23. The number of jobs in the primary sector was 12, all of which were in agriculture. The number of jobs in the secondary sector was 3 of which 2 or (66.7%) were in manufacturing and 1 was in construction. The number of jobs in the tertiary sector was 8. In the tertiary sector; 2 or 25.0% were in wholesale or retail sales or the repair of motor vehicles, 4 or 50.0% were in a hotel or restaurant, 1 was in education.

In 2000, there were 5 workers who commuted into the municipality and 58 workers who commuted away. The municipality is a net exporter of workers, with about 11.6 workers leaving the municipality for every one entering. Of the working population, 14.3% used public transportation to get to work, and 63.6% used a private car.

== Religion ==
From the 2000 census, 163 or 92.6% were Roman Catholic, while 8 or 4.5% belonged to the Swiss Reformed Church. Of the rest of the population, there was 1 individual who belongs to the Christian Catholic Church. 4 (or about 2.27% of the population) belonged to no church, are agnostic or atheist.

== Education ==
In Ergisch about 53 or (30.1%) of the population have completed non-mandatory upper secondary education, and 4 or (2.3%) have completed additional higher education (either university or a Fachhochschule). Of the 4 who completed tertiary schooling, all were Swiss men.

As of 2000, there were 4 students from Ergisch who attended schools outside the municipality.
