= Agarn =

- Municipality
- Flag Coat of arms
- Location of Agarn
- Location within Switzerland Location within Canton of Valais
- Coordinates: 46°17′N 7°39′E
- Country: Switzerland
- Canton: Valais
- District: Leuk

Government
  - Mayor: Thomas Matter

Area
  - Total: 7.7 km^{2} (3.0 sq mi)
- Elevation: 620 m (2,030 ft)

Population (2002)
  - Total: 757
  - Density: 98/km^{2} (250/sq mi)
- Time zone: UTC+01:00 (CET)
  - Summer (DST): UTC+02:00 (CEST)
- Postal code: 3951
- SFOS number: 6101
- ISO 3166 code: CH-VS
- Surrounded by: Chandolin, Leuk, Oberems, Saint-Luc, Turtmann, Unterems
- Website: www.agarn.ch

Agarn (Walliser German: Agaru) is a municipality in the district of Leukin the German-speaking part of the canton of Valais in Switzerland.

== History ==
Historic aerial photograph by Werner Friedli from 1955

Agarn is first mentioned in 1252 as Aert. In 1267 it was mentioned as Ayert and in the 16th century it was known as Agaren. Agarn was twice nearly totally burned down, in 1799 and 1899.

== Geography ==
Agarn has an area, as of 2009, of 7.7 square kilometers (3.0 mi^{2}). Of this area, 1.3 km^{2} (0.50 mi^{2}) or 17.0% is used for agricultural purposes, while 2.55 km^{2} (0.98 mi^{2}) or 33.3% is forested. Of the rest of the land, 0.34 km^{2} (0.13 mi^{2}) or 4.4% is settled (buildings or roads), 0.06 km^{2} (15 acres) or 0.8% is either rivers or lakes and 3.4 km^{2} (1.3 mi^{2}) or 44.4% is unproductive land.

Of the built up area, housing and buildings made up 2.7% and transportation infrastructure made up 0.7%. Out of the forested land, 30.9% of the total land area is heavily forested and 1.7% is covered with orchards or small clusters of trees. Of the agricultural land, 4.8% is used for growing crops and 7.3% is pastures, while 2.1% is used for orchards or vine crops and 2.7% is used for alpine pastures. All the water in the municipality is in lakes. Of the unproductive areas, 9.3% is unproductive vegetation, 33.3% is too rocky for vegetation and 1.8% of the land is covered by glaciers.

The municipality is located in the Leuk district, on an alluvial fan on the southern slope of the Rhone valley. It consists of the former linear village of Agarn.

== Coat of arms ==
The blazon of the municipal coat of arms is Vert, a Pile embowed Argent, in dexter chief a cross couped, in sinister base a dove volant of the same.

== Demographics ==
Agarn has a population (as of December 2020) of 705. As of 2008, 8.3% of the population are resident foreign nationals. Over the last 10 years (1999–2009 ) the population has changed at a rate of -0.9%. It has changed at a rate of -1.7% due to migration and at a rate of 1.9% due to births and deaths.

Most of the population (as of 2000) speaks German (684 or 90.2%) as their first language, Albanian is the second most common (35 or 4.6%) and Italian is the third (12 or 1.6%). There are 10 people who speak French.

As of 2008, the gender distribution of the population was 51.1% male and 48.9% female. The population was made up of 362 Swiss men (47.0% of the population) and 32 (4.2%) non-Swiss men. There were 343 Swiss women (44.5%) and 34 (4.4%) non-Swiss women. Of the population in the municipality 420 or about 55.4% were born in Agarn and lived there in 2000. There were 210 or 27.7% who were born in the same canton, while 46 or 6.1% were born somewhere else in Switzerland, and 68 or 9.0% were born outside of Switzerland.

The age distribution of the population (as of 2000) is children and teenagers (0–19 years old) make up 27.6% of the population, while adults (20–64 years old) make up 60.9% and seniors (over 64 years old) make up 11.5%.

As of 2000, there were 309 people who were single and never married in the municipality. There were 383 married individuals, 45 widows or widowers and 21 individuals who are divorced.

As of 2000, there were 284 private households in the municipality, and an average of 2.6 persons per household. There were 73 households that consist of only one person and 30 households with five or more people. Out of a total of 289 households that answered this question, 25.3% were households made up of just one person and there were 6 adults who lived with their parents. Of the rest of the households, there are 76 married couples without children, 116 married couples with children There were 12 single parents with a child or children. There was 1 household that was made up of unrelated people and 5 households that were made up of some sort of institution or another collective housing.

In 2000 there were 118 single family homes (or 62.8% of the total) out of a total of 188 inhabited buildings. There were 45 multi-family buildings (23.9%), along with 7 multi-purpose buildings that were mostly used for housing (3.7%) and 18 other use buildings (commercial or industrial) that also had some housing (9.6%).

In 2000, a total of 268 apartments (90.5% of the total) were permanently occupied, while 22 apartments (7.4%) were seasonally occupied and 6 apartments (2.0%) were empty. As of 2009, the construction rate of new housing units was 3.9 new units per 1000 residents. The vacancy rate for the municipality, in 2010, was 1.57%.

The historical population is given in the following chart:

== Politics ==
In the 2007 federal election the most popular party was the CVP which received 64.49% of the vote. The next three most popular parties were the SP (23.06%), the SVP (10.62%) and the Green Party (0.79%). In the federal election, a total of 462 votes were cast, and the voter turnout was 81.3%.

In the 2009 Conseil d'État/Staatsrat election a total of 448 votes were cast, of which 24 or about 5.4% were invalid. The voter participation was 79.2%, which is much more than the cantonal average of 54.67%. In the 2007 Swiss Council of States election a total of 455 votes were cast, of which 20 or about 4.4% were invalid. The voter participation was 80.3%, which is much more than the cantonal average of 59.88%.

== Economy ==
As of 2010, Agarn had an unemployment rate of 1.6%. As of 2008, there were 27 people employed in the primary economic sector and about 15 businesses involved in this sector. 96 people were employed in the secondary sector and there were 15 businesses in this sector. 93 people were employed in the tertiary sector, with 26 businesses in this sector. There were 349 residents of the municipality who were employed in some capacity, of which females made up 36.4% of the workforce.

In 2008 the total number of full-time equivalent jobs was 182. The number of jobs in the primary sector was 12, all of which were in agriculture. The number of jobs in the secondary sector was 90 of which 43 or (47.8%) were in manufacturing and 48 (53.3%) were in construction. The number of jobs in the tertiary sector was 80. In the tertiary sector; 35 or 43.8% were in wholesale or retail sales or the repair of motor vehicles, 2 or 2.5% were in the movement and storage of goods, 13 or 16.3% were in a hotel or restaurant, 1 was in the information industry, 1 was the insurance or financial industry, 1 was a technical professional or scientist, 5 or 6.3% were in education.

In 2000, there were 81 workers who commuted into the municipality and 260 workers who commuted away. The municipality is a net exporter of workers, with about 3.2 workers leaving the municipality for every one entering. Of the working population, 20.3% used public transportation to get to work, and 60.2% used a private car.

== Religion ==
From the 2000 census, 679 or 89.6% were Roman Catholic, while 7 or 0.9% belonged to the Swiss Reformed Church. Of the rest of the population, there were 3 members of an Orthodox church (or about 0.40% of the population), and there were 8 individuals (or about 1.06% of the population) who belonged to another Christian church. There were 41 (or about 5.41% of the population) who were Islamic. 5 (or about 0.66% of the population) belonged to no church, are agnostic or atheist, and 19 individuals (or about 2.51% of the population) did not answer the question.

The church of Agarn is a Marian church. The pastor is H.H. Anderas Werlen.

== Education ==
In Agarn about 262 or (34.6%) of the population have completed non-mandatory upper secondary education, and 38 or (5.0%) have completed additional higher education (either university or a Fachhochschule). Of the 38 who completed tertiary schooling, 78.9% were Swiss men, 13.2% were Swiss women.

During the 2010–2011 school year there were a total of 54 students in the Agarn school system. The education system in the Canton of Valais allows young children to attend one year of non-obligatory Kindergarten. During that school year, there was one kindergarten class (KG1 or KG2) and 9 kindergarten students. The canton's school system requires students to attend six years of primary school. In Agarn there were a total of 5 classes and 54 students in the primary school. The secondary school program consists of three lower, obligatory years of schooling (orientation classes), followed by three to five years of optional, advanced schools. All the lower and upper secondary students from Agarn attend their school in a neighboring municipality.

As of 2000, there was one student in Agarn who came from another municipality, while 58 residents attended schools outside the municipality.
