= Oberems =

- Municipality
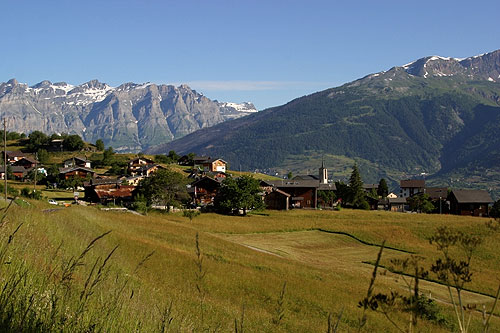

- Flag Coat of arms
- Location of Oberems
- Location within Switzerland Location within Canton of Valais
- Coordinates: 46°16′N 7°41′E
- Country: Switzerland
- Canton: Valais
- District: Leuk

Government
  - Mayor: Reinhard Zeiter

Area
  - Total: 84.6 km^{2} (32.7 sq mi)
- Elevation: 1,335 m (4,380 ft)

Population (December 2002)
  - Total: 136
  - Density: 1.61/km^{2} (4.16/sq mi)
- Time zone: UTC+01:00 (CET)
  - Summer (DST): UTC+02:00 (CEST)
- Postal code: 3948
- SFOS number: 6112
- ISO 3166 code: CH-VS
- Surrounded by: Agarn, Ayer, Embd, Ergisch, Randa, Saint-Luc, Sankt Niklaus, Unterems
- Website: www.oberems.ch/gemeinde/index.htm

Oberems is a municipality in the district of Leuk in the canton of Valais in Switzerland.

== History ==
Oberems is first mentioned in 1101 as superiori Emesa.

Oberems recorded the highest "Yes" vote of any municipality in Switzerland in the 2021 Swiss same-sex marriage referendum on 26 September 2021; 85.7% of town voters who participated in the referendum voted to legalise same-sex marriage.

== Geography ==
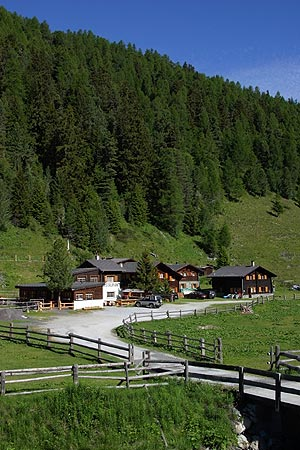
Mine in the Turtmann valley

Oberems has an area, as of 2011, of 84.6 square kilometers (32.7 mi^{2}). Of this area, 15.3% is used for agricultural purposes, while 13.5% is forested. Of the rest of the land, 0.4% is settled (buildings or roads) and 70.8% is unproductive land.

The municipality is located in the Leuk district, on a terrace above the entrance to the Turtmann valley into the Rhone valley. It consists of the villages of Ahorn and Bodmen and several scattered hamlets, such as Gruben/Meiden.

== Coat of arms ==
The blazon of the municipal coat of arms is Per fess Or a Crow displayed Sable between and above two Mullets of Five Argent and Argent from a two-peaked mountain Vert pouring water palewise wavy Azure.

== Demographics ==
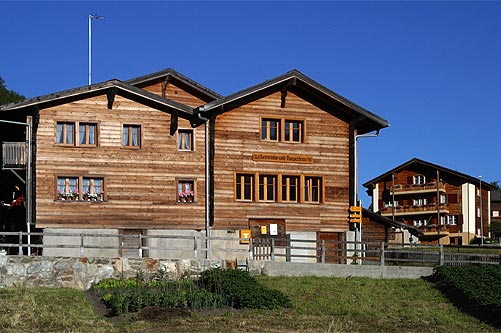
Houses in Oberems

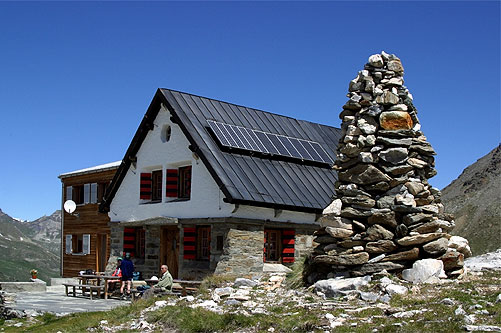
Building in the Turtmann valley

Oberems has a population (as of December 2020) of 120. As of 2008, 2.3% of the population are resident foreign nationals. During the 10-year period from 1999 to 2009, the population changed at a rate of 0.8%. It has changed at a rate of 7.5% due to migration and at a rate of 0% due to births and deaths.

All of the population (as of 2000) speaks German.

As of 2008, the gender distribution of the population was 49.3% male and 50.7% female. The population was made up of 63 Swiss men (47.0% of the population) and 3 (2.2%) non-Swiss men. There were 67 Swiss women (50.0%) and 1 (0.7%) non-Swiss woman. Of the population in the municipality, 85 or about 68.0% were born in Oberems and lived there in 2000. There were 23 or 18.4% who were born in the same canton, while 11 or 8.8% were born somewhere else in Switzerland, and 4 or 3.2% were born outside of Switzerland.

The age distribution of the population (as of 2000): Children and teenagers (0–19 years old) make up 24.8% of the population, while adults (20–64 years old) make up 57.6% and seniors (over 64 years old) make up 17.6%.

As of 2000, there were 56 people who were single and never married in the municipality. There were 58 married individuals, 11 widows or widowers and individuals who are divorced.

As of 2000, there were 50 private households in the municipality, with an average of 2.4 persons per household. There were 18 households that consist of only one person and 5 households with five or more people. Out of a total of 52 households that answered this question, 34.6% were households made up of just one person and there was 1 adult who lived with their parents. Of the rest of the households, there are 12 married couples without children, 16 married couples with children. There were 2 single parents with a child or children. There was 1 household that was made up of unrelated people and 2 households that were made up of some sort of institution or another collective housing.

In 2000, there were 96 single-family homes (or 74.4% of the total) out of a total of 129 inhabited buildings. There were 27 multi-family buildings (20.9%), along with 3 multi-purpose buildings that were used mostly for housing (2.3%) and 3 other-use buildings (commercial or industrial) that also had some housing (2.3%).

In 2000, a total of 48 apartments (29.1% of the total) were permanently occupied, while 88 apartments (53.3%) were seasonally occupied and 29 apartments (17.6%) were empty. The vacancy rate for the municipality, in 2010, was 4.24%.

The historical population is given in the following chart:

== Politics ==
In the 2007 federal election, the most popular party was the CVP which received 53.71% of the vote. The next three most popular parties were the SVP (24.03%), the SP (17.67%) and the Green Party (3.89%). In the federal election, a total of 44 votes were cast, and the voter turnout was 44.9%.

In the 2009 Conseil d'État/Staatsrat election, a total of 43 votes were cast, of which about 0.0% were invalid. The voter participation was 43.9%, which is much less than the cantonal average of 54.67%. In the 2007 Swiss Council of States election a total of 45 votes were cast, of which about 0.0% were invalid. The voter participation was 46.9%, which is much less than the cantonal average of 59.88%.

== Economy ==
As of 2010, Oberems had an unemployment rate of 0.1%. As of 2008, there were 13 people employed in the primary economic sector and about 7 businesses involved in this sector. 3 people were employed in the secondary sector and there was 1 business in this sector. 19 people were employed in the tertiary sector, with 6 businesses in this sector. There were 52 residents of the municipality who were employed in some capacity, of which females made up 36.5% of the workforce.

In 2008, the total number of full-time equivalent jobs was 26. The number of jobs in the primary sector was 7, all of which were in agriculture. The number of jobs in the secondary sector was 3 of which (0.0%) were in manufacturing The number of jobs in the tertiary sector was 16. In the tertiary sector; 1 was in the sale or repair of motor vehicles, 4 or 25.0% were in the movement and storage of goods, 10 or 62.5% were in a hotel or restaurant, .

In 2000, there were 6 workers who commuted into the municipality and 26 workers who commuted away. The municipality is a net exporter of workers, with about 4.3 workers leaving the municipality for every one entering. Of the working population, 15.4% used public transportation to get to work, and 55.8% used a private car.

== Religion ==
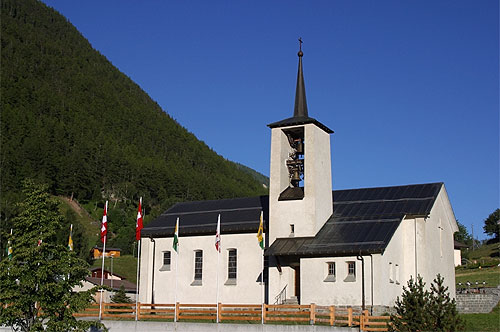
A church in Oberems

From the 2000 census, 118 or 94.4% were Roman Catholic, while 2 or 1.6% belonged to the Swiss Reformed Church. Of the rest of the population, there was 1 member of an Orthodox church. 2 (or about 1.60% of the population) belonged to no church, are agnostic or atheist, and 2 individuals (or about 1.60% of the population) did not answer the question.

== Education ==
In Oberems, about 44 or (35.2%) of the population have completed non-mandatory upper secondary education, and 8 or (6.4%) have completed additional higher education (either university or a Fachhochschule). Of the 8 who completed tertiary schooling, 62.5% were Swiss men, 12.5% were Swiss women.

As of 2000, there were 7 students in Oberems who came from another municipality, while 10 residents attended schools outside the municipality.
