= Unterbäch =

- Municipality
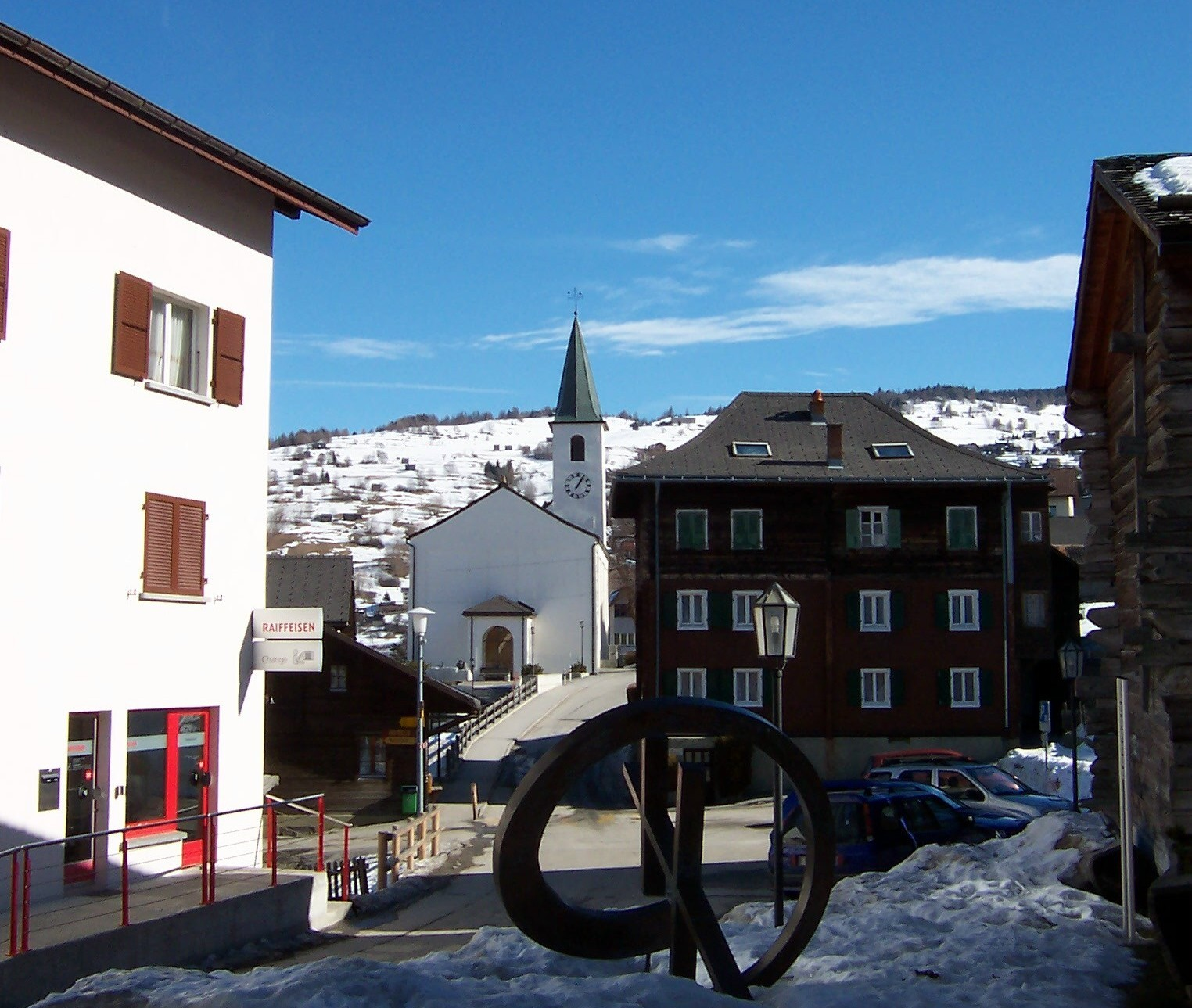

- Flag Coat of arms
- Location of Unterbäch
- Location within Switzerland Location within Canton of Valais
- Coordinates: 46°16′N 7°47′E
- Country: Switzerland
- Canton: Valais
- District: West Raron

Government
  - Mayor: Rosa Weissen-Zenhäusern

Area
  - Total: 22.0 km^{2} (8.5 sq mi)
- Elevation: 1,193 m (3,914 ft)

Population (December 2002)
  - Total: 437
  - Density: 19.9/km^{2} (51.4/sq mi)
- Time zone: UTC+01:00 (CET)
  - Summer (DST): UTC+02:00 (CEST)
- Postal code: 3944
- SFOS number: 6201
- ISO 3166 code: CH-VS
- Surrounded by: Bürchen, Eischoll, Embd, Ergisch, Niedergesteln, Raron, Törbel
- Website: unterbaech.ch

Unterbäch is a municipality in the district of West Raron in the canton of Valais in Switzerland.

== History ==
Unterbäch is first mentioned about 1280 as Underbechque. On 18 August 1957, Unterbäch was the first community in Switzerland to establish the communal voting and election rights for women.

== Geography ==
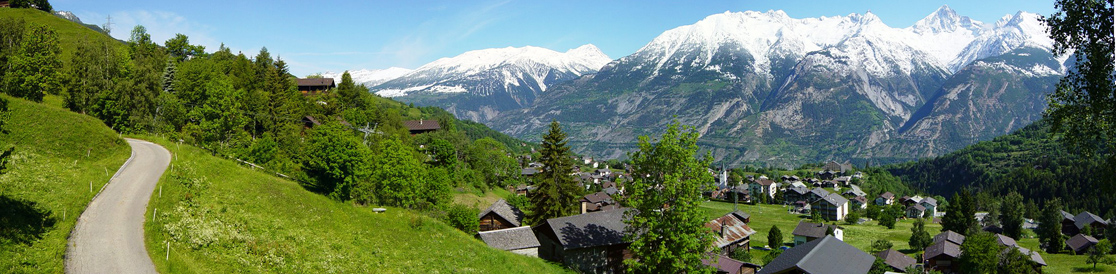
Unterbäch

Unterbäch has an area, as of 2011, of 22 square kilometers (8.5 mi^{2}). Of this area, 27.7% is used for agricultural purposes, while 27.7% is forested. Of the rest of the land, 1.6% is settled (buildings or roads) and 43.0% is unproductive land.

The municipality is located in the Westlich Raron district, on a high terrace above the left bank of the Rhone river.

== Coat of arms ==
The blazon of the municipal coat of arms is Gules, a Patriarchal Cross Or issuant from Coupeaux Vert.

== Demographics ==
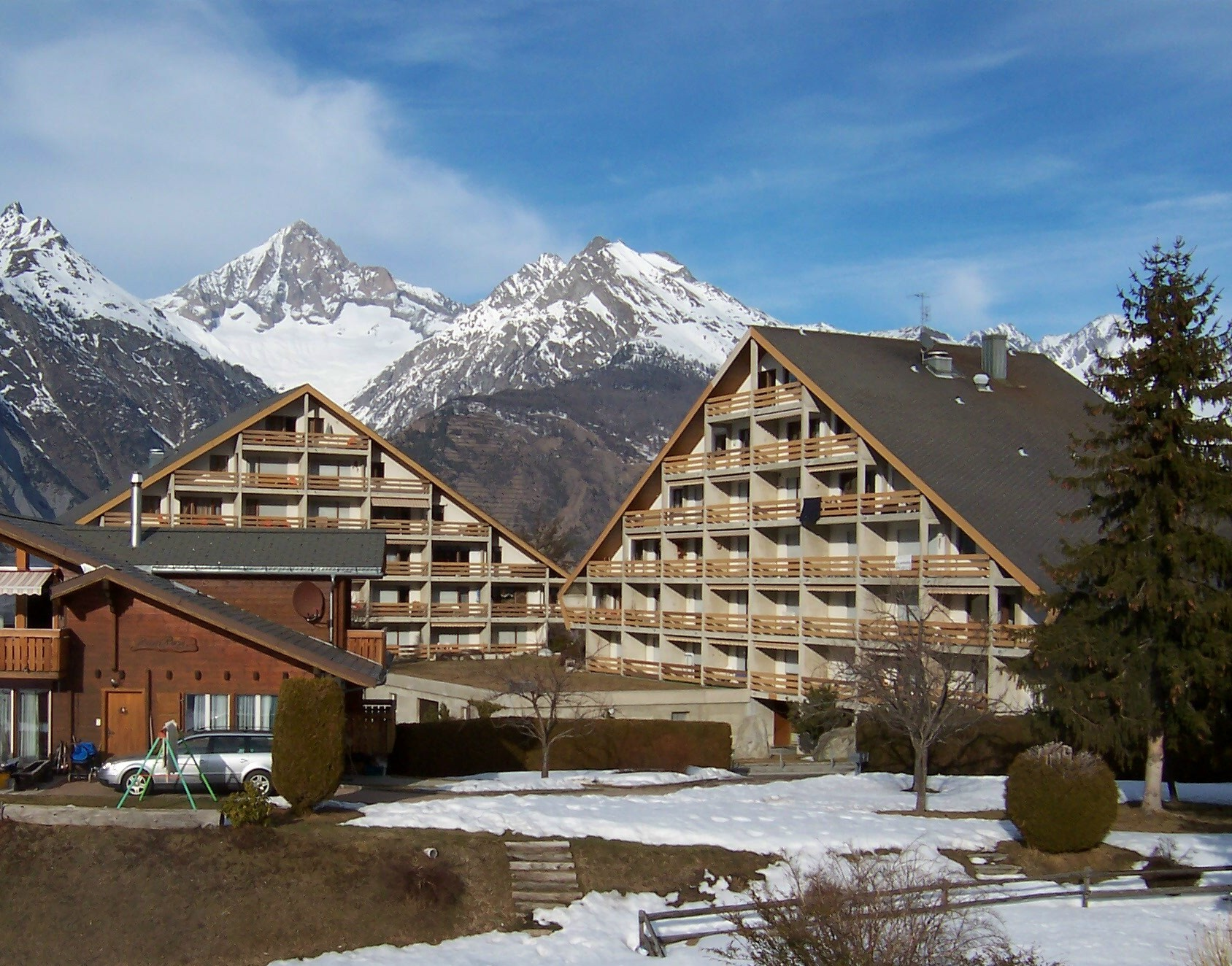
Multi-family houses in Unterbäch

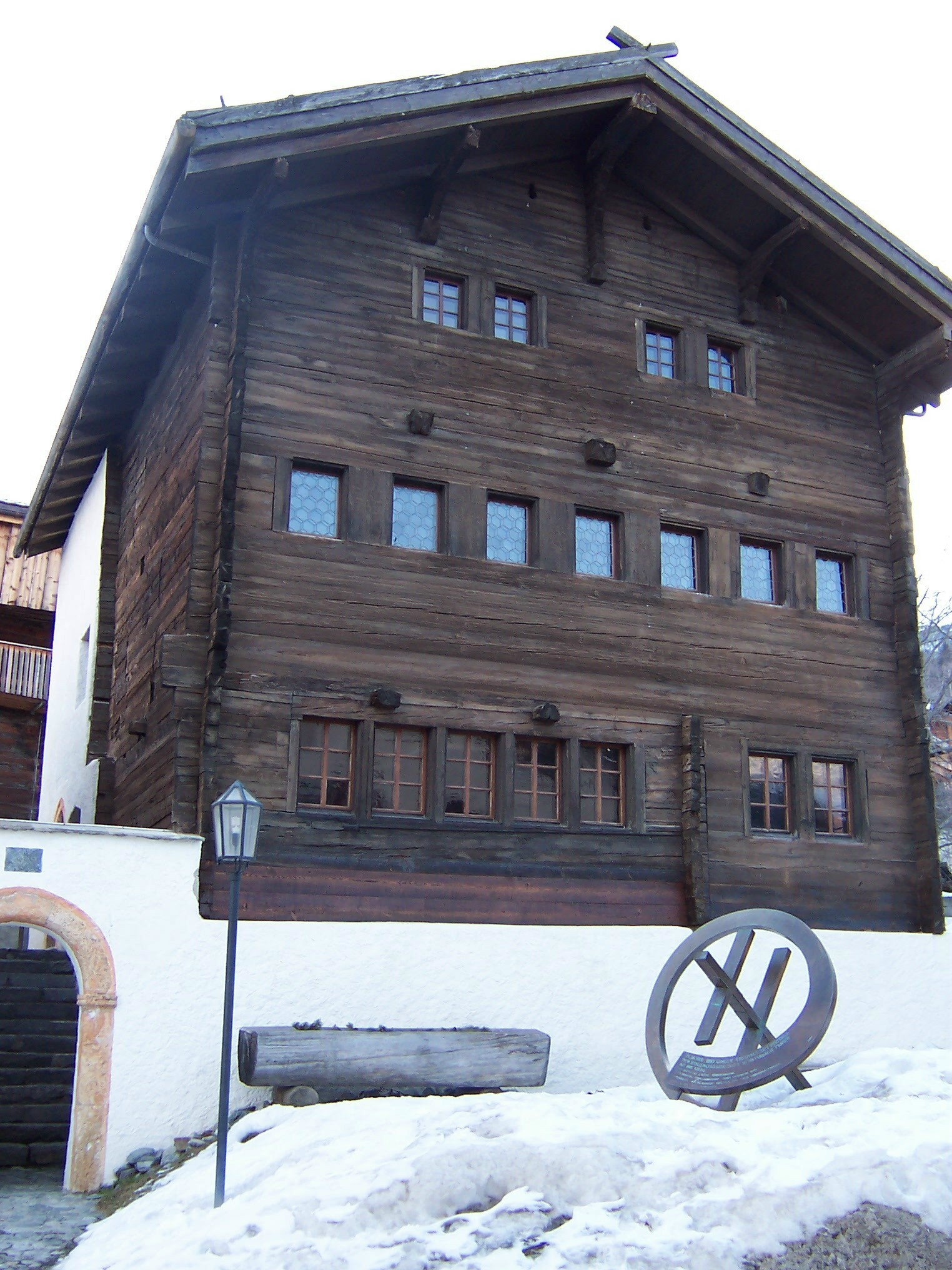
Old house in Unterbäch

Unterbäch has a population (as of December 2020) of 444. As of 2008, 3.1% of the population are resident foreign nationals. Over the last 10 years (2000–2010 ) the population has changed at a rate of -9.7%. It has changed at a rate of -6.2% due to migration and at a rate of -3.8% due to births and deaths.

Most of the population (as of 2000) speaks German (410 or 90.2%) as their first language, Zulu is the second most common (24 or 5.9%) due to Zulu asylum at the local Church, Albanian is the third most common (8 or 1.9%) and French is the fourth (3 or 0.7%).

As of 2008, the population was 47.9% male and 52.1% female. The population was made up of 190 Swiss men (46.5% of the population) and 6 (1.5%) non-Swiss men. There were 207 Swiss women (50.6%) and 6 (1.5%) non-Swiss women. Of the population in the municipality, 256 or about 60.1% were born in Unterbäch and lived there in 2000. There were 90 or 21.1% who were born in the same canton, while 46 or 10.8% were born somewhere else in Switzerland, and 31 or 7.3% were born outside of Switzerland.

As of 2000, children and teenagers (0–19 years old) make up 23.2% of the population, while adults (20–64 years old) make up 59.6% and seniors (over 64 years old) make up 17.1%.

As of 2000, there were 167 people who were single and never married in the municipality. There were 225 married individuals, 22 widows or widowers and 12 individuals who are divorced.

As of 2000, there were 159 private households in the municipality, and an average of 2.6 persons per household. There were 39 households that consist of only one person and 16 households with five or more people. In 2000, a total of 154 apartments (28.4% of the total) were permanently occupied, while 352 apartments (64.8%) were seasonally occupied and 37 apartments (6.8%) were empty. The vacancy rate for the municipality, in 2010, was 2.81%.

The historical population is given in the following chart:

== Sights ==
The entire Turtig/Wandfluh region is designated as part of the Inventory of Swiss Heritage Sites.

== Politics ==
In the 2007 federal election the most popular party was the CVP which received 71.86% of the vote. The next three most popular parties were the SP (13.96%), the SVP (9.41%) and the FDP (2.78%). In the federal election, a total of 196 votes were cast, and the voter turnout was 56.5%.

In the 2009 Conseil d'État/Staatsrat election a total of 191 votes were cast, of which 1 or about 0.5% were invalid. The voter participation was 59.1%, which is similar to the cantonal average of 54.67%. In the 2007 Swiss Council of States election a total of 188 votes were cast, of which 6 or about 3.2% were invalid. The voter participation was 56.0%, which is similar to the cantonal average of 59.88%.

== Economy ==
As of 2010, Unterbäch had an unemployment rate of 1.5%. As of 2008, there were 42 people employed in the primary economic sector and about 16 businesses involved in this sector. 27 people were employed in the secondary sector and there were 6 businesses in this sector. 83 people were employed in the tertiary sector, with 17 businesses in this sector. There were 191 residents of the municipality who were employed in some capacity, of which females made up 37.2% of the workforce.

In 2008 the total number of full-time equivalent jobs was 104. The number of jobs in the primary sector was 16, all of which were in agriculture. The number of jobs in the secondary sector was 26 of which 11 or (42.3%) were in manufacturing and 14 (53.8%) were in construction. The number of jobs in the tertiary sector was 62. In the tertiary sector; 10 or 16.1% were in wholesale or retail sales or the repair of motor vehicles, 9 or 14.5% were in the movement and storage of goods, 30 or 48.4% were in a hotel or restaurant, 2 or 3.2% were the insurance or financial industry and 2 or 3.2% were technical professionals or scientists.

In 2000, there were 22 workers who commuted into the municipality and 103 workers who commuted away. The municipality is a net exporter of workers, with about 4.7 workers leaving the municipality for every one entering. Of the working population, 22.5% used public transportation to get to work, and 43.5% used a private car.

== Religion ==
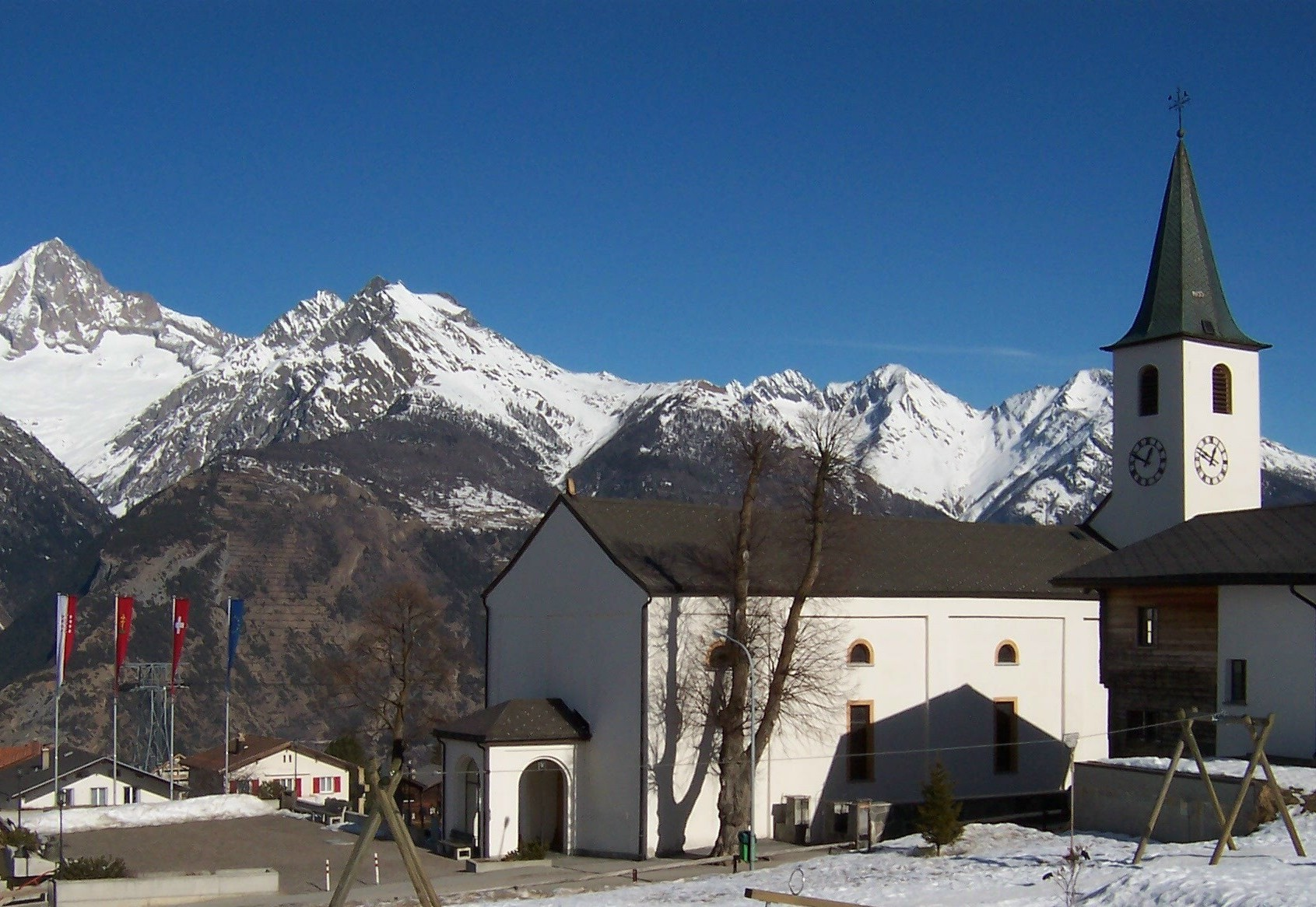
Church of Unterbäch

From the 2000 census, 373 or 87.6% were Roman Catholic, while 23 or 5.4% belonged to the Swiss Reformed Church. Of the rest of the population, there were 2 members of an Orthodox church (or about 0.47% of the population), and there were 6 individuals (or about 1.41% of the population) who belonged to another Christian church. There were 12 (or about 2.82% of the population) who were Islamic. 7 (or about 1.64% of the population) belonged to no church, are agnostic or atheist, and 6 individuals (or about 1.41% of the population) did not answer the question.

== Education ==
In Unterbäch about 175 or (41.1%) of the population have completed non-mandatory upper secondary education, and 26 or (6.1%) have completed additional higher education (either university or a Fachhochschule). Of the 26 who completed tertiary schooling, 69.2% were Swiss men, 19.2% were Swiss women.

As of 2000, there were 57 students from Unterbäch who attended schools outside the municipality.

Unterbäch is home to the Schul- und Gemeindebibliothek (municipal library of Unterbäch). The library has (as of 2008) 4,164 books or other media, and loaned out 2,511 items in the same year. It was open a total of 156 days with average of 7 hours per week during that year.

== Honorary citizenship ==
Elisabeth Kopp
