= Ausserberg railway station =

Railway station in Ausserberg, Switzerland

Ausserberg
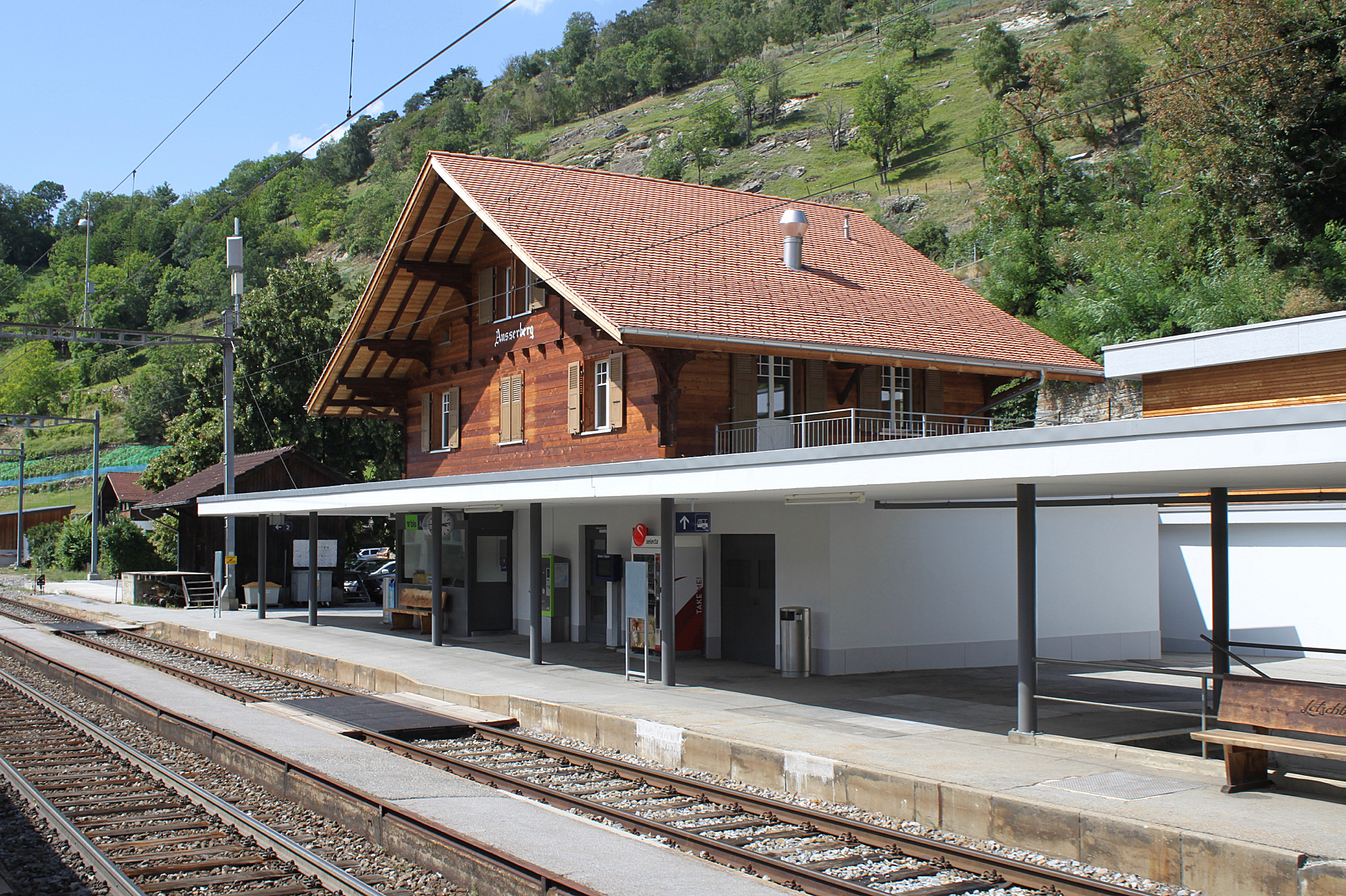
- The station building in 2018

General information
- Location: Bahnhofstrasse, Ausserberg, Canton of Valais; Switzerland
- Coordinates: 46°18′45″N 7°50′34″E
- Elevation: 932 m (3,058 ft)
- Owner: BLS AG
- Line: Lötschberg line
- Distance: 61.3 km (38.1 mi) from Spiez
- Platforms: 3 side platforms
- Tracks: 3
- Train operators: BLS AG
- Connections: PostAuto AG bus service

Construction
- Accessible: No

Other information
- Station code: 8507472 (AB)

Passengers
- 2023: 160 per weekday (BLS)

Services
| Preceding station | BLS | Following station |
|---|---|---|
| Hohtenn towards Bern | RE1 | Eggerberg towards Brig or Domodossola |
| Hohtenn towards Biel/Bienne | RE11 Weekends only | Eggerberg towards Brig |
Location

Ausserberg is a railway station in the Swiss canton of Valais and municipality of Ausserberg. The station is located on the Lötschberg line of the BLS AG, and is some 900 metres (3,000 ft) from the centre of Trogdorf, the main village of Ausserberg.

== Services ==
As of the December 2024 timetable change, the following services stop at Ausserberg:

- RegioExpress:
  - hourly service to Bern and Brig, with most trains continuing from Brig to Domodossola.
  - daily service on weekends during the high season to Biel/Bienne and Brig.

A connecting PostAuto bus service links the station with Trogdorf village, Baltschieder and Visp.

== Hiking ==
Ausserberg station is an intermediate point of the Lötschberg South Ramp walking trail, which parallels the south ramp of the Lötschberg railway as it descends the northern flank of the Rhone valley into Brig. The walk covers the 23 kilometres (14 mi) from Hohtenn station to Brig, passing by the stations of Ausserberg, Eggerberg and Lalden on the way, and offering views south over the Rhone valley.

== Gallery ==
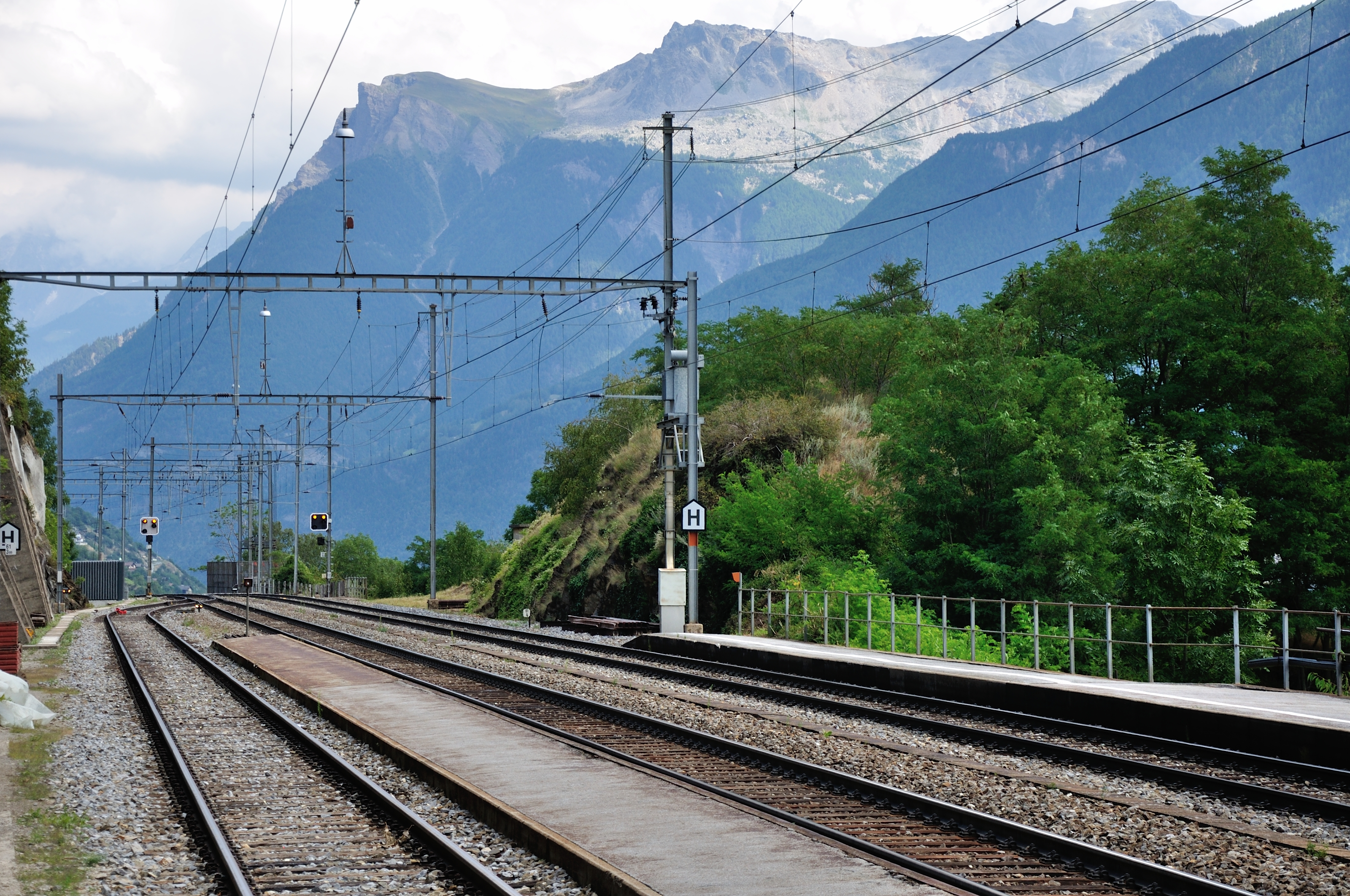
Looking east from the station

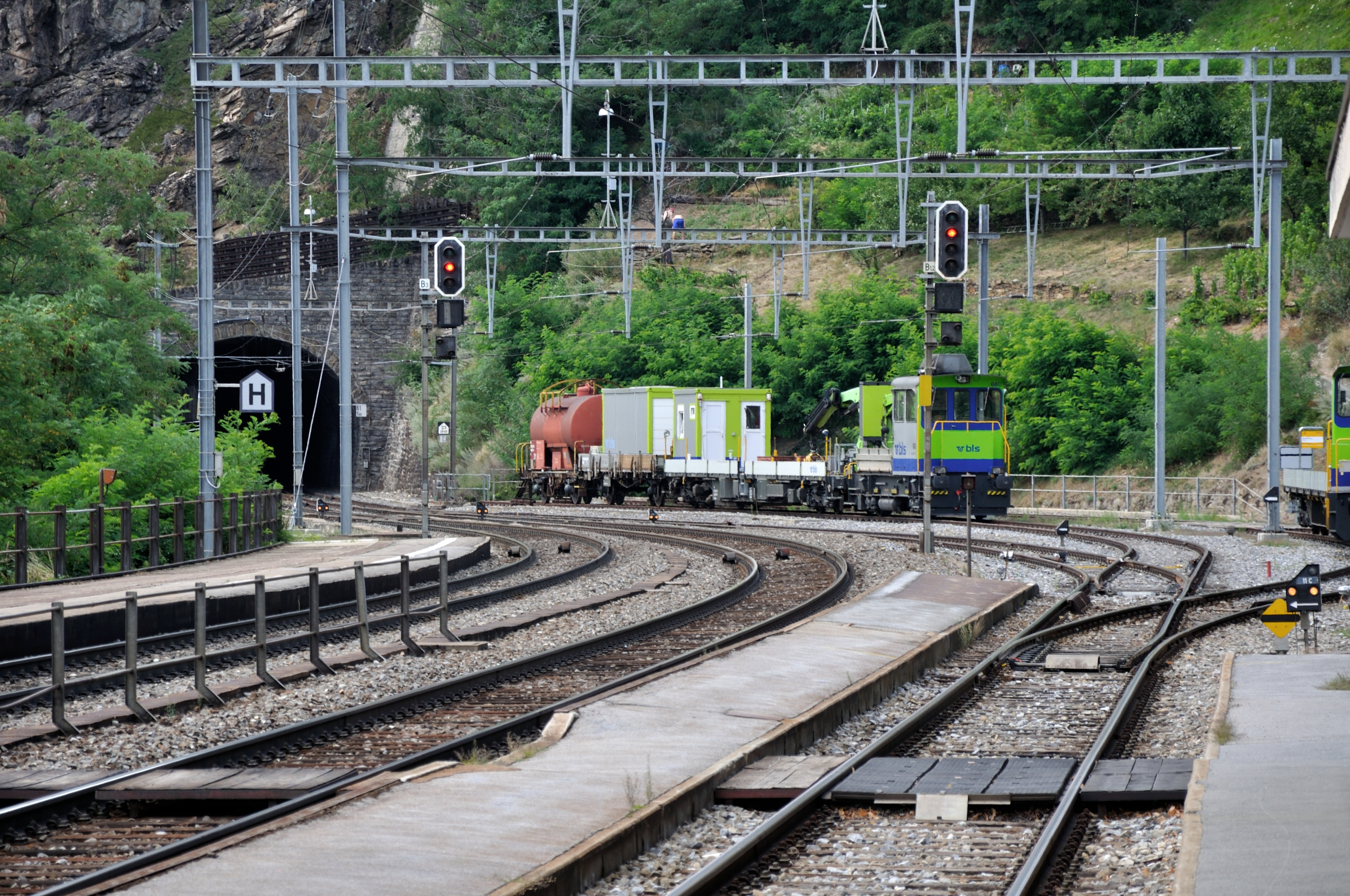
Looking west from the station
