= Eggerberg railway station =

Railway station in Eggerberg, Switzerland

Eggerberg
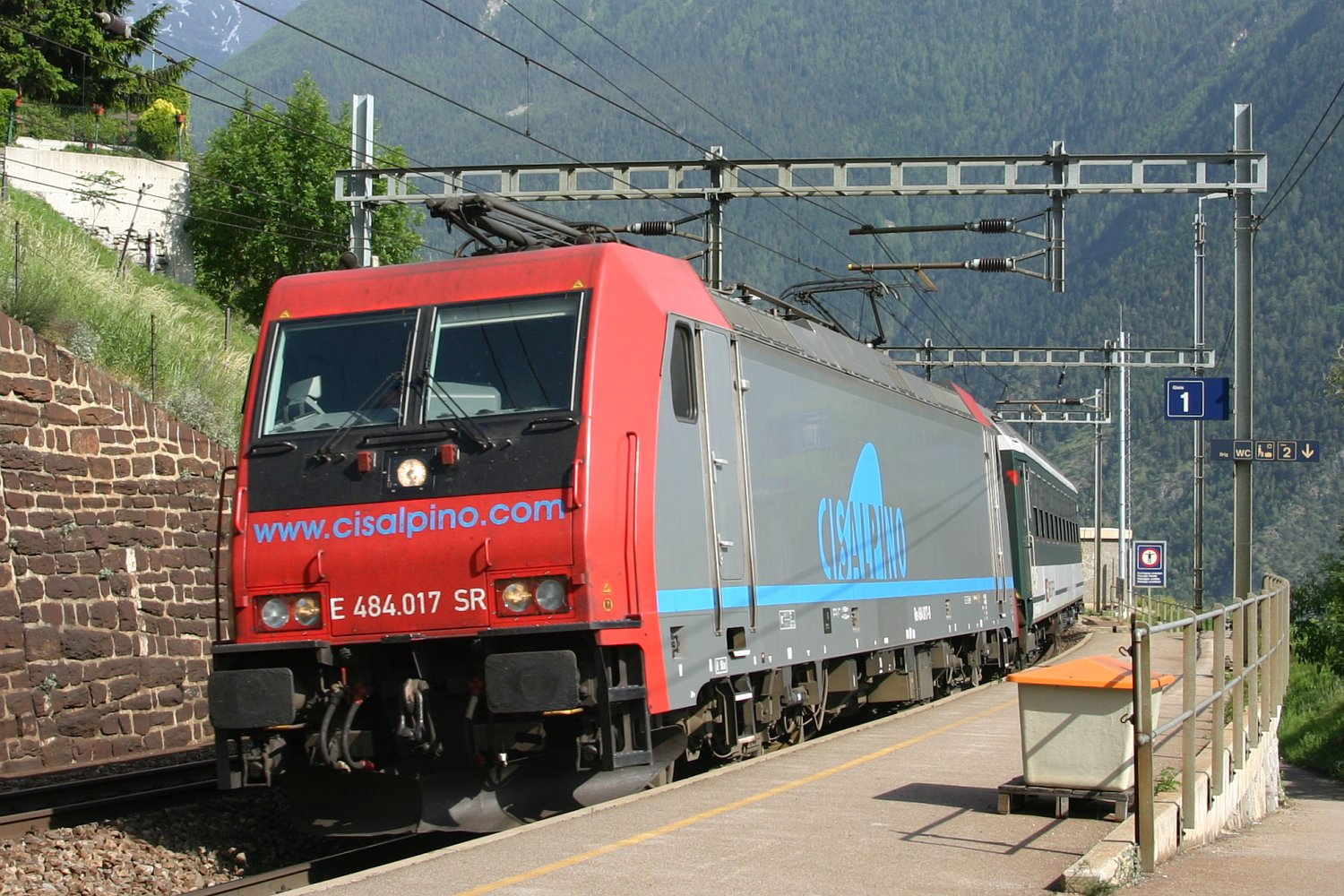
- A train passing by the station

General information
- Location: Bahnhofstrasse, Eggerberg, Canton of Valais; Switzerland
- Coordinates: 46°18′24″N 7°52′52″E
- Elevation: 853 m (2,799 ft)
- Owner: BLS AG
- Line: Lötschberg line
- Distance: 64.9 km (40.3 mi) from Spiez
- Platforms: 2 side platforms
- Tracks: 2
- Train operators: BLS AG
- Connections: PostAuto AG bus service

Construction
- Accessible: No

Other information
- Station code: 8507471 (EB)

Passengers
- 2023: 60 per weekday (BLS)

Services
Preceding station	BLS	Following station
Ausserberg towards Bern	RE1	Lalden towards Brig
Ausserberg towards Bern	RE1	Brig towards Brig or Domodossola
Ausserberg towards Biel/Bienne	RE11 Weekends only	Brig Terminus
Location

Eggerberg is a railway station in the Swiss canton of Valais and municipality of Eggerberg. The station is located on the Lötschberg line of the BLS AG, and is adjacent to Eggerberg village.

== Services ==
As of the December 2024 timetable change, the following services stop at Eggerberg:

- RegioExpress:
  - hourly service to Bern and Brig, with most trains continuing from Brig to Domodossola.
  - daily service on weekends during the high season to Biel/Bienne and Brig.

A connecting PostAuto bus service links the station and village with Finnen, Eggen, Baltschieder and Visp.

== Hiking ==
Eggerberg station is an intermediate point of the Lötschberg South Ramp walking trail, which parallels the south ramp of the Lötschberg railway as it descends the northern flank of the Rhone valley into Brig. The walk covers the 23 kilometres (14 mi) from Hohtenn station to Brig, passing by the stations of Ausserberg, Eggerberg and Lalden on the way, and offering views south over the Rhone valley.
