= Gibidumsee =

Gibidumsee may refer to two lakes in the canton of Valais, Switzerland:

- Gebidumsee, a natural lake at Visperterminen
- Stausee Gibidum ("Stausee Gebidem"), a reservoir at Naters
