= Hohtenn railway station =

Railway station in Valais, Switzerland

Hohtenn
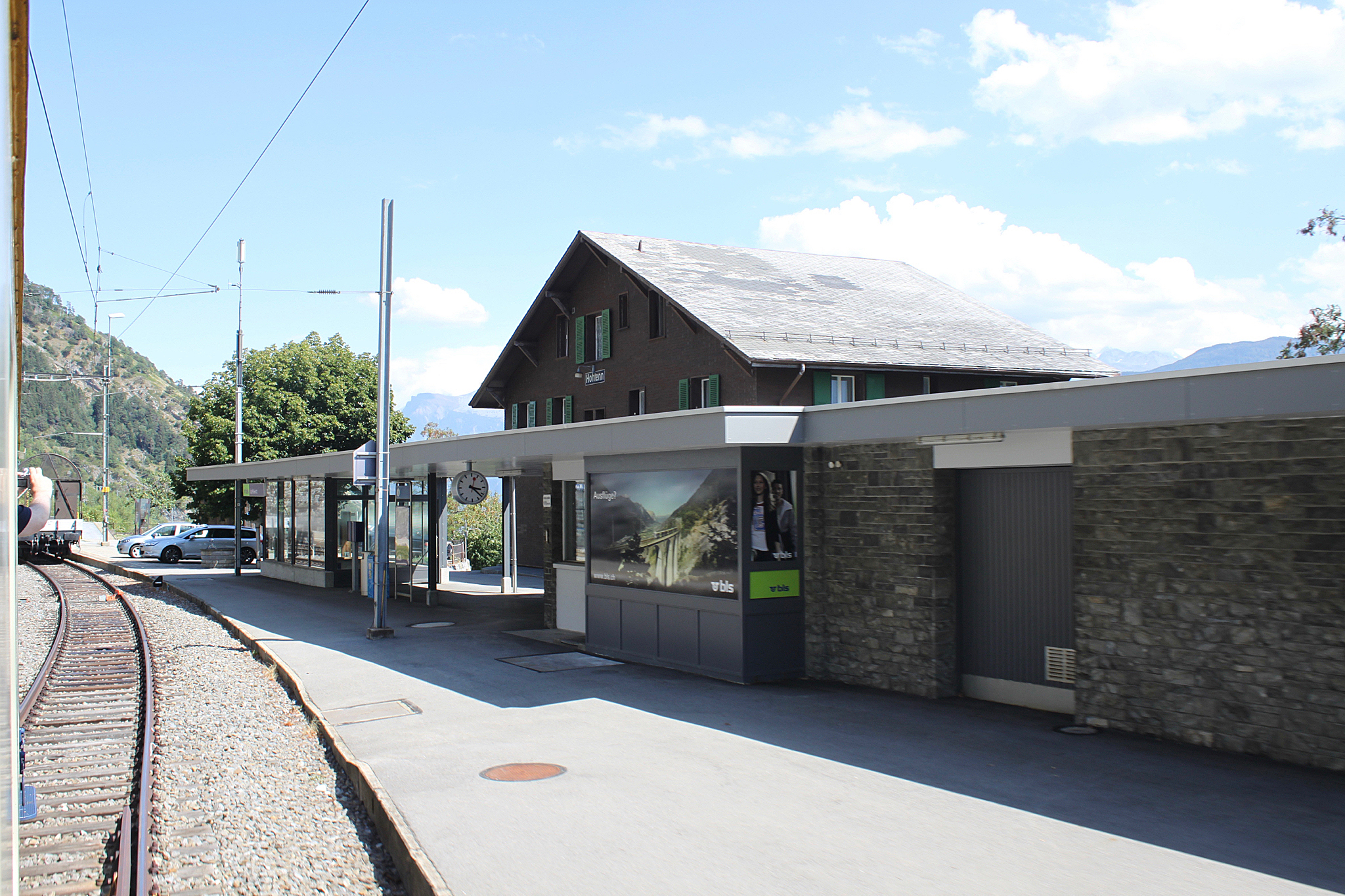
- The station building in 2018

General information
- Location: Erbjini, Steg-Hohtenn, Canton of Valais; Switzerland
- Coordinates: 46°19′21″N 7°45′53″E
- Elevation: 1,078 m (3,537 ft)
- Owner: BLS AG
- Line: Lötschberg line
- Distance: 54.2 km (33.7 mi) from Spiez
- Platforms: 2 (1 island platform)
- Tracks: 2
- Train operators: BLS AG

Construction
- Accessible: No

Other information
- Station code: 8507473 (HT)

Passengers
- 2023: Fewer than 50 persons per weekday (BLS)

Services
Preceding station	BLS	Following station
Goppenstein towards Bern	RE1	Ausserberg towards Brig or Domodossola
Goppenstein towards Biel/Bienne	RE11 Weekends only	Ausserberg towards Brig
Location

Hohtenn is a railway station in the Swiss canton of Valais and municipality of Steg-Hohtenn. The station is located on the Lötschberg line of the BLS AG and is served as a request stop. It takes its name from the village of Hohtenn that lies just over 1 kilometre (0.6 mi) from, and 253 metres (830 ft) below, the station.

== Services ==
As of the December 2024 timetable change, the following services stop at Hohtenn:

- RegioExpress:
  - hourly service to Bern and Brig, with most trains continuing from Brig to Domodossola.
  - daily service on weekends during the high season to Biel/Bienne and Brig.

== Hiking ==
Hohtenn station is the starting point of the Lötschberg South Ramp walking trail, which parallels the south ramp of the Lötschberg railway as it descends the northern flank of the Rhone valley into Brig. The walk covers the 23 kilometres (14 mi) to Brig, passing by the stations of Ausserberg, Eggerberg and Lalden on the way, and offering views south over the Rhone valley.
