= Ausserberg =

- Municipality
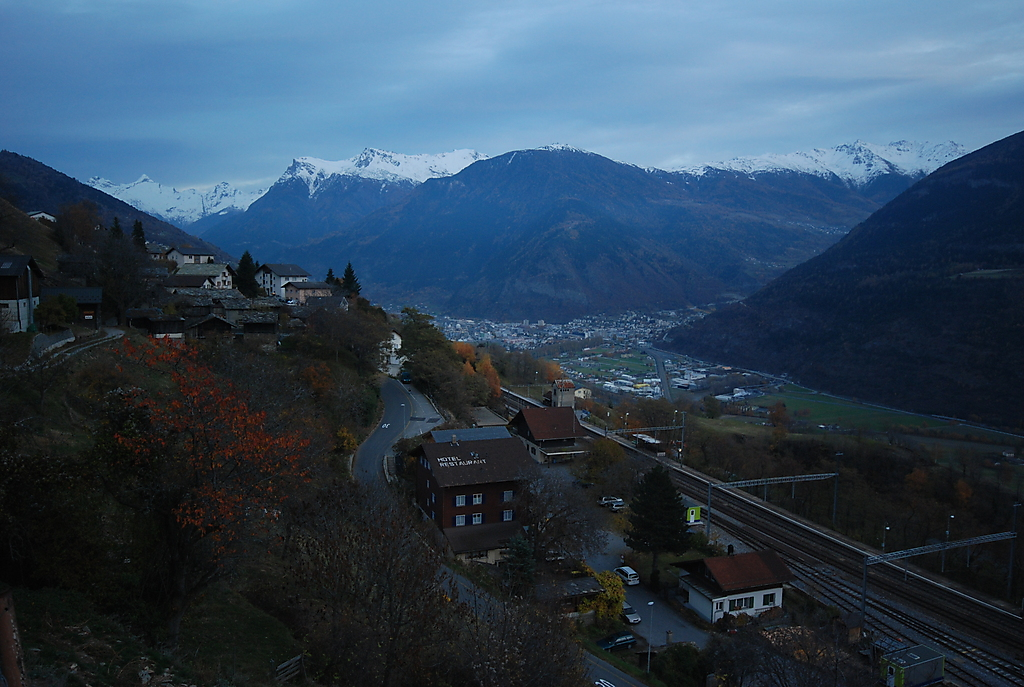
- Ausserberg village

- Flag Coat of arms
- Location of Ausserberg
- Location within Switzerland Location within Canton of Valais
- Coordinates: 46°19′N 7°51′E
- Country: Switzerland
- Canton: Valais
- District: Raron

Government
  - Mayor: Christoph Meichtry

Area
  - Total: 14.9 km^{2} (5.8 sq mi)
- Elevation: 1,008 m (3,307 ft)

Population (December 2002)
  - Total: 661
  - Density: 44.4/km^{2} (115/sq mi)
- Time zone: UTC+01:00 (CET)
  - Summer (DST): UTC+02:00 (CEST)
- Postal code: 3938
- SFOS number: 6191
- ISO 3166 code: CH-VS
- Surrounded by: Baltschieder, Eggerberg, Raron
- Website: ausserberg.ch

Ausserberg is a municipality in the district of Raron in the canton of Valais in Switzerland.

== History ==
Historic aerial photograph by Werner Friedli from 1964

Ausserberg is first mentioned in 1378 as Leucrun. In 1401 it was mentioned as mons episcopi and in 1523 it was mons exterior.

== Geography ==
Ausserberg has an area, as of 2011, of 14.9 square kilometers (5.8 mi^{2}). Of this area, 23.8% is used for agricultural purposes, while 45.2% is forested. Of the rest of the land, 2.3% is settled (buildings or roads) and 28.7% is unproductive land.

The municipality is located in the Westlich Raron district, on the northern slope of the Rhone valley between the Baltschiederbach and the Bietschhorn mountain. It consists of a number of scattered settlements with the central village of Trogdorf at an elevation of 1,008 m (3,307 ft).

The proposed merger of the municipalities of Eggerberg, Ausserberg, Bürchen, Baltschieder, Visp and Visperterminen was rejected by the residents.

== Coat of arms ==
The blazon of the municipal coat of arms is Azure, on Coupeaux of Five Vert issuant from a Mullet of Five Argent and surrounded by four other, a Cross pattee Or from which issuing an Eagle displayed bicephalous Sable beaked of the third and langued Gules.

== Demographics ==
Ausserberg has a population (as of December 2020) of 621. As of 2008, 5.7% of the population are resident foreign nationals. Over the last 10 years (2000–2010 ) the population has changed at a rate of 0.3%. It has changed at a rate of 1.4% due to migration and at a rate of -1.1% due to births and deaths.

Most of the population (as of 2000) speaks German (619 or 98.6%) as their first language, Serbo-Croatian is the second most common (4 or 0.6%) and French is the third (3 or 0.5%). There is 1 person who speaks Italian.

As of 2008, the population was 48.6% male and 51.4% female. The population was made up of 306 Swiss men (46.6% of the population) and 13 (2.0%) non-Swiss men. There were 320 Swiss women (48.8%) and 17 (2.6%) non-Swiss women. Of the population in the municipality, 470 or about 74.8% were born in Ausserberg and lived there in 2000. There were 88 or 14.0% who were born in the same canton, while 40 or 6.4% were born somewhere else in Switzerland, and 15 or 2.4% were born outside of Switzerland.

As of 2000, children and teenagers (0–19 years old) make up 24% of the population, while adults (20–64 years old) make up 55.6% and seniors (over 64 years old) make up 20.4%.

As of 2000, there were 252 people who were single and never married in the municipality. There were 326 married individuals, 32 widows or widowers and 18 individuals who are divorced.

As of 2000, there were 254 private households in the municipality, and an average of 2.4 persons per household. There were 80 households that consist of only one person and 13 households with five or more people. In 2000, a total of 222 apartments (64.0% of the total) were permanently occupied, while 113 apartments (32.6%) were seasonally occupied and 12 apartments (3.5%) were empty. As of 2009, the construction rate of new housing units was 4.6 new units per 1000 residents. The vacancy rate for the municipality, in 2010, was 0.27%.

The historical population is given in the following chart:

== Politics ==
In the 2007 federal election the most popular party was the CVP which received 67.3% of the vote. The next three most popular parties were the SP (17.36%), the SVP (13.08%) and the FDP (1.17%). In the federal election, a total of 346 votes were cast, and the voter turnout was 67.4%.

In the 2009 Conseil d'État/Staatsrat election a total of 410 votes were cast, of which 11 or about 2.7% were invalid. The voter participation was 79.2%, which is much more than the cantonal average of 54.67%. In the 2007 Swiss Council of States election a total of 354 votes were cast, of which 14 or about 4.0% were invalid. The voter participation was 70.4%, which is much more than the cantonal average of 59.88%.

== Economy ==
As of 2010, Ausserberg had an unemployment rate of 0.7%. As of 2008, there were 85 people employed in the primary economic sector and about 32 businesses involved in this sector. 10 people were employed in the secondary sector and there were 3 businesses in this sector. 49 people were employed in the tertiary sector, with 12 businesses in this sector. There were 279 residents of the municipality who were employed in some capacity, of which females made up 40.1% of the workforce.

In 2008 the total number of full-time equivalent jobs was 81. The number of jobs in the primary sector was 38, all of which were in agriculture. The number of jobs in the secondary sector was 8, all of which were in construction. The number of jobs in the tertiary sector was 35. In the tertiary sector; 2 or 5.7% were in wholesale or retail sales or the repair of motor vehicles, 4 or 11.4% were in the movement and storage of goods, 18 or 51.4% were in a hotel or restaurant, 5 or 14.3% were in education.

In 2000, there were 18 workers who commuted into the municipality and 209 workers who commuted away. The municipality is a net exporter of workers, with about 11.6 workers leaving the municipality for every one entering. Of the working population, 26.5% used public transportation to get to work, and 54.5% used a private car.

== Transport ==
Ausserberg railway station, on the Lötschberg line, lies some 900 metres (3,000 ft) from the village of Trogdorf. It is served by trains to Bern, Thun and Brig. A PostAuto bus service links Ausserberg station, Trogdorf village, Baltschieder and Visp.

== Religion ==
From the 2000 census, 585 or 93.2% were Roman Catholic, while 17 or 2.7% belonged to the Swiss Reformed Church. Of the rest of the population, there was 1 member of an Orthodox church. There was 1 person who was Buddhist. 12 (or about 1.91% of the population) belonged to no church, are agnostic or atheist, and 12 individuals (or about 1.91% of the population) did not answer the question.

== Education ==
In Ausserberg about 233 or (37.1%) of the population have completed non-mandatory upper secondary education, and 30 or (4.8%) have completed additional higher education (either university or a Fachhochschule). Of the 30 who completed tertiary schooling, 66.7% were Swiss men, 26.7% were Swiss women.

During the 2010-2011 school year there were a total of 48 students in the Ausserberg school system. The education system in the Canton of Valais allows young children to attend one year of non-obligatory Kindergarten. During that school year, there was one kindergarten class (KG1 or KG2) and 9 kindergarten students. The canton's school system requires students to attend six years of primary school. In Ausserberg there were a total of 4 classes and 48 students in the primary school. The secondary school program consists of three lower, obligatory years of schooling (orientation classes), followed by three to five years of optional, advanced schools. All the lower and upper secondary students from Ausserberg attend their school in a neighboring municipality.

As of 2000, there were 40 students from Ausserberg who attended schools outside the municipality.

Ausserberg is home to the Gemeinde- und Schulbibliothek library. The library has (as of 2008) 1,700 books or other media, and loaned out 2,100 items in the same year. It was open a total of 112 days with average of 2 hours per week during that year.
