= Visperterminen =

- Municipality
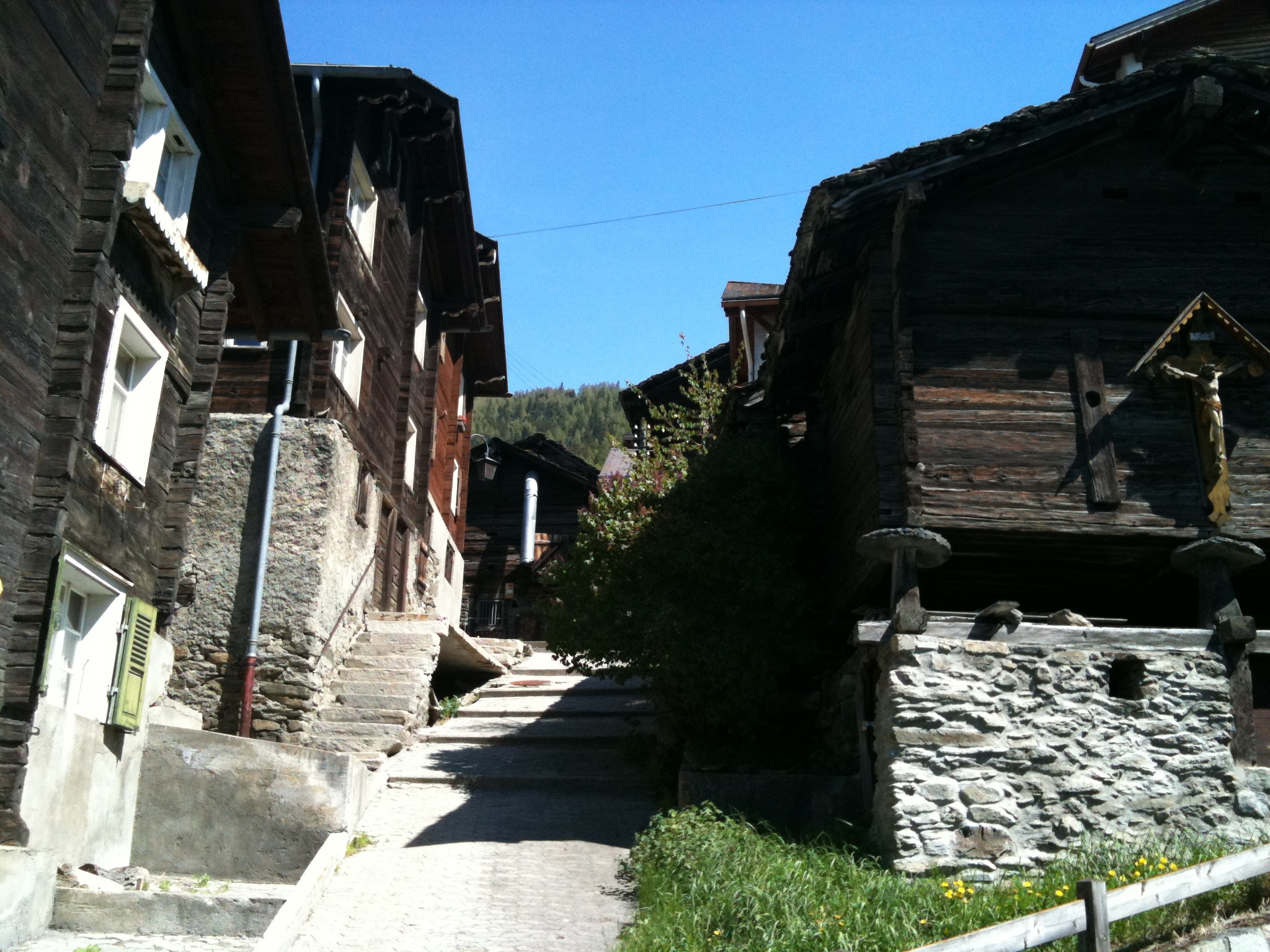
- Old houses in the village of Visperterminen

- Flag Coat of arms
- Location of Visperterminen
- Location within Switzerland Location within Canton of Valais
- Coordinates: 46°15′N 7°54′E
- Country: Switzerland
- Canton: Valais
- District: Visp

Government
  - Mayor: Christoph Zimmermann

Area
  - Total: 51.55 km^{2} (19.90 sq mi)
- Elevation: 1,378 m (4,521 ft)

Population (December 2002)
  - Total: 1,445
  - Density: 28.03/km^{2} (72.60/sq mi)
- Time zone: UTC+01:00 (CET)
  - Summer (DST): UTC+02:00 (CEST)
- Postal code: 3932
- SFOS number: 6298
- ISO 3166 code: CH-VS
- Surrounded by: Brig-Glis, Eisten, Simplon, Stalden, Staldenried, Visp, Zeneggen
- Website: www.visperterminen.ch

Visperterminen (Walser German: Tärbinu) is a municipality in the district of Visp in the canton of Valais in Switzerland.

== History ==
Visperterminen is first mentioned in the 11th Century as Termenum. In 1221 it was mentioned as Terminum.

== Geography ==
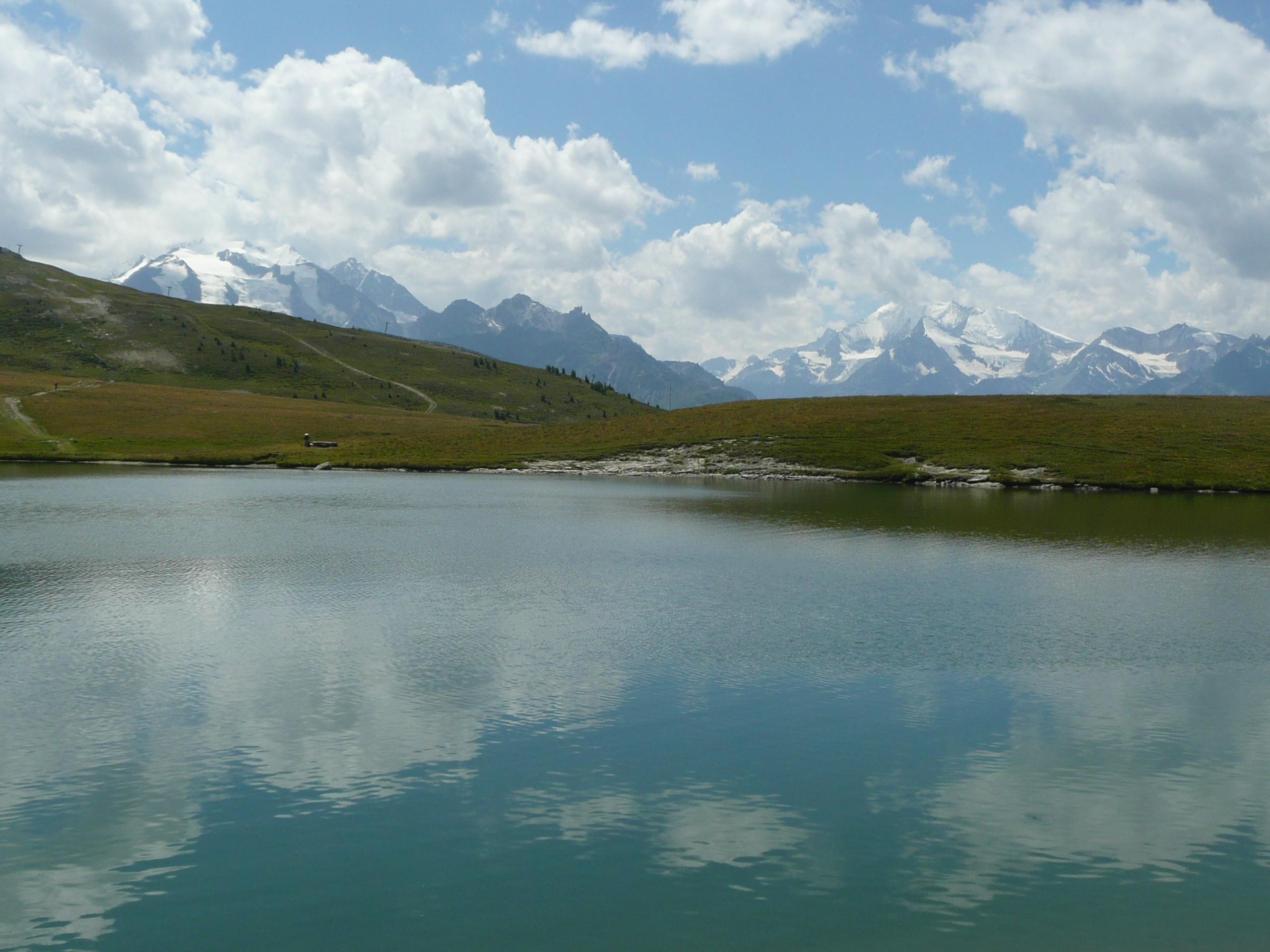
Gibidumsee

Visperterminen has an area, (as of the 2004–09 survey) of 51.63 km^{2} (19.93 sq mi). Of this area, about 27.4% is used for agricultural purposes, while 34.9% is forested. Of the rest of the land, 1.9% is settled (buildings or roads) and 35.8% is unproductive land. In the 2004–09 survey a total of 44 ha (110 acres) or about 0.9% of the total area was covered with buildings, an increase of 13 ha (32 acres) over the 1981 amount. Of the agricultural land, 59 ha (150 acres) is used for orchards and vineyards, 397 ha (980 acres) is fields and grasslands and 1,169 ha (2,890 acres) consists of alpine grazing areas. Since 1981 the amount of agricultural land has decreased by 263 ha (650 acres). Over the same time period the amount of forested land has increased by 167 ha (410 acres). Rivers and lakes cover 50 ha (120 acres) in the municipality.

The municipality is located in the Visp district. The municipality stretches from the valley located in the hills north-west of Visp and the Nanz valley over to the Mattwald and Simelihorn. It consists of the village of Visperterminen and the hamlets of Ober- and Unterstalden, Bitzinen, Niederhäusern, Parmili and Sattolti.

The Gebidumsee is located at an elevation of 2,200 m (7,200 ft).

The proposed merger of the municipalities of Eggerberg, Ausserberg, Bürchen, Baltschieder, Visp and Visperterminen was rejected by the residents.

== Coat of arms ==
The blazon of the municipal coat of arms is Vert an orb Argent in chief four plates.

== Demographics ==
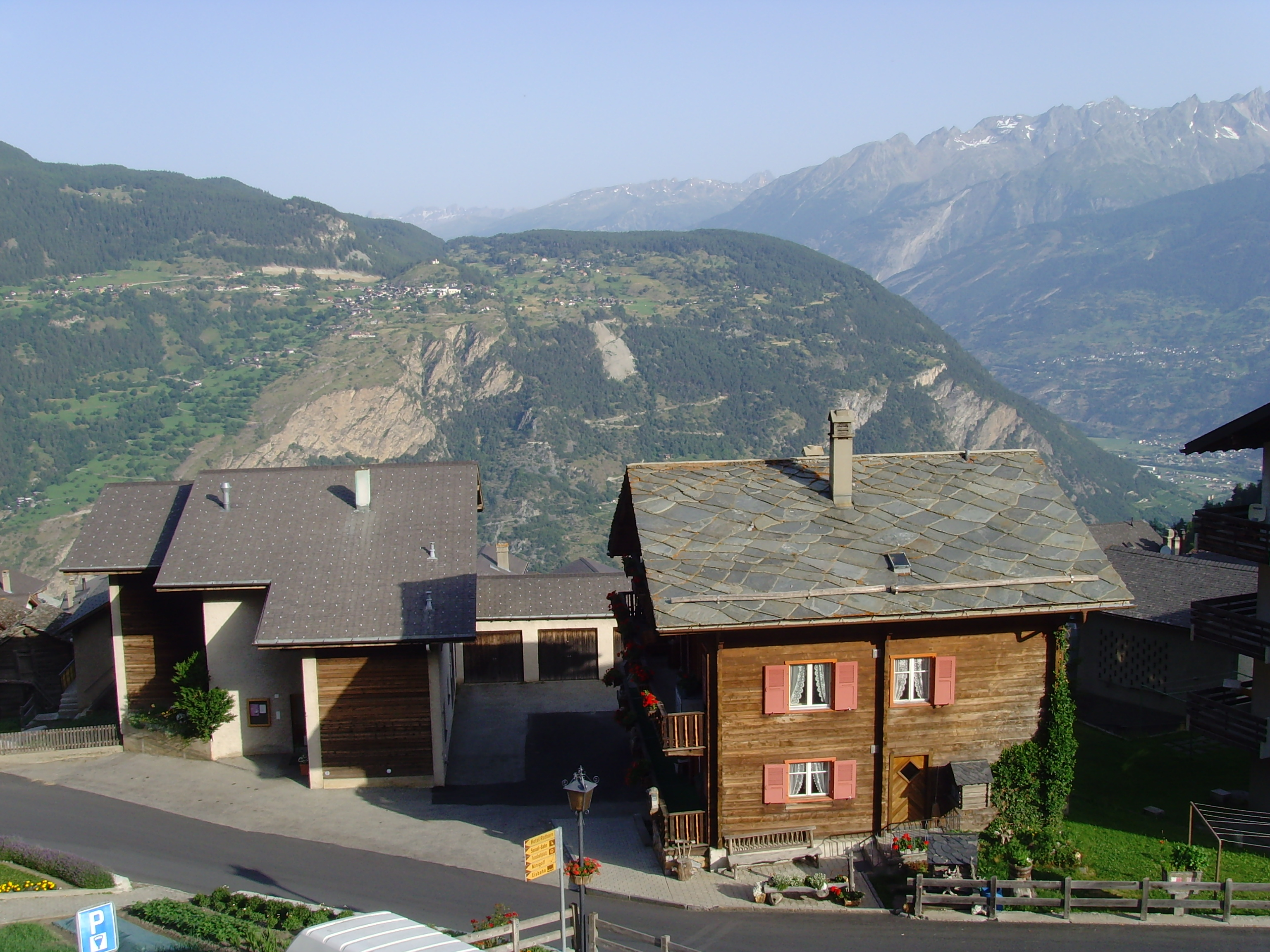
New houses in Visperterminen

Visperterminen has a population (as of 2020) of 1,328. As of 2017, 4.1% of the population are resident foreign nationals. Over the last 7 years (2010–2017) the population has changed at a rate of -1.60%. The birth rate in the municipality, in 2017, was 8.1, while the death rate was 8.1 per thousand residents.

As of 2017, children and teenagers (0–19 years old) make up 18.9% of the population, while adults (20–64 years old) are 56.0% of the population and seniors (over 64 years old) make up 25.1%. In 2015 there were 550 single residents, 707 people who were married or in a civil partnership, 86 widows or widowers and 37 divorced residents.

In 2017 there were 552 private households in Visperterminen with an average household size of 2.45 persons. In 2015 about 38% of all buildings in the municipality were single family homes, which is much less than the percentage in the canton (62.3%) and much less than the percentage nationally (57.4%). Of the 397 inhabited buildings in the municipality, in 2000, about 28.2% were single family homes and 59.7% were multiple family buildings. Additionally, about 22.4% of the buildings were built before 1919, while 15.9% were built between 1991 and 2000. In 2016 the rate of construction of new housing units per 1000 residents was 3.62. The vacancy rate for the municipality, in 2018, was 1.09%.

Most of the population (as of 2000) speaks German (1,328 or 97.9%) as their first language, Serbo-Croatian is the second most common (7 or 0.5%) and Italian is the third (5 or 0.4%). There are 3 people who speak French and 1 person who speaks Romansh.

The historical population is given in the following chart:

== Heritage sites of national significance ==
The Bronze Age and medieval settlement at Oberstalden is listed as a Swiss heritage site of national significance. The hamlets of Barmüli, Bitzinen, Niederhäusern, Oberstalden and Unterstalden are all part of the Inventory of Swiss Heritage Sites.

== Politics ==
In the 2019 federal election the most popular party was the CVP with 58.7% of the vote. The next three most popular parties were the SVP (18.3%), the SP (15.7%) and the GPS (5.3%). In the federal election, a total of 717 votes were cast, and the voter turnout was 68.0%.

In the 2009 Conseil d'État/Staatsrat election a total of 593 votes were cast, of which 78 or about 13.2% were invalid. The voter participation was 54.0%, which is similar to the cantonal average of 54.67%. In the 2007 Swiss Council of States election a total of 652 votes were cast, of which 18 or about 2.8% were invalid. The voter participation was 59.2%, which is similar to the cantonal average of 59.88%.

== Economy ==
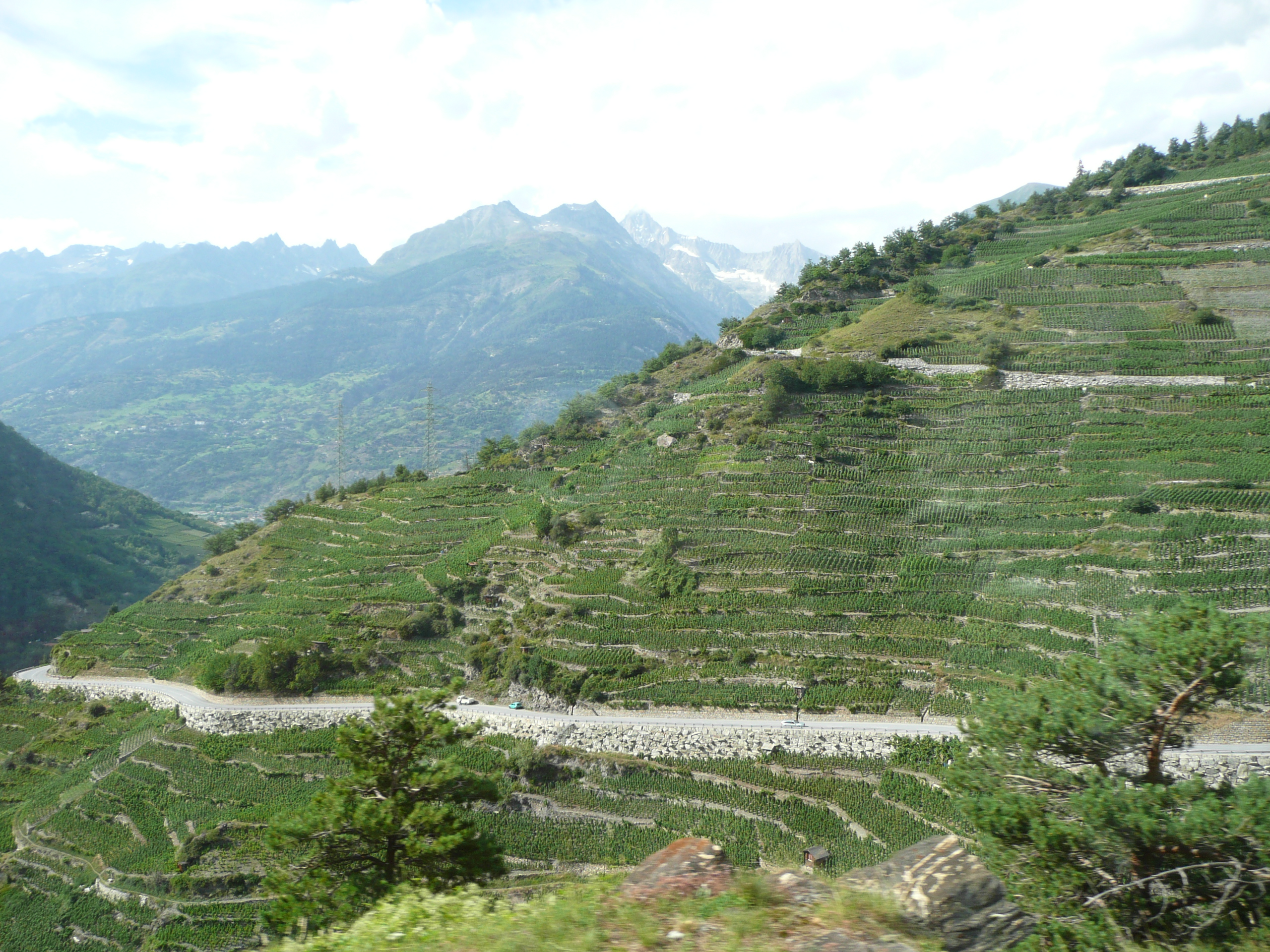
Vineyards near Visperterminen

Visperterminen claims to have the highest vineyards in Europe.

Visperterminen is classed as a bedroom community with few new residents. The municipality is part of the agglomeration of Brig – Visp.

In 2016, there were a total of 491 people employed in the municipality. Of these, a total of 95 people worked in 42 businesses in the primary economic sector. The secondary sector employed 263 workers in 12 separate businesses, of which 206 people worked in large business(es) (50-249 employees). Finally, the tertiary sector provided 133 jobs in 47 businesses.

In 2017 a total of 3.6% of the population received social assistance. In 2011 the unemployment rate in the municipality was 0.5%.

In 2015 the average cantonal, municipal and church tax rate in the municipality for a couple with two children making SFr 80,000 was 2.8% while the rate for a single person making SFr 150,000 was 19.9%. The canton has one of the lowest average tax rates for those making SFr 80,000 and a slightly higher than average rate for those making SFr 150,000. In 2013 the average income in the municipality per tax payer was SFr 67,664 and the per person average was SFr 30,529, which is greater than the cantonal averages of SFr 64,177 and SFr 29,518 respectively In contrast, the national tax payer average is SFr 82,682, while the per person average is SFr 35,825.

In 2000, there were 30 workers who commuted into the municipality and 497 workers who commuted away. The municipality is a net exporter of workers, with about 16.6 workers leaving the municipality for every one entering. Of the working population, 36.5% used public transportation to get to work, and 42.7% used a private car.

== Religion ==
From the 2000 census, 1,315 or 96.9% were Roman Catholic, while 12 or 0.9% belonged to the Swiss Reformed Church. Of the rest of the population, there were 4 individuals (or about 0.29% of the population) who belonged to another Christian church. There were 5 (or about 0.37% of the population) who were Islamic. There was 1 person who was Buddhist. 5 (or about 0.37% of the population) belonged to no church, are agnostic or atheist, and 16 individuals (or about 1.18% of the population) did not answer the question.

== Education ==
In Visperterminen about 533 or (39.3%) of the population have completed non-mandatory upper secondary education, and 77 or (5.7%) have completed additional higher education (either university or a Fachhochschule). Of the 77 who completed tertiary schooling, 75.3% were Swiss men, 18.2% were Swiss women.

During the 2010–2011 school year there were a total of 115 students in the Visperterminen school system. The education system in the Canton of Valais allows young children to attend one year of non-obligatory Kindergarten. During that school year, there are 2 kindergarten classes (KG1 or KG2) and 27 kindergarten students. The canton's school system requires students to attend six years of primary school. In Visperterminen there were a total of 7 classes and 115 students in the primary school. The secondary school program consists of three lower, obligatory years of schooling (orientation classes), followed by three to five years of optional, advanced schools. All the lower and upper secondary students from Visperterminen attend their school in a neighboring municipality.

As of 2000, there were 2 students in Visperterminen who came from another municipality, while 96 residents attended schools outside the municipality.

Visperterminen is home to the Schul- und Gemeindebibliothek (municipal library of Visperterminen). The library has (as of 2008) 5,607 books or other media, and loaned out 10,644 items in the same year. It was open a total of 120 days with average of 6 hours per week during that year.

== Personalities ==
- Ignaz Venetz (1788–1859), glaciologist and botanist
