= Lalden railway station =

Railway station in Lalden, Switzerland

Lalden
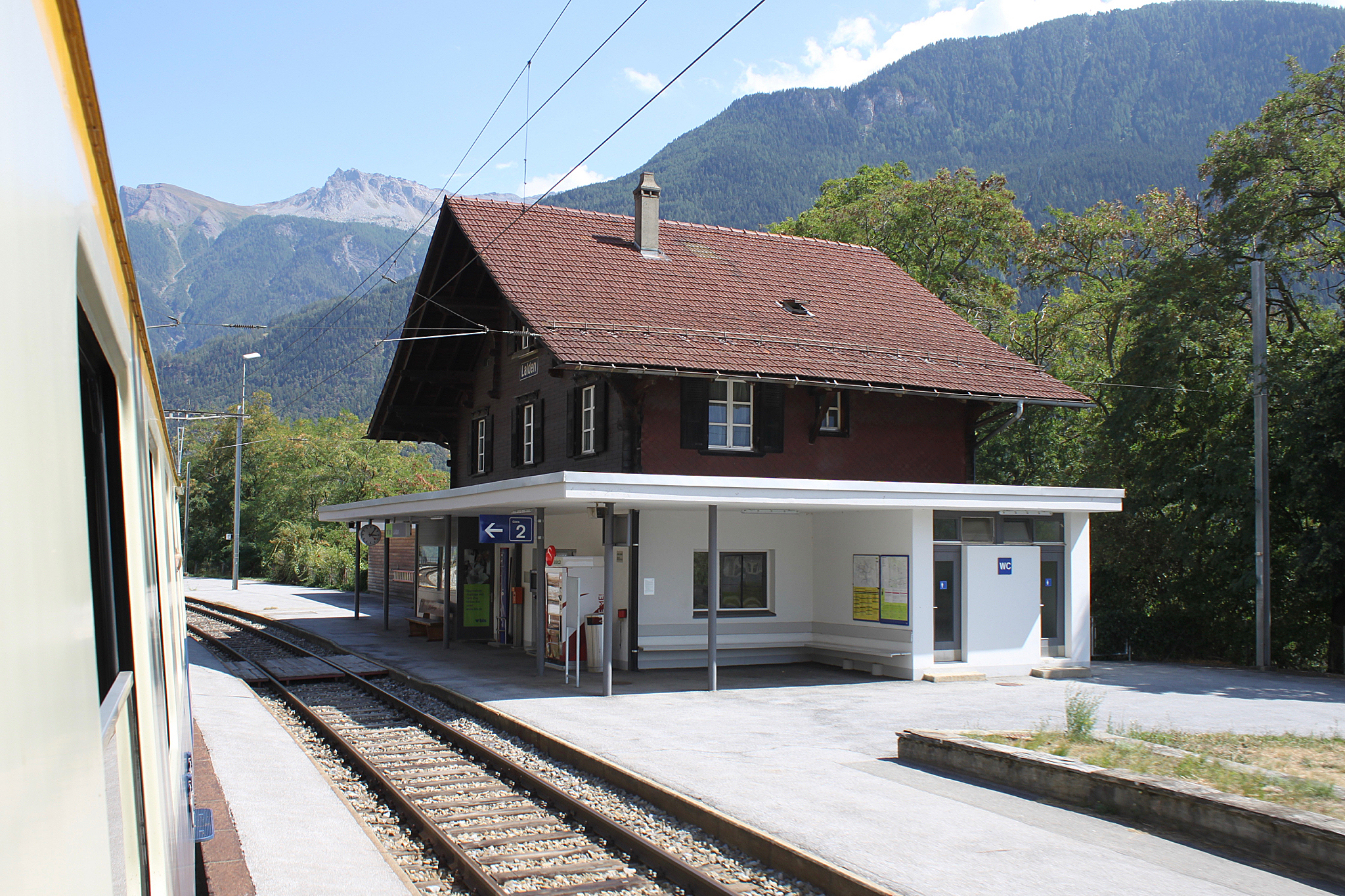
- The station building in 2018

General information
- Location: Lalden, Canton of Valais; Switzerland
- Coordinates: 46°18′05″N 7°54′31″E
- Elevation: 801 m (2,628 ft)
- Owner: BLS AG
- Line: Lötschberg line
- Distance: 67.3 km (41.8 mi) from Spiez
- Platforms: 2 side platforms; 1 island platform
- Tracks: 3
- Train operators: BLS AG

Construction
- Accessible: No

Other information
- Station code: 8507470 (LL)

Passengers
- 2018: Fewer than 50 persons per day (BLS)

Services
Preceding station	BLS	Following station
Eggerberg towards Bern	RE1	Brig Terminus
Location

Lalden is a railway station in the Swiss canton of Valais and municipality of Lalden. The station is located on the Lötschberg line of the BLS AG. The station lies some 1.5 kilometres (0.93 mi) from the village centre of Lalden, and is about 150 metres (490 ft) higher. The station was closed from December 2018 until December 2024 because of track work on the railway line.

== Services ==
As of the December 2024 timetable change, the following services stop at Lalden:

- RegioExpress: service every two hours between Bern and Brig.

== Hiking ==
Lalden station is an intermediate point of the Lötschberg South Ramp walking trail, which parallels the south ramp of the Lötschberg railway as it descends the northern flank of the Rhone valley into Brig. The walk covers the 23 kilometres (14 mi) from Hohtenn station to Brig, passing by the stations of Ausserberg, Eggerberg and Lalden on the way, and offering views south over the Rhone valley.
