= Bürchen =

- Municipality
- Flag Coat of arms
- Location of Bürchen
- Location within Switzerland Location within Canton of Valais
- Coordinates: 46°16′N 7°49′E
- Country: Switzerland
- Canton: Valais
- District: Raron

Government
  - Mayor: Philipp Zenhäusern

Area
  - Total: 13.5 km^{2} (5.2 sq mi)
- Elevation: 1,360 m (4,460 ft)

Population (December 2002)
  - Total: 704
  - Density: 52.1/km^{2} (135/sq mi)
- Time zone: UTC+01:00 (CET)
  - Summer (DST): UTC+02:00 (CEST)
- Postal code: 3935
- SFOS number: 6193
- ISO 3166 code: CH-VS
- Surrounded by: Raron, Törbel, Unterbäch, Visp, Zeneggen
- Website: www.buerchen.ch

Bürchen (Walliser German: Birchu) is a municipality in the district of Raron in the German-speaking part of the canton of Valais in Switzerland.

== History ==
Bürchen is first mentioned in 1307 as ze Birke. In 1363 it was mentioned as Birkonberg, in 1441 as Birchen and in 1755 as Betula.

== Geography ==
Bürchen has an area, as of 2011, of 13.4 square kilometers (5.2 mi^{2}). Of this area, 25.7% is used for agricultural purposes, while 55.3% is forested. Of the rest of the land, 5.4% is settled (buildings or roads) and 13.6% is unproductive land.

The municipality is located in the Westlich Raron district. It consists several hamlets on a high terrace above the southern side of the Rhone valley.

The proposed merger of the municipalities of Eggerberg, Ausserberg, Bürchen, Baltschieder, Visp and Visperterminen was rejected by the residents.

== Coat of arms ==
The blazon of the municipal coat of arms is Azure, three Mullets [of Six] Or.

== Demographics ==
Bürchen has a population (as of December 2020) of 752. As of 2008, 3.2% of the population are resident foreign nationals. Over the last 10 years (2000–2010 ) the population has changed at a rate of 0.8%. It has changed at a rate of 1.5% due to migration and at a rate of 1.3% due to births and deaths.

Most of the population (as of 2000) speaks German (658 or 97.9%) as their first language, French is the second most common (5 or 0.7%) and Albanian is the third (3 or 0.4%). There is 1 person who speaks Italian.

As of 2008, the population was 50.5% male and 49.5% female. The population was made up of 355 Swiss men (49.4% of the population) and 8 (1.1%) non-Swiss men. There were 348 Swiss women (48.4%) and 8 (1.1%) non-Swiss women. Of the population in the municipality, 485 or about 72.2% were born in Bürchen and lived there in 2000. There were 93 or 13.8% who were born in the same canton, while 50 or 7.4% were born somewhere else in Switzerland, and 20 or 3.0% were born outside of Switzerland.

As of 2000, children and teenagers (0–19 years old) make up 25.4% of the population, while adults (20–64 years old) make up 58.2% and seniors (over 64 years old) make up 16.4%.

As of 2000, there were 279 people who were single and never married in the municipality. There were 344 married individuals, 41 widows or widowers and 8 individuals who are divorced.

As of 2000, there were 236 private households in the municipality, and an average of 2.8 persons per household. There were 46 households that consist of only one person and 25 households with five or more people. In 2000, a total of 233 apartments (27.6% of the total) were permanently occupied, while 538 apartments (63.7%) were seasonally occupied and 74 apartments (8.8%) were empty. As of 2009, the construction rate of new housing units was 1.4 new units per 1000 residents. The vacancy rate for the municipality, in 2010, was 0.34%.

The historical population is given in the following chart:

== Sights ==
The entire Turtig/Wandfluh region (which is shared between Bürchen, Raron and Unterbäch) is designated as part of the Inventory of Swiss Heritage Sites.

== Politics ==
In the 2007 federal election the most popular party was the CVP which received 76.38% of the vote. The next three most popular parties were the SVP (14.71%), the SP (7.59%) and the Green Party (0.93%). In the federal election, a total of 446 votes were cast, and the voter turnout was 74.5%.

In the 2009 Conseil d'État/Staatsrat election a total of 318 votes were cast, of which 21 or about 6.6% were invalid. The voter participation was 53.1%, which is similar to the cantonal average of 54.67%. In the 2007 Swiss Council of States election a total of 439 votes were cast, of which 7 or about 1.6% were invalid. The voter participation was 74.3%, which is much more than the cantonal average of 59.88%.

== Economy ==
As of 2010, Bürchen had an unemployment rate of 0.8%. As of 2008, there were 57 people employed in the primary economic sector and about 20 businesses involved in this sector. 30 people were employed in the secondary sector and there were 7 businesses in this sector. 85 people were employed in the tertiary sector, with 24 businesses in this sector. There were 296 residents of the municipality who were employed in some capacity, of which females made up 34.1% of the workforce.

In 2008 the total number of full-time equivalent jobs was 127. The number of jobs in the primary sector was 30, of which 22 were in agriculture and 8 were in forestry or lumber production. The number of jobs in the secondary sector was 29 of which 2 or (6.9%) were in manufacturing and 27 (93.1%) were in construction. The number of jobs in the tertiary sector was 68. In the tertiary sector; 5 or 7.4% were in wholesale or retail sales or the repair of motor vehicles, 12 or 17.6% were in the movement and storage of goods, 34 or 50.0% were in a hotel or restaurant, 5 or 7.4% were the insurance or financial industry, 1 was a technical professional or scientist, 5 or 7.4% were in education.

In 2000, there were 19 workers who commuted into the municipality and 177 workers who commuted away. The municipality is a net exporter of workers, with about 9.3 workers leaving the municipality for every one entering. Of the working population, 27.4% used public transportation to get to work, and 50% used a private car.

== Religion ==
From the 2000 census, 606 or 90.2% were Roman Catholic, while 21 or 3.1% belonged to the Swiss Reformed Church. Of the rest of the population, there was 1 member of an Orthodox church, and there were 8 individuals (or about 1.19% of the population) who belonged to another Christian church. There was 1 individual who was Jewish, and 9 (or about 1.34% of the population) who were Islamic. 9 (or about 1.34% of the population) belonged to no church, are agnostic or atheist, and 21 individuals (or about 3.13% of the population) did not answer the question.

== Education ==
In Bürchen about 224 or (33.3%) of the population have completed non-mandatory upper secondary education, and 31 or (4.6%) have completed additional higher education (either university or a Fachhochschule). Of the 31 who completed tertiary schooling, 83.9% were Swiss men, 16.1% were Swiss women.

During the 2010-2011 school year there were a total of 57 students in the Bürchen school system. The education system in the Canton of Valais allows young children to attend one year of non-obligatory Kindergarten. During that school year, there was one kindergarten class (KG1 or KG2) and 14 kindergarten students. The canton's school system requires students to attend six years of primary school. In Bürchen there were a total of 4 classes and 57 students in the primary school. The secondary school program consists of three lower, obligatory years of schooling (orientation classes), followed by three to five years of optional, advanced schools. All the lower and upper secondary students from Bürchen attend their school in a neighboring municipality.

As of 2000, there were 42 students from Bürchen who attended schools outside the municipality.

Bürchen is home to the Schul- und Gemeindebibliothek (municipal library of Bürchen). The library has (as of 2008) 3,709 books or other media, and loaned out 2,792 items in the same year. It was open a total of 100 days with average of 3 hours per week during that year.

== Winter sports ==
Part of Bürchen is a ski-region, which is connected to the ski-region of Törbel. In winter 2007/2008 a new chairlift has been built.
