= Lalden =

- Municipality
- Flag Coat of arms
- Location of Lalden
- Location within Switzerland Location within Canton of Valais
- Coordinates: 46°17′N 7°54′E
- Country: Switzerland
- Canton: Valais
- District: Visp

Government
  - Mayor: Georges Schnydrig

Area
  - Total: 1.37 km^{2} (0.53 sq mi)
- Elevation: 658 m (2,159 ft)

Population (December 2007)
  - Total: 662
  - Density: 483/km^{2} (1,250/sq mi)
- Time zone: UTC+01:00 (CET)
  - Summer (DST): UTC+02:00 (CEST)
- Postal code: 3931
- SFOS number: 6286
- ISO 3166 code: CH-VS
- Surrounded by: Baltschieder, Brig-Glis, Eggerberg, Mund, Visp
- Website: lalden.ch

Lalden is a municipality in the district of Visp in the canton of Valais in Switzerland.

In a recent census, in 2023, it was found that its population is 733.

== History ==
Lalden is first mentioned in 1218 as Laudona. In 1540 it was mentioned as Lalden.

== Geography ==
Lalden has an area, as of 2011, of 1.3 square kilometers (0.50 mi^{2}). Of this area, 40.5% is used for agricultural purposes, while 16.7% is forested. Of the rest of the land, 26.2% is settled (buildings or roads) and 16.7% is unproductive land.

The municipality is located in the Visp district, on the northern edge of the Rhone valley near Visp. It consists of the old village surrounded by new construction.

== Coat of arms ==
The blazon of the municipal coat of arms is Gules, a Latin Cross Argent issuant from Coupeaux Vert between three Mullets [of Six] Or.

== Demographics ==
Lalden has a population (as of December 2020) of 668. As of 2008, 7.7% of the population are resident foreign nationals. Over the last 10 years (2000–2010 ) the population has changed at a rate of -4%. It has changed at a rate of -2.3% due to migration and at a rate of 0% due to births and deaths.

Most of the population (as of 2000) speaks German (626 or 96.2%) as their first language, Albanian is the second most common (12 or 1.8%) and Serbo-Croatian is the third (10 or 1.5%). There is 1 person who speaks French.

As of 2008, the population was 50.5% male and 49.5% female. The population was made up of 306 Swiss men (46.0% of the population) and 30 (4.5%) non-Swiss men. There were 307 Swiss women (46.2%) and 22 (3.3%) non-Swiss women. Of the population in the municipality, 418 or about 64.2% were born in Lalden and lived there in 2000. There were 168 or 25.8% who were born in the same canton, while 17 or 2.6% were born somewhere else in Switzerland, and 38 or 5.8% were born outside of Switzerland.

As of 2000, children and teenagers (0–19 years old) make up 29.6% of the population, while adults (20–64 years old) make up 55.6% and seniors (over 64 years old) make up 14.7%.

As of 2000, there were 286 people who were single and never married in the municipality. There were 333 married individuals, 28 widows or widowers and 4 individuals who are divorced.

As of 2000, there were 234 private households in the municipality, and an average of 2.8 persons per household. There were 60 households that consist of only one person and 28 households with five or more people. In 2000, a total of 211 apartments (92.5% of the total) were permanently occupied, while 15 apartments (6.6%) were seasonally occupied and 2 apartments (0.9%) were empty.

The historical population is given in the following chart:

== Politics ==
In the 2007 federal election the most popular party was the CVP which received 78.96% of the vote. The next three most popular parties were the SP (9.36%), the SVP (7.36%) and the FDP (1.5%). In the federal election, a total of 351 votes were cast, and the voter turnout was 68.4%.

In the 2009 Conseil d'État/Staatsrat election a total of 395 votes were cast, of which 28 or about 7.1% were invalid. The voter participation was 80.9%, which is much more than the cantonal average of 54.67%. In the 2007 Swiss Council of States election a total of 349 votes were cast, of which 6 or about 1.7% were invalid. The voter participation was 69.0%, which is much more than the cantonal average of 59.88%.

== Economy ==
As of 2010, Lalden had an unemployment rate of 1.9%. As of 2008, there were 40 people employed in the primary economic sector and about 20 businesses involved in this sector. 262 people were employed in the secondary sector and there were 12 businesses in this sector. 15 people were employed in the tertiary sector, with 5 businesses in this sector. There were 270 residents of the municipality who were employed in some capacity, of which females made up 31.1% of the workforce.

In 2008 the total number of full-time equivalent jobs was 277. The number of jobs in the primary sector was 15, all of which were in agriculture. The number of jobs in the secondary sector was 252 of which 201 or (79.8%) were in manufacturing and 51 (20.2%) were in construction. The number of jobs in the tertiary sector was 10. In the tertiary sector; 2 or 20.0% were in a hotel or restaurant, 6 or 60.0% were in education.

In 2000, there were 137 workers who commuted into the municipality and 223 workers who commuted away. The municipality is a net exporter of workers, with about 1.6 workers leaving the municipality for every one entering. About 4.4% of the workforce coming into Lalden are coming from outside Switzerland. Of the working population, 11.5% used public transportation to get to work, and 55.6% used a private car.

== Transport ==
Lalden railway station, on the Lötschberg line, is some 1.5 kilometres (0.93 mi) from the village centre of Lalden, and is about 150 metres (490 ft) higher. It is served by trains to Bern, Thun and Brig. A PostAuto bus service links Lalden village to Brig and Visp.

== Religion ==
From the 2000 census, 599 or 92.0% were Roman Catholic, while 11 or 1.7% belonged to the Swiss Reformed Church. Of the rest of the population, there were 9 members of an Orthodox church (or about 1.38% of the population). There were 12 (or about 1.84% of the population) who were Islamic. 4 (or about 0.61% of the population) belonged to no church, are agnostic or atheist, and 16 individuals (or about 2.46% of the population) did not answer the question.

== Education ==
In Lalden about 246 or (37.8%) of the population have completed non-mandatory upper secondary education, and 40 or (6.1%) have completed additional higher education (either university or a Fachhochschule). Of the 40 who completed tertiary schooling, 70.0% were Swiss men, 20.0% were Swiss women.

During the 2010–2011 school year there were a total of 47 students in the Lalden school system. The education system in the Canton of Valais allows young children to attend one year of non-obligatory Kindergarten. During that school year, there was one kindergarten class (KG1 or KG2) and 8 kindergarten students. The canton's school system requires students to attend six years of primary school. In Lalden there were a total of 4 classes and 47 students in the primary school. The secondary school program consists of three lower, obligatory years of schooling (orientation classes), followed by three to five years of optional, advanced schools. All the lower and upper secondary students from Lalden attend their school in a neighboring municipality.

As of 2000, there were 61 students from Lalden who attended schools outside the municipality.
