= Eggerberg =

- Municipality
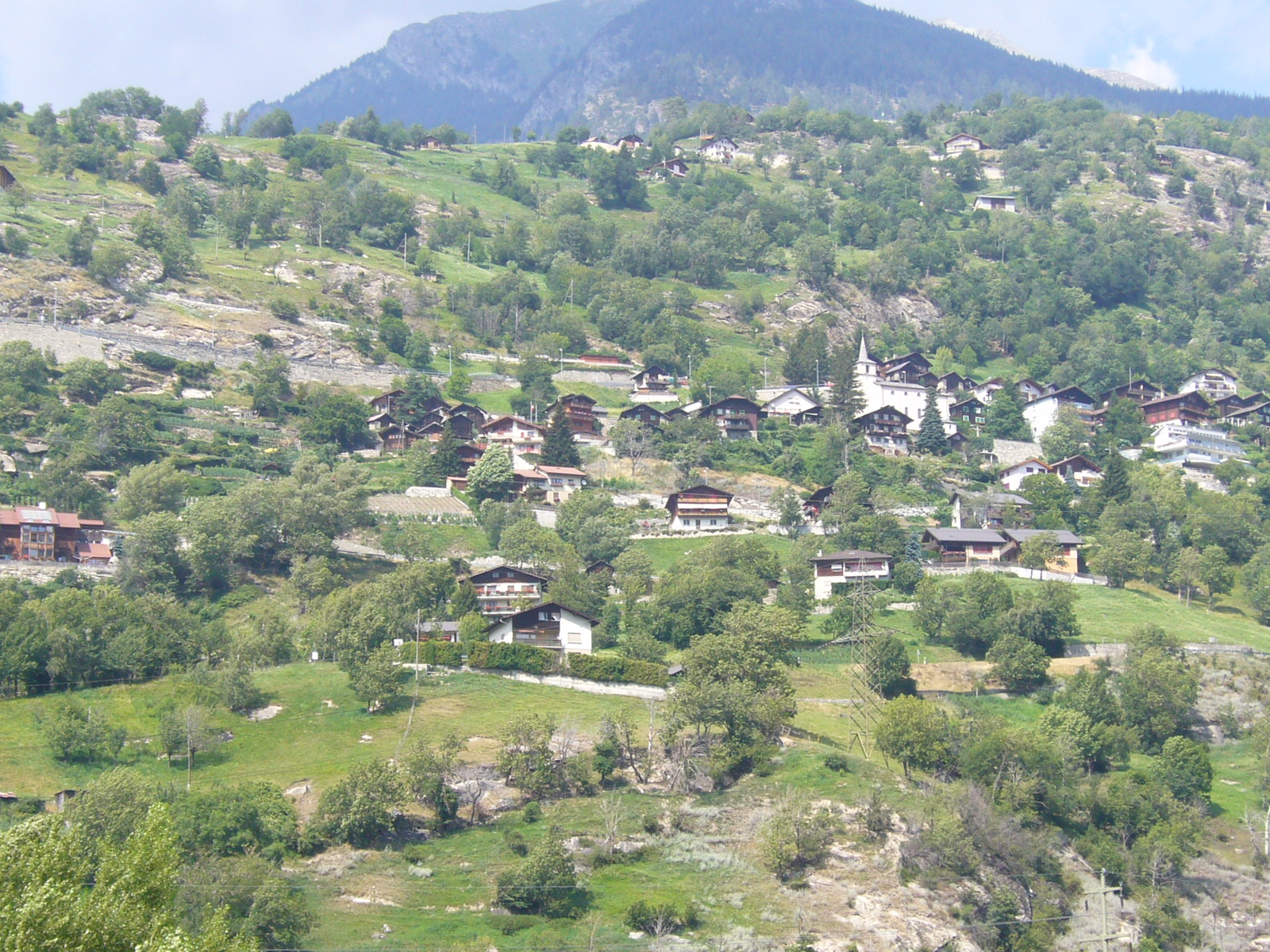
- Eggerberg village

- Flag Coat of arms
- Location of Eggerberg
- Location within Switzerland Location within Canton of Valais
- Coordinates: 46°18′N 7°53′E
- Country: Switzerland
- Canton: Valais
- District: Brig

Government
  - Mayor: Rafaela Wasmer

Area
  - Total: 6.0 km^{2} (2.3 sq mi)
- Elevation: 852 m (2,795 ft)

Population (December 2002)
  - Total: 377
  - Density: 63/km^{2} (160/sq mi)
- Time zone: UTC+01:00 (CET)
  - Summer (DST): UTC+02:00 (CEST)
- Postal code: 3939
- SFOS number: 6004
- ISO 3166 code: CH-VS
- Surrounded by: Ausserberg, Baltschieder, Lalden, Mund
- Twin towns: Rothrist (Switzerland)
- Website: www.eggerberg.ch

Eggerberg is a village and municipality in the district of Brig in the canton of Valais in Switzerland. Besides the village of Eggerberg, the municipality includes the settlements of Berg, Eggen, Finnen, Mühlackern and Wirmschland.

== History ==
Eggerberg is first mentioned in 1307 as Eccun.

== Geography ==
Eggerberg has an area, as of 2011, of 6 square kilometers (2.3 mi^{2}). Of this area, 15.2% is used for agricultural purposes, while 56.4% is forested. Of the rest of the land, 5.5% is settled (buildings or roads) and 22.9% is unproductive land.

The municipality is located on the slopes above the northern Rhone valley, near Visp. It consists of the village of Eggerberg and the hamlets of Mühlackern, Wirmschland, Berg, Eggen and summer only settlement of Finnen.

The proposed merger of the municipalities of Eggerberg, Ausserberg, Bürchen, Baltschieder, Visp and Visperterminen was rejected by the residents.

== Coat of arms ==
The blazon of the municipal coat of arms is Azure, issuant from Coupeaux Vert a Latin Cross Argent between in chief dexter a Moon Or and sinister a Sun of the Same.

== Demographics ==
Eggerberg has a population (as of December 2020) of 324. As of 2008, 1.7% of the population are resident foreign nationals. Over the last 10 years (1999–2009 ) the population has changed at a rate of -13.6%. It has changed at a rate of -7.1% due to migration and at a rate of -3.3% due to births and deaths.

Most of the population (as of 2000) speaks German (378 or 99.0%) as their first language, French is the second most common (2 or 0.5%) and Italian is the third (1 or 0.3%).

As of 2008, the gender distribution of the population was 47.8% male and 52.2% female. The population was made up of 157 Swiss men (45.8% of the population) and 7 (2.0%) non-Swiss men. There were 172 Swiss women (50.1%) and 7 (2.0%) non-Swiss women. Of the population in the municipality 269 or about 70.4% were born in Eggerberg and lived there in 2000. There were 83 or 21.7% who were born in the same canton, while 16 or 4.2% were born somewhere else in Switzerland, and 5 or 1.3% were born outside of Switzerland. The age distribution of the population (as of 2000) is children and teenagers (0–19 years old) make up 27.5% of the population, while adults (20–64 years old) make up 58.1% and seniors (over 64 years old) make up 14.4%.

As of 2000, there were 159 people who were single and never married in the municipality. There were 193 married individuals, 25 widows or widowers and 5 individuals who are divorced.

As of 2000, there were 135 private households in the municipality, and an average of 2.7 persons per household. There were 35 households that consist of only one person and 17 households with five or more people. Out of a total of 147 households that answered this question, 23.8% were households made up of just one person and there were 4 adults who lived with their parents. Of the rest of the households, there are 26 married couples without children, 61 married couples with children There were 6 single parents with a child or children. There were 3 households that were made up of unrelated people and 12 households that were made up of some sort of institution or another collective housing.

In 2000 there were 131 single family homes (or 68.6% of the total) out of a total of 191 inhabited buildings. There were 41 multi-family buildings (21.5%), along with 13 multi-purpose buildings that were mostly used for housing (6.8%) and 6 other use buildings (commercial or industrial) that also had some housing (3.1%).

In 2000, a total of 115 apartments (48.5% of the total) were permanently occupied, while 105 apartments (44.3%) were seasonally occupied and 17 apartments (7.2%) were empty.

The historical population is given in the following chart:

== Politics ==
In the 2007 federal election the most popular party was the CVP which received 66.73% of the vote. The next three most popular parties were the SVP (16.87%), the SP (13.66%) and the FDP (1.71%). In the federal election, a total of 216 votes were cast, and the voter turnout was 74.7%.

In the 2009 Conseil d'État/Staatsrat election a total of 172 votes were cast, of which 6 or about 3.5% were invalid. The voter participation was 60.6%, which is much more than the cantonal average of 54.67%. In the 2007 Swiss Council of States election a total of 212 votes were cast, of which 3 or about 1.4% were invalid. The voter participation was 73.4%, which is much more than the cantonal average of 59.88%.

== Economy ==
As of 2010, Eggerberg had an unemployment rate of 0.7%. As of 2008, there were 32 people employed in the primary economic sector and about 16 businesses involved in this sector. 5 people were employed in the secondary sector and there were 2 businesses in this sector. 45 people were employed in the tertiary sector, with 10 businesses in this sector. There were 192 residents of the municipality who were employed in some capacity, of which females made up 41.1% of the workforce.

In 2008 the total number of full-time equivalent jobs was 52. The number of jobs in the primary sector was 8, all of which were in agriculture. The number of jobs in the secondary sector was 5, all of which were in construction. The number of jobs in the tertiary sector was 39. In the tertiary sector; 1 was in the sale or repair of motor vehicles, 21 or 53.8% were in the movement and storage of goods, 5 or 12.8% were in a hotel or restaurant, 1 was the insurance or financial industry, 2 or 5.1% were technical professionals or scientists, 2 or 5.1% were in education.

In 2000, there were 17 workers who commuted into the municipality and 159 workers who commuted away. The municipality is a net exporter of workers, with about 9.4 workers leaving the municipality for every one entering. Of the working population, 35.4% used public transportation to get to work, and 51.6% used a private car.

== Transport ==
Eggerberg railway station, on the Lötschberg line, is adjacent to the village of Eggerberg. It is served by trains to Bern, Thun and Brig. A PostAuto bus service links Finnen, Eggen, Eggerberg, Baltschieder and Visp.

== Religion ==
From the 2000 census, 354 or 92.7% were Roman Catholic, while 6 or 1.6% belonged to the Swiss Reformed Church. Of the rest of the population, there was 1 individual who belongs to the Christian Catholic Church, and there were 22 individuals (or about 5.76% of the population) who belonged to another Christian church. 3 (or about 0.79% of the population) belonged to no church, are agnostic or atheist, and 7 individuals (or about 1.83% of the population) did not answer the question.

== Education ==
In Eggerberg about 134 or (35.1%) of the population have completed non-mandatory upper secondary education, and 11 or (2.9%) have completed additional higher education (either university or a Fachhochschule). Of the 11 who completed tertiary schooling, 90.9% were Swiss men, 9.1% were Swiss women.

During the 2010-2011 school year there were a total of 10 students in the Eggerberg school system. The education system in the Canton of Valais allows young children to attend one year of non-obligatory Kindergarten. During that school year, there were no kindergarten classes (KG1 or KG2) and there were no kindergarten students. The canton's school system requires students to attend six years of primary school. In Eggerberg there was one class and 10 students in the primary school. The secondary school program consists of three lower, obligatory years of schooling (orientation classes), followed by three to five years of optional, advanced schools. All the lower secondary students from Eggerberg attend their school in a neighboring municipality. All the upper secondary students attended school in another municipality.

As of 2000, there was one student in Eggerberg who came from another municipality, while 15 residents attended schools outside the municipality.
