= Raron =

Place in Valais, Switzerland

- Municipality
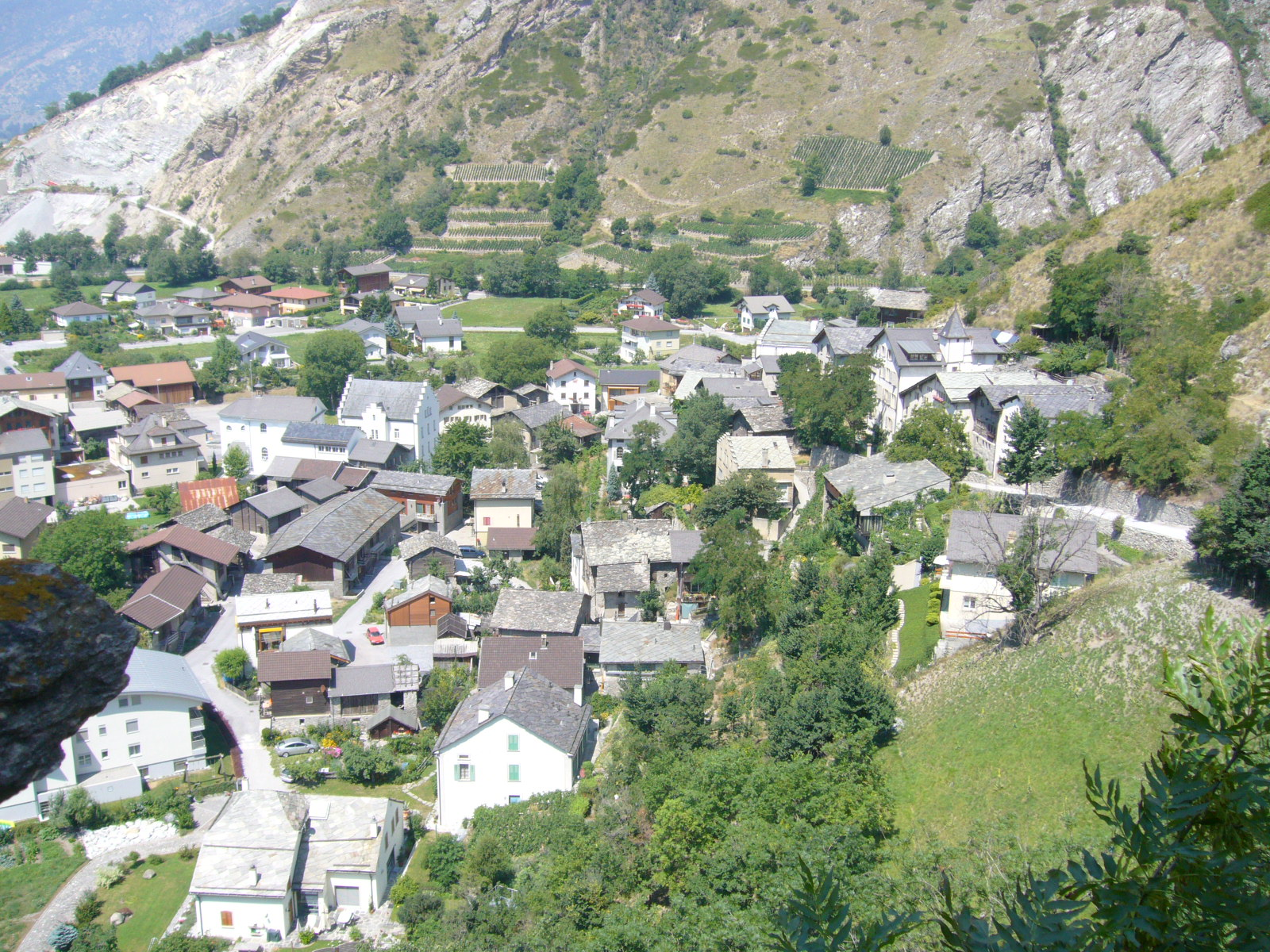

- Flag Coat of arms
- Location of Raron
- Location within Switzerland Location within Canton of Valais
- Coordinates: 46°18.6′N 7°48′E
- Country: Switzerland
- Canton: Valais
- District: Raron

Government
  - Mayor: Daniel Troger

Area
  - Total: 30.3 km^{2} (11.7 sq mi)
- Elevation: 638 m (2,093 ft)

Population (December 2002)
  - Total: 1,896
  - Density: 62.6/km^{2} (162/sq mi)
- Time zone: UTC+01:00 (CET)
  - Summer (DST): UTC+02:00 (CEST)
- Postal code: 3942
- SFOS number: 6199
- ISO 3166 code: CH-VS
- Surrounded by: Ausserberg, Baltschieder, Blatten (Lötschen), Bürchen, Niedergesteln, Unterbäch, Visp, Wiler (Lötschen), Zeneggen
- Website: www.raron.ch

Raron (French: Rarogne) is a municipality in the district of Raron in the canton of Valais in Switzerland.

== History ==
Aerial view (1955)

Raron is first mentioned around 1101–1200 as Rarogni. In 1146 it was mentioned as Rarun.

A settlement on the Heidnischbiel, a burial ground at Blatt and scattered finds in the surrounding vineyards indicate that there was a permanent settlement in the vicinity of Raron from the Neolithic to the La Tène period. The settlement seems to have been abandoned in the Roman era.

During the Middle Ages, the hill west of the Heidnischbiel, was fortified. In the 12th century the Viztum of Raron was established and the Viztume tower house was added to the hill. The tower The families of Raron, Asperlin and de Chevron-Villette all held the office of Vizedominat of Raron as a fief from the Bishop of Sion. During the Raron affair of 1417, the tower was partially destroyed. It was purchased in 1538 by the municipality and then served as city hall and a jail. At the beginning of the 21st Century it was privately owned. In addition, to the Viztume tower, the Meier tower was built in the 13th century. The Meier tower was mostly occupied by the Asperlin family. Raron was important in local politics and held the title Raronia prudens. One bishop and several provincial governors came from Raron.

The center of the local parish was, most likely, originally St. German. The church of St. German existed since about the 8th or 9th centuries. By 1299, the church in Raron had become a parish church. This large parish comprised the four municipalities of the middle third of the Zenden of Raron. In 1554, Unterbäch and Bürchen separated from the parish and in 1867 Ausserberg left as well. The entire Church of St. Romanus, except the tower, was destroyed in 1494 when the Bietschbach flooded. The tower of the church remained until 1938, when it was demolished. The uninhabited Meier tower was converted into a gothic church by Ulrich Ruffiner in 1508–1514. In the early 16th century, this castle church was dedicated to St. Romanus to replace the earlier church. The restored castle church was abandoned in the 1970s and was replaced in 1974 a modern rock church, which was built at the foot of the hill.

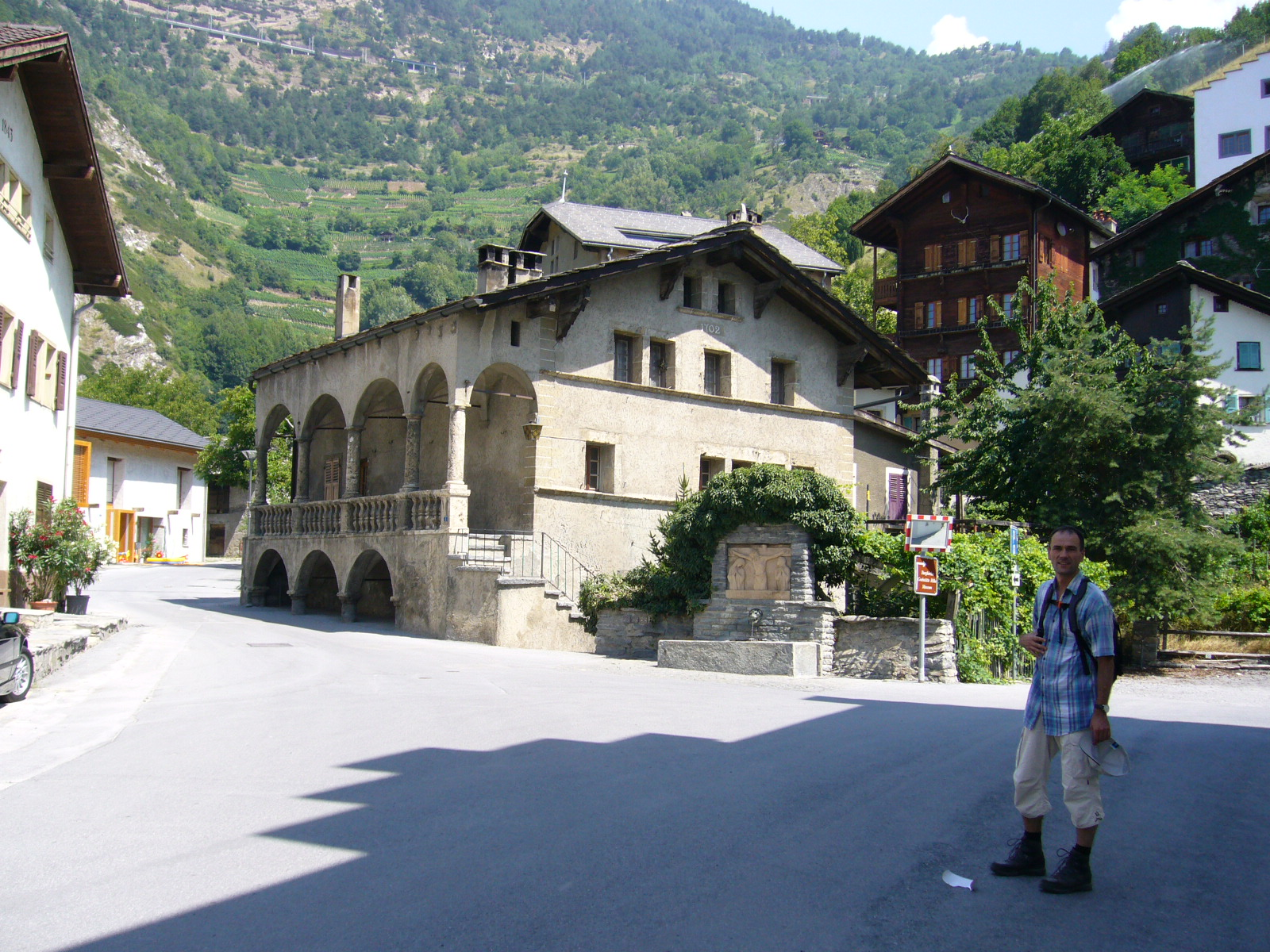
Maxenhaus

The big stone houses of Raron testify to the prosperity of the 17th and 18th centuries. These historic houses include the Maxenhaus, the Zentriegenhaus, the Zmilacherhaus and houses of the von Roten family as well as the Kalbermatterhaus in Turtig and the tower house in Rotigoblatt. Traffic through Raron over the St. German pass to Visp contributed to the prosperity of the town. However, the construction of the valley road to the left side of the valley in the 19th century, deprived Raron of this source of revenue. Due to the containment of the Rhone and Bietschbach rivers, the draining of the swamps in 1865–1885 and the construction of the Lonza Entsumpfungs canal in 1920, the valley opened up for agriculture.

Raron evolved in the second half of the 20th century into a modern industrial and small business town. Residential and commercial buildings spread out across the valley floor. In the 1940s a military airfield for the Swiss Air Force was built in the valley with an aircraft cavern, but it was abandoned in the army reform of 1994. Air Zermatt established a helicopter base in Raron in 1980. The south portal of the Lötschberg Base Tunnel was opened to the east of the village in 2007. In 2000 more than 60% of the working population worked outside of the municipality, especially in Visp, Brig and Steg.

Raron is known for periodic Passion and Mysteries of the Rosary plays.

== Geography ==
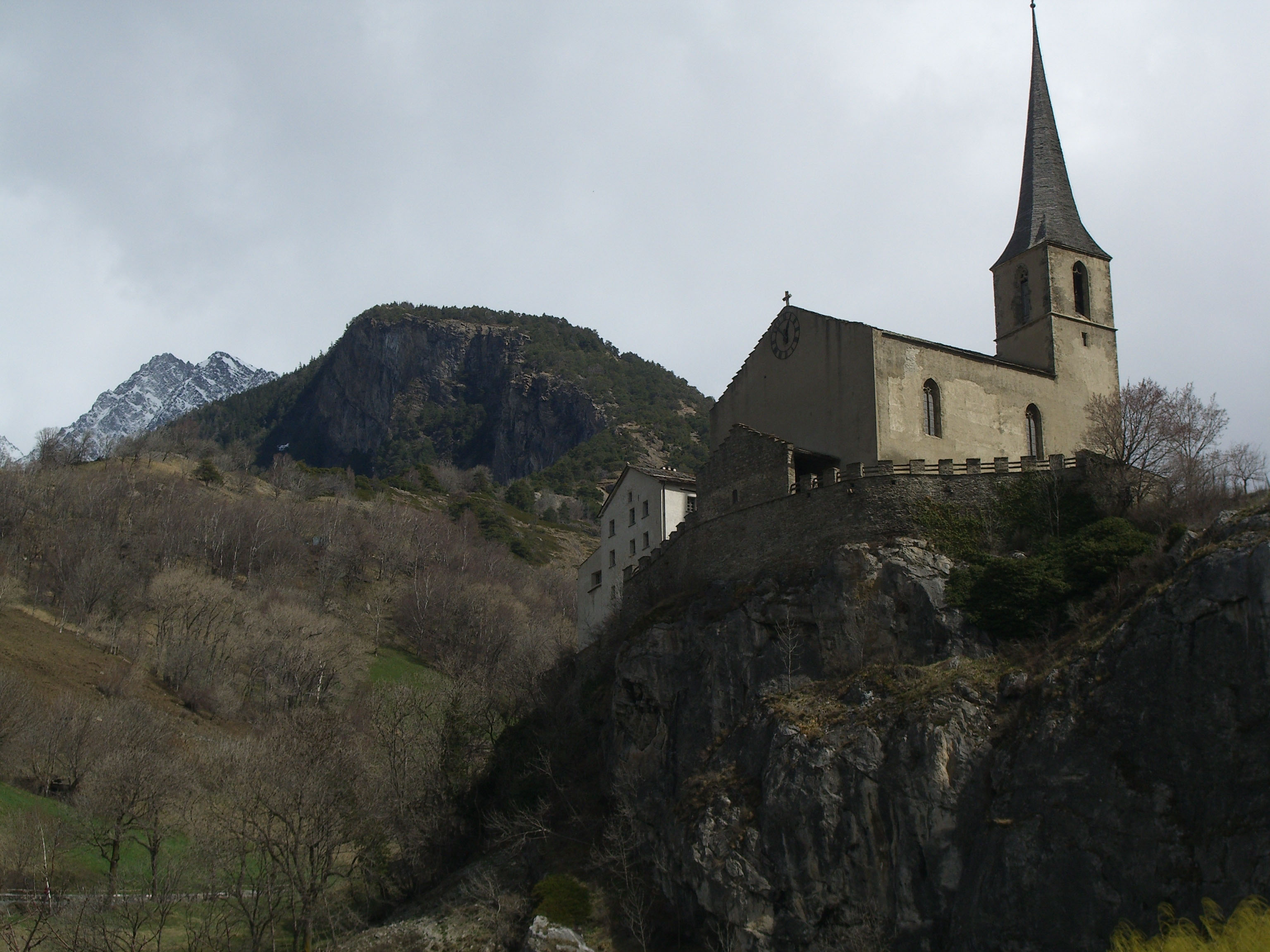
Raron Church and surroundings

Raron has an area, as of 2011, of 30.3 square kilometers (11.7 mi^{2}). Of this area, 15.5% is used for agricultural purposes, while 19.0% is forested. Of the rest of the land, 4.8% is settled (buildings or roads) and 60.7% is unproductive land.

The municipality is the capital of the Westlich Raron district. It includes the villages of Raron and Sankt German and the hamlets of Turtig and Rarnerchumma. It is located on the right side of the Rhone valley at the entrance to the Bietsch valley and west of Visp.

=== Climate ===
Tundra climates are characterized by sub-freezing mean annual temperatures, large annual temperature ranges, and moderately low precipitation. The Köppen Climate Classification subtype for this climate is ET (Tundra Climate).

== Coat of arms ==
The blazon of the municipal coat of arms is Raron Gules, a Vine eradicated and fructed Or leaved Vert.

== Demographics ==
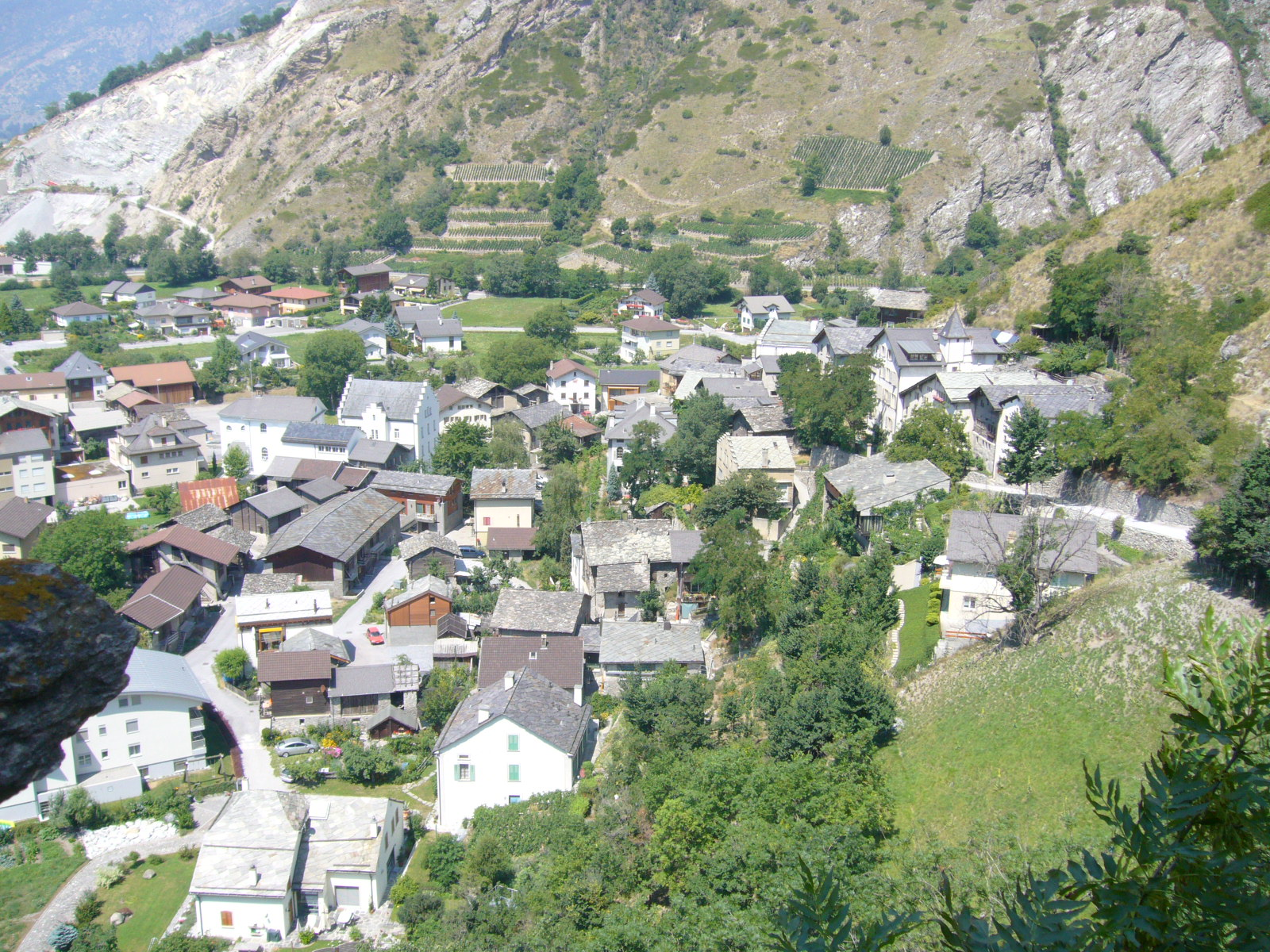
Raron village

Raron has a population (as of December 2020) of 1,949. As of 2008, 12.4% of the population are resident foreign nationals. Over the last 10 years (2000–2010) the population has changed at a rate of 2.5%. It has changed at a rate of 4.2% due to migration and at a rate of 3.5% due to births and deaths.

Most of the population (as of 2000) speaks German (1,534 or 91.7%) as their first language, Albanian is the second most common (48 or 2.9%) and French is the third (34 or 2.0%). There are 18 people who speak Italian and 1 person who speaks Romansh.

As of 2008, the population was 50.9% male and 49.1% female. The population was made up of 804 Swiss men (44.6% of the population) and 112 (6.2%) non-Swiss men. There were 799 Swiss women (44.4%) and 86 (4.8%) non-Swiss women. Of the population in the municipality, 849 or about 50.8% were born in Raron and lived there in 2000. There were 468 or 28.0% who were born in the same canton, while 138 or 8.3% were born somewhere else in Switzerland, and 170 or 10.2% were born outside of Switzerland.

As of 2000, children and teenagers (0–19 years old) make up 25% of the population, while adults (20–64 years old) make up 61.4% and seniors (over 64 years old) make up 13.6%.

As of 2000, there were 643 people who were single and never married in the municipality. There were 904 married individuals, 77 widows or widowers and 48 individuals who are divorced.

As of 2000, there were 636 private households in the municipality, and an average of 2.6 persons per household. There were 145 households that consist of only one person and 53 households with five or more people. In 2000, a total of 593 apartments (83.4% of the total) were permanently occupied, while 91 apartments (12.8%) were seasonally occupied and 27 apartments (3.8%) were empty. As of 2009, the construction rate of new housing units was 0.6 new units per 1000 residents. The vacancy rate for the municipality, in 2010, was 2.49%.

The historical population is given in the following chart:

== Heritage sites of national significance ==
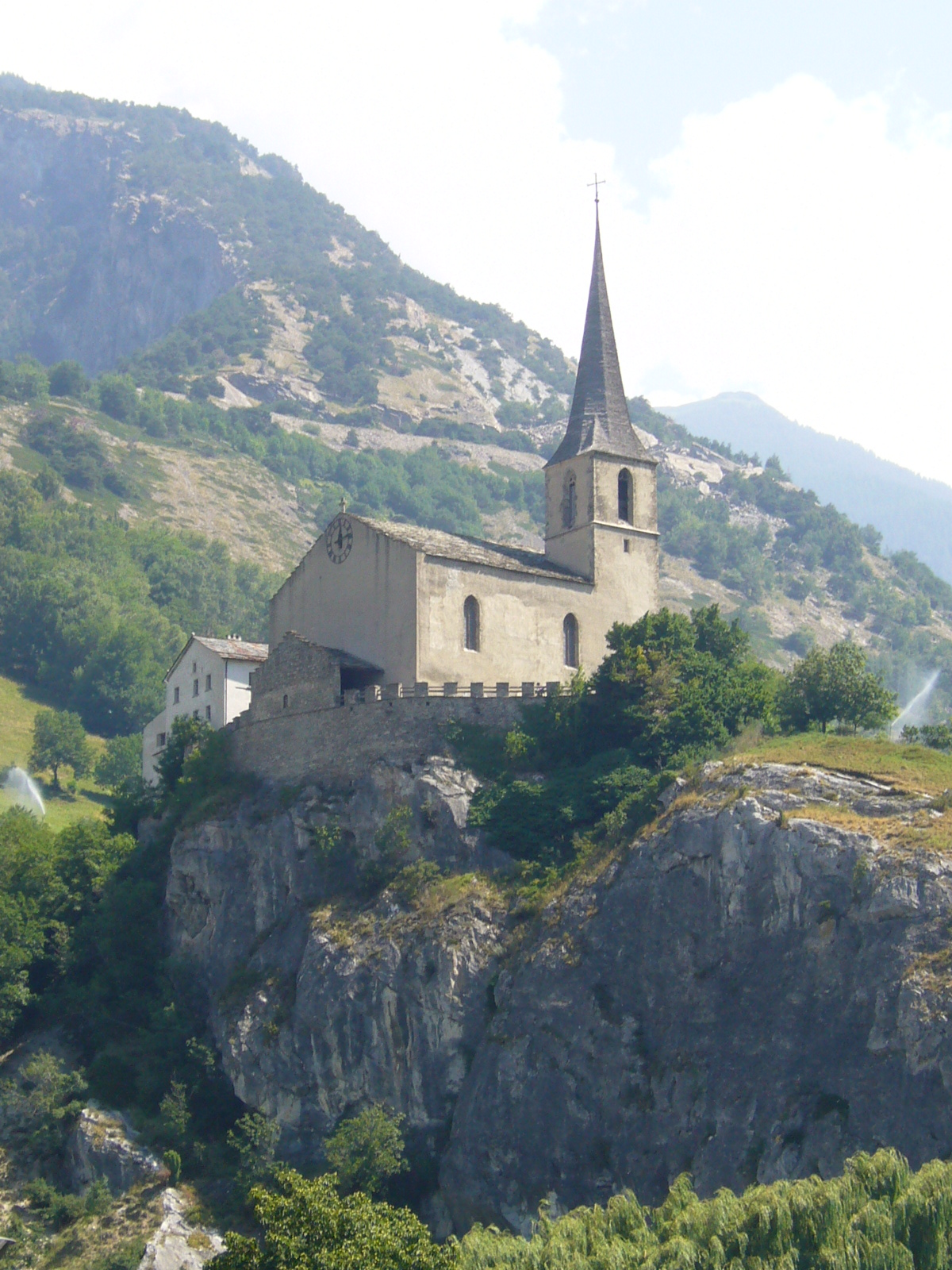
Church of St. Roman

The prehistoric site or Heidnischbühl, the Church of St. Roman with old Rectory and the Viztume tower house are listed as Swiss heritage site of national significance. The entire village of Raron, the hamlet of Rarner Chumma and the Turtig/Wandfluh region are all part of the Inventory of Swiss Heritage Sites.

== Politics ==
In the 2007 federal election the most popular party was the CVP which received 69.03% of the vote. The next three most popular parties were the SVP (13.56%), the SP (12.87%) and the Green Party (2.83%). In the federal election, a total of 862 votes were cast, and the voter turnout was 65.9%.

In the 2009 Conseil d'État/Staatsrat election a total of 785 votes were cast, of which 91 or about 11.6% were invalid. The voter participation was 61.7%, which is much more than the cantonal average of 54.67%. In the 2007 Swiss Council of States election a total of 859 votes were cast, of which 31 or about 3.6% were invalid. The voter participation was 66.2%, which is much more than the cantonal average of 59.88%.

== Economy ==
As of 2010, Raron had an unemployment rate of 1.7%. As of 2008, there were 76 people employed in the primary economic sector and about 31 businesses involved in this sector. 442 people were employed in the secondary sector and there were 23 businesses in this sector. 254 people were employed in the tertiary sector, with 57 businesses in this sector. There were 810 residents of the municipality who were employed in some capacity, of which females made up 36.7% of the workforce.

In 2008 the total number of full-time equivalent jobs was 655. The number of jobs in the primary sector was 34, of which 28 were in agriculture and 5 were in forestry or lumber production. The number of jobs in the secondary sector was 426 of which 151 or (35.4%) were in manufacturing, 2 or (0.5%) were in mining and 273 (64.1%) were in construction. The number of jobs in the tertiary sector was 195. In the tertiary sector; 37 or 19.0% were in wholesale or retail sales or the repair of motor vehicles, 41 or 21.0% were in the movement and storage of goods, 39 or 20.0% were in a hotel or restaurant, 11 or 5.6% were the insurance or financial industry, 20 or 10.3% were technical professionals or scientists, 26 or 13.3% were in education and 1 was in health care.

In 2000, there were 325 workers who commuted into the municipality and 509 workers who commuted away. The municipality is a net exporter of workers, with about 1.6 workers leaving the municipality for every one entering. About 8.6% of the workforce coming into Raron are coming from outside Switzerland. Of the working population, 22.3% used public transportation to get to work, and 55.1% used a private car.

== Religion ==
From the 2000 census, 1,435 or 85.8% were Roman Catholic, while 56 or 3.3% belonged to the Swiss Reformed Church. Of the rest of the population, there were 8 members of an Orthodox church (or about 0.48% of the population), and there were 10 individuals (or about 0.60% of the population) who belonged to another Christian church. There were 78 (or about 4.67% of the population) who were Islamic. There was 1 person who was Buddhist. 31 (or about 1.85% of the population) belonged to no church, are agnostic or atheist, and 58 individuals (or about 3.47% of the population) did not answer the question.

== Education ==
In Raron about 647 or (38.7%) of the population have completed non-mandatory upper secondary education, and 118 or (7.1%) have completed additional higher education (either university or a Fachhochschule). Of the 118 who completed tertiary schooling, 80.5% were Swiss men, 10.2% were Swiss women, 6.8% were non-Swiss men.

During the 2010-2011 school year there were a total of 289 students in the Raron school system. The education system in the Canton of Valais allows young children to attend one year of non-obligatory Kindergarten. During that school year, there 2 kindergarten classes (KG1 or KG2) and 37 kindergarten students. The canton's school system requires students to attend six years of primary school. In Raron there were a total of 9 classes and 167 students in the primary school. The secondary school program consists of three lower, obligatory years of schooling (orientation classes), followed by three to five years of optional, advanced schools. There were 122 lower secondary students who attended school in Raron. All the upper secondary students attended school in another municipality.

As of 2000, there were 55 students in Raron who came from another municipality, while 71 residents attended schools outside the municipality.

== Notable residents ==
The poet Rainer Maria Rilke is buried in the cemetery of the old church there.
