= Gebidumsee =

Lake in Valais, Switzerland

- Gibidumsee
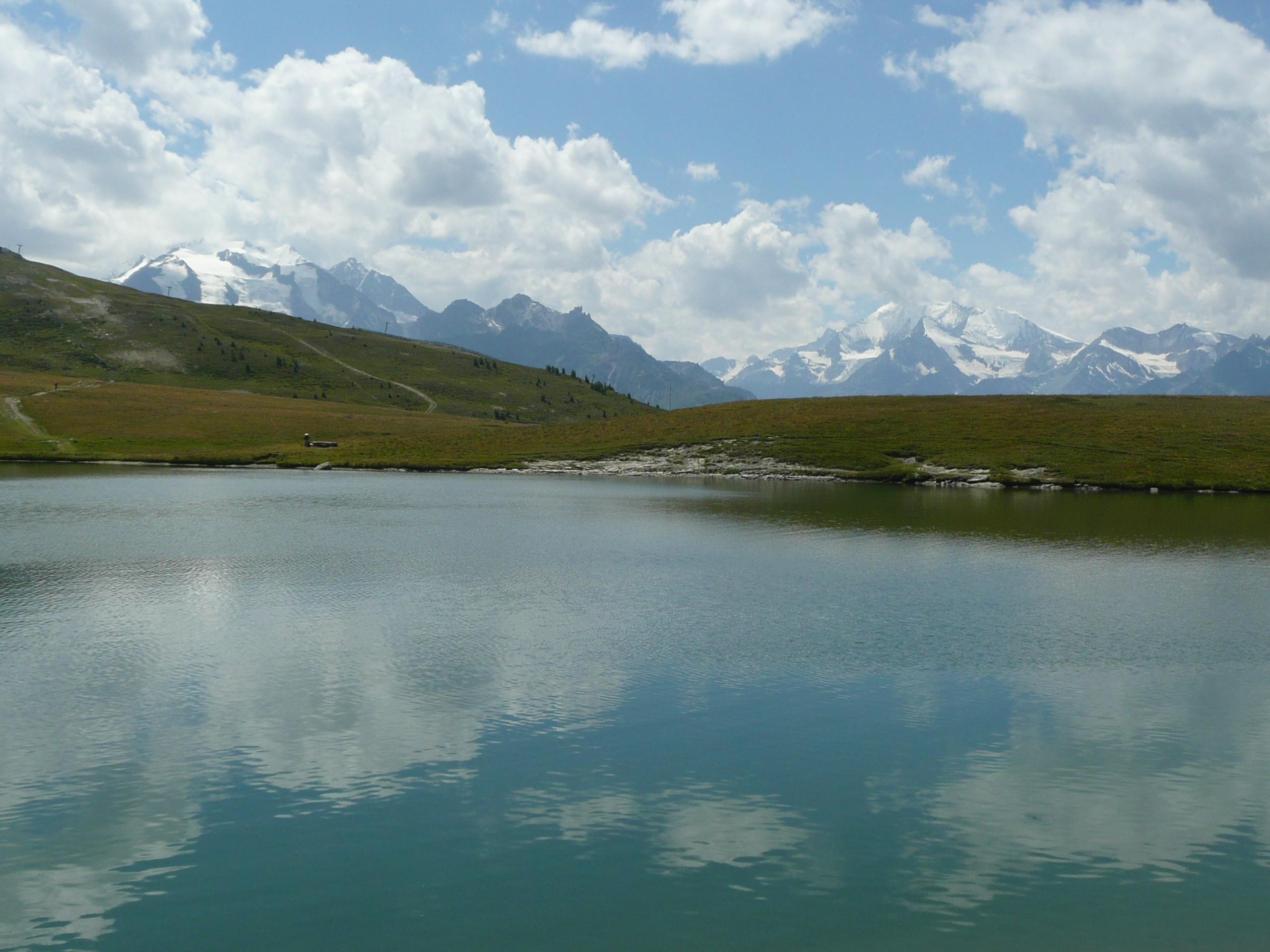

- Location within Canton of Valais Location within Piedmont Location within Switzerland Location within Italy Location within Alps
- Interactive map of Gebidumsee
- Location: Visperterminen, Valais
- Coordinates: 46°15′30″N 7°56′25″E
- Basin countries: Switzerland
- Surface area: 2 ha (4.9 acres)
- Surface elevation: 2,193 m (7,195 ft)

Gebidumsee (or "Gibidumsee") is a lake near Gebidum Pass in the municipality of Visperterminen, Valais, Switzerland.

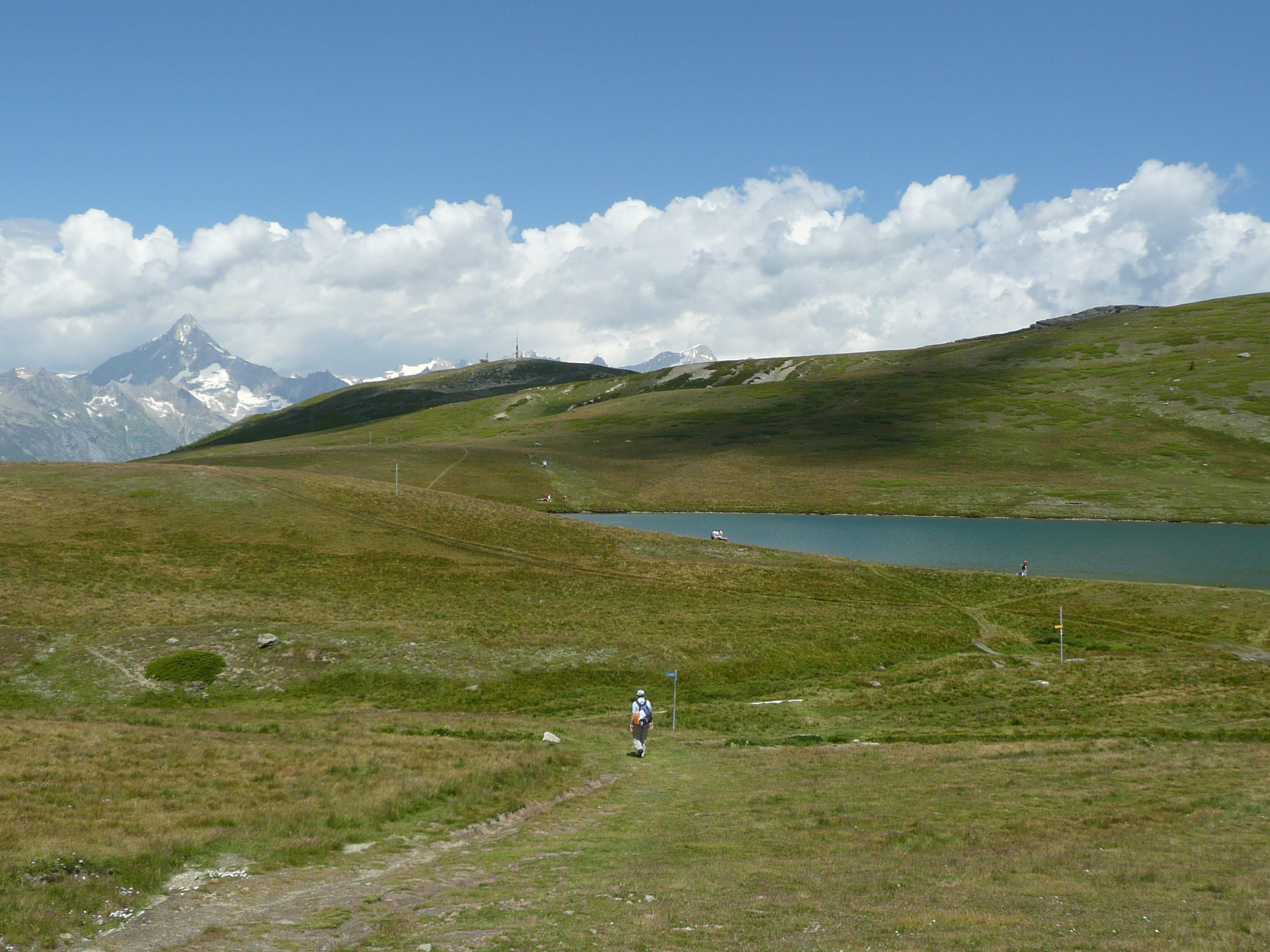
