= Brig railway station =

Railway station in Brig, Switzerland

Brig
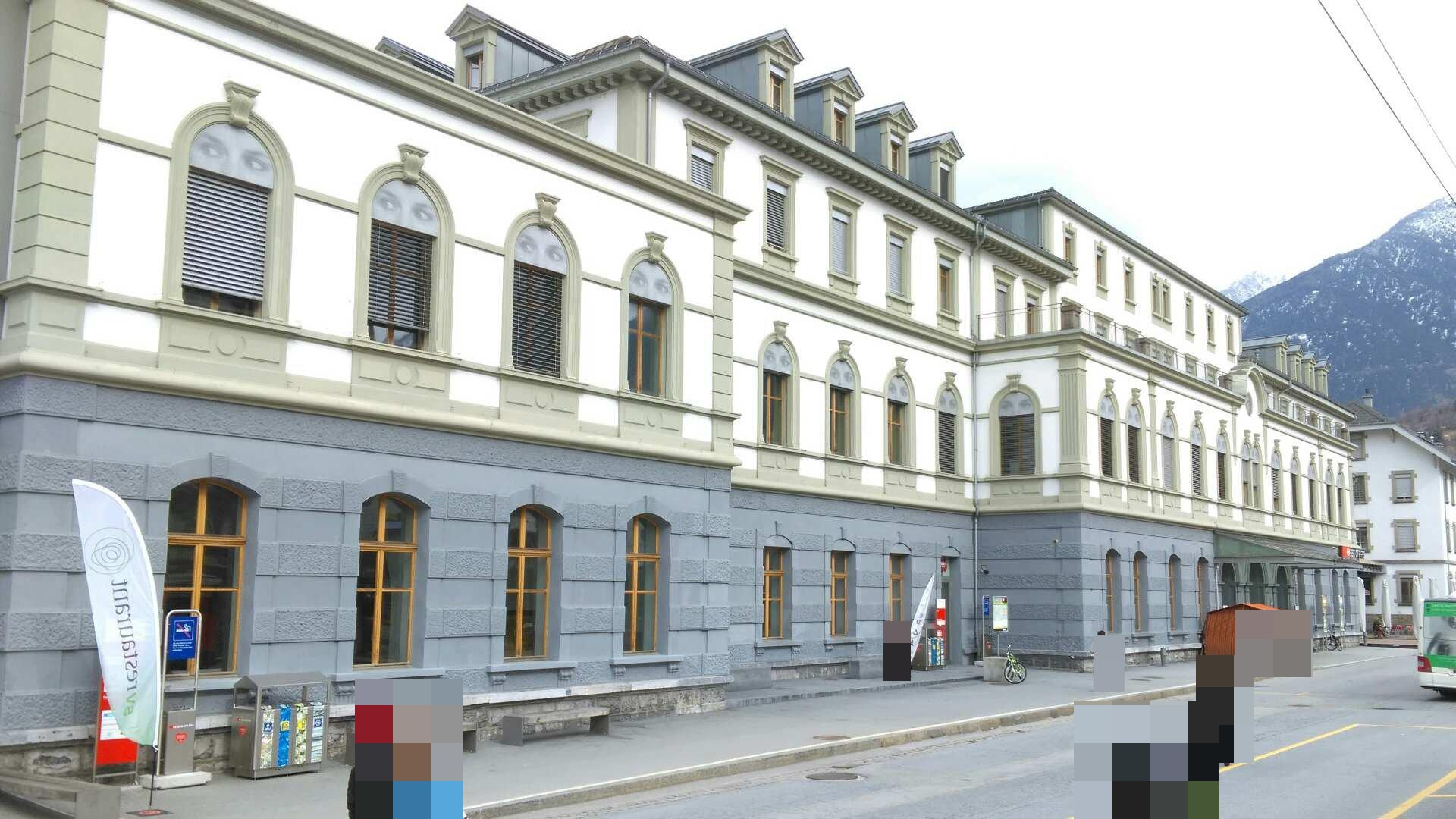
- The station building in 2017

General information
- Location: Bahnhof 1 Brig; Switzerland
- Coordinates: 46°19′10″N 7°59′17″E
- Elevation: 677 m (2,221 ft)
- Owner: Swiss Federal Railways
- Lines: Lausanne–Brig; Bern–Lötschberg–Brig
- Distance: 145.6 km (90.5 mi) from Lausanne; 73.8 km (45.9 mi) from Spiez
- Platforms: 7: 3 island platforms; 1 side platform
- Tracks: 9
- Train operators: BLS AG; RegionAlps; Swiss Federal Railways
- Connections: PostAuto AG buses; Local buses

Construction
- Parking: Yes (55 spaces)
- Cycle facilities: Yes (330 spaces)
- Accessible: Partly

Other information
- Station code: 8501609 (BR)
- IATA code: ZDL

History
- Opened: 18 June 1878

Passengers
- 2025: 21,200 per day (BLS, MGB, RegionAlps, SBB)
- Rank: 34 out of 1,095 (Note: Tied with Dietikon railway station.)

Services
Preceding station	SBB CFF FFS	Following station
Visp towards Basel SBB	EuroCity	Domodossola towards Milano Centrale
Sion towards Genève-Cornavin	EuroCity	Domodossola towards Milano Centrale or Venezia Santa Lucia
Visp towards Basel SBB	IC 6	Terminus
Visp towards Romanshorn	IC 8	Terminus
Visp towards Geneva Airport	IR 90	Terminus
Visp towards Geneva Airport	IR 95	Terminus
Terminus	IR	Domodossola Terminus
Preceding station	DB Fernverkehr	Following station
Visp towards Berlin Ostbahnhof	ICE 12	Terminus
Preceding station	BLS	Following station
Lalden towards Bern	RE1	Terminus
Eggerberg towards Bern	RE1	Iselle di Trasquera towards Domodossola
Eggerberg towards Biel/Bienne	RE11 Weekends only	Terminus
Terminus	RE2	Domodossola Terminus
Visp Terminus	RE2	Domodossola One-way operation
Terminus	RE2	Iselle di Trasquera towards Domodossola
Preceding station	RegionAlps	Following station
Visp towards St-Gingolph	R91	Terminus
Visp towards Monthey	R91	Terminus
Location
- Location within Switzerland Location within Canton of Valais

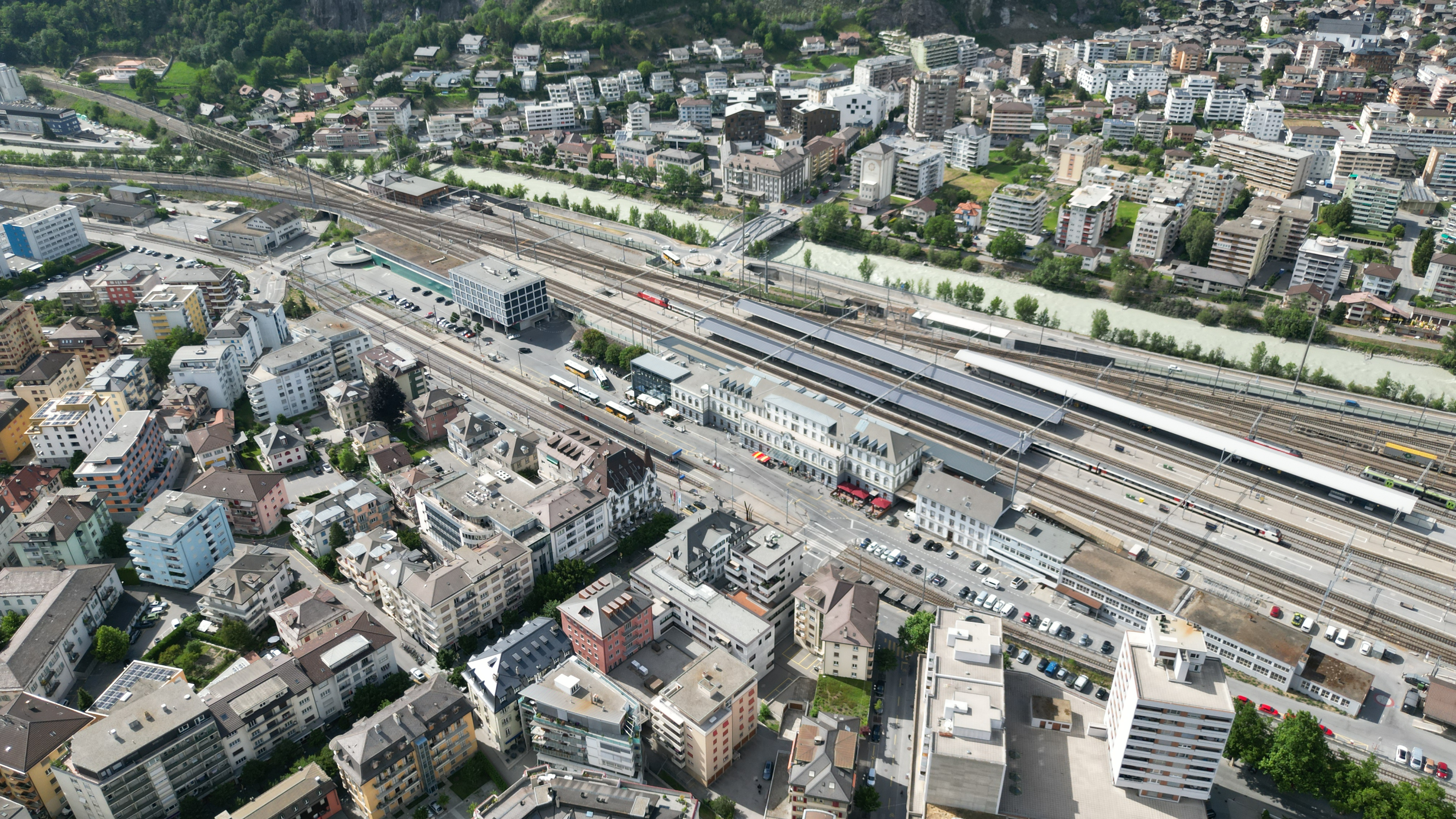
Brig railway station

Brig railway station is an important railway junction in the municipality of Brig-Glis (French: Brigue-Glis), in the Canton of Valais, Switzerland. Opened in 1878, it is adjacent to the northern portal of the Simplon Tunnel and is served by two standard gauge lines. Another two metre gauge lines serve the physically adjacent Brig Bahnhofplatz railway station.

== History ==
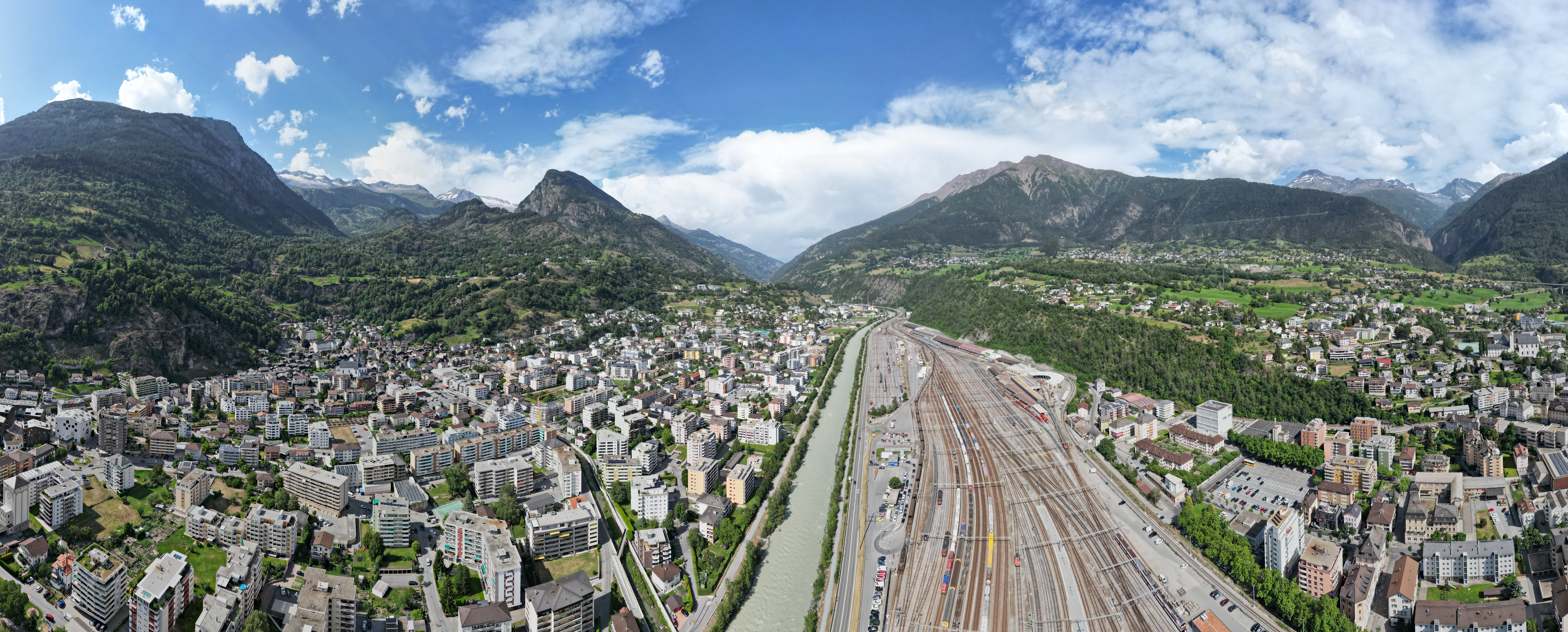
Railway station in Brig-Glis

Service to Brig began on 18 June 1878; it was at that time the eastern terminus of the Simplon Railway. The opening of the Simplon Tunnel in 1906 extended the Simplon Railway southeast to Domodossola, in Italy.

Brig's other standard gauge line, the Lötschberg railway line, opened in 1913. It links Bern with Brig via the Lötschberg Pass, including the Lötschberg Tunnel. In 2007, this line was largely supplanted by the New Railway Link through the Alps (NRLA), connecting (Bern and) Spiez with Visp, near Brig, via the Lötschberg Base Tunnel. Trains travelling along the NRLA line to Visp usually then continue on to Brig via the Simplon line.

== Services ==
As of the December 2024 timetable change, the following services stop at Brig:

- EuroCity/InterCity: trains every two hours to Basel SBB; EuroCity trains continue from Brig to Milano Centrale via Domodossola.
- EuroCity: four trains per day between Genève-Cornavin and Milano Centrale, with one train continuing from Milano Centrale to Venezia Santa Lucia.
- InterCity: trains every two hours to Romanshorn.
- InterRegio:
  - trains every half-hour to Geneva Airport.
  - three trains per day to Domodossola.
- RegioExpress:
  - trains every hour to Bern, with most trains continuing from Brig to Domodossola.
  - daily service on weekends during the high season to Biel/Bienne.
- Regio: half-hourly service to Monthey, with every other train continuing to Saint-Gingolph.

== See also ==
- History of rail transport in Switzerland
- Rail transport in Switzerland
