= Baltschieder =

Place in Valais, Switzerland

- Municipality
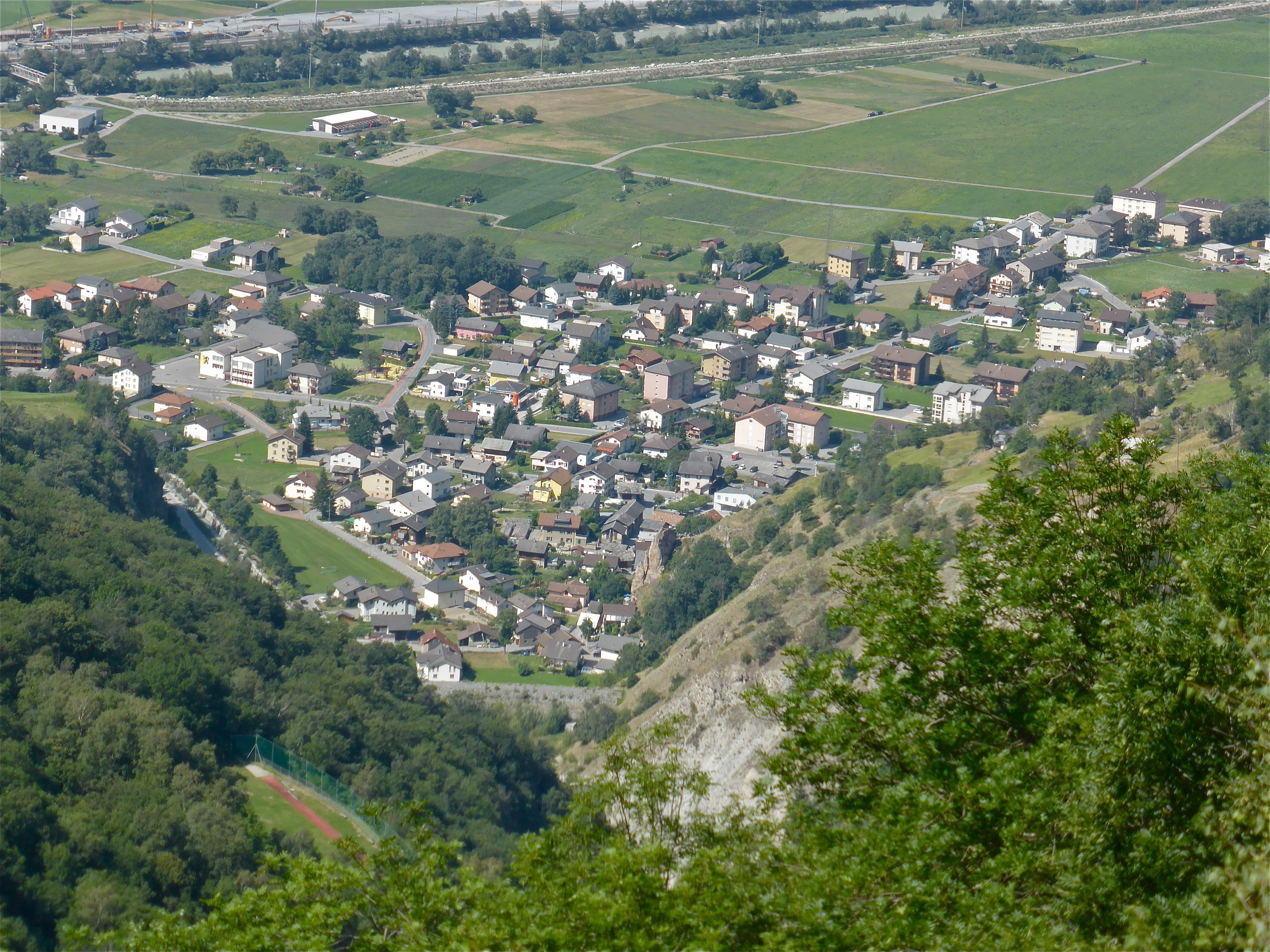

- Flag Coat of arms
- Location of Baltschieder
- Location within Switzerland Location within Canton of Valais
- Coordinates: 46°17′N 7°52′E
- Country: Switzerland
- Canton: Valais
- District: Visp

Government
  - Mayor: Markus Nellen

Area
  - Total: 31.4 km^{2} (12.1 sq mi)
- Elevation: 658 m (2,159 ft)

Population (December 2002)
  - Total: 1,128
  - Density: 35.9/km^{2} (93.0/sq mi)
- Time zone: UTC+01:00 (CET)
  - Summer (DST): UTC+02:00 (CEST)
- Postal code: 3937
- SFOS number: 6281
- ISO 3166 code: CH-VS
- Surrounded by: Ausserberg, Blatten (Lötschen), Eggerberg, Lalden, Mund, Naters, Raron, Visp
- Website: www.baltschieder.ch

Baltschieder (Swiss Standard German pronunciation: [ˈbaltʃiːdər]) is a municipality in the district of Visp in the canton of Valais in Switzerland.

== History ==
Baltschieder is first mentioned in 1224 as Ponczirrum. In 1286 it was mentioned as Balschyedro.

== Geography ==
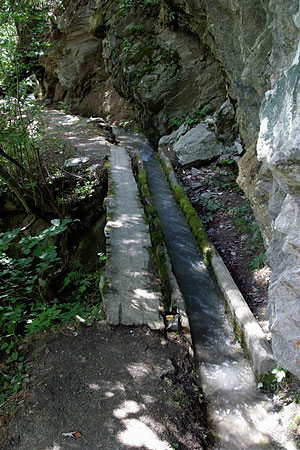
Historic Suone (water chute) in Baltschieder valley

Baltschieder has an area, as of 2011, of 31.4 square kilometers (12.1 mi^{2}). Of this area, 10.7% is used for agricultural purposes, while 3.3% is forested. Of the rest of the land, 1.1% is settled (buildings or roads) and 85.0% is unproductive land.

The municipality is located in the Visp district, at the end of the Baltschieder valley.

The proposed merger of the municipalities of Eggerberg, Ausserberg, Bürchen, Baltschieder, Visp and Visperterminen was rejected by the residents.

== Coat of arms ==
The blazon of the municipal coat of arms is Or, a Lion rampant Sable langued and armed Gules.

== Demographics ==
Baltschieder has a population (as of December 2020) of 1,305. As of 2008, 4.9% of the population are resident foreign nationals. Over the last 10 years (2000–2010) the population has changed at a rate of 9.3%. It has changed at a rate of 3.2% due to migration and at a rate of 6.9% due to births and deaths.

Most of the population (as of 2000) speaks German (1,020 or 97.1%) as their first language, French is the second most common (7 or 0.7%) and Albanian is the third (7 or 0.7%). There are 6 people who speak Italian.

As of 2008, the population was 50.9% male and 49.1% female. The population was made up of 570 Swiss men (47.5% of the population) and 41 (3.4%) non-Swiss men. There were 555 Swiss women (46.3%) and 34 (2.8%) non-Swiss women. Of the population in the municipality, 455 or about 43.3% were born in Baltschieder and lived there in 2000. There were 464 or 44.2% who were born in the same canton, while 79 or 7.5% were born somewhere else in Switzerland, and 44 or 4.2% were born outside of Switzerland.

As of 2000, children and teenagers (0–19 years old) make up 31.6% of the population, while adults (20–64 years old) make up 59.9% and seniors (over 64 years old) make up 8.5%.

As of 2000, there were 434 people who were single and never married in the municipality. There were 552 married individuals, 42 widows or widowers and 22 individuals who are divorced.

As of 2000, there were 377 private households in the municipality, and an average of 2.8 persons per household. There were 75 households that consist of only one person and 40 households with five or more people. In 2000, a total of 370 apartments (99.5% of the total) were permanently occupied, while 2 apartments (0.5%) were seasonally occupied. As of 2009, the construction rate of new housing units was 7.5 new units per 1000 residents. The vacancy rate for the municipality, in 2010, was 0.23%.

The historical population is given in the following chart:

== Politics ==
In the 2007 federal election the most popular party was the CVP which received 58.15% of the vote. The next three most popular parties were the SP (23.11%), the SVP (14.66%) and the FDP (3.03%). In the federal election, a total of 493 votes were cast, and the voter turnout was 58.5%.

In the 2009 Conseil d'État/Staatsrat election a total of 428 votes were cast, of which 11 or about 2.6% were invalid. The voter participation was 49.1%, which is much less than the cantonal average of 54.67%. In the 2007 Swiss Council of States election a total of 493 votes were cast, of which 11 or about 2.2% were invalid. The voter participation was 58.5%, which is similar to the cantonal average of 59.88%.

== Economy ==
As of 2010, Baltschieder had an unemployment rate of 1.4%. As of 2008, there were 26 people employed in the primary economic sector and about 13 businesses involved in this sector. 13 people were employed in the secondary sector and there were 5 businesses in this sector. 50 people were employed in the tertiary sector, with 16 businesses in this sector. There were 490 residents of the municipality who were employed in some capacity, of which females made up 37.8% of the workforce.

In 2008 the total number of full-time equivalent jobs was 60. The number of jobs in the primary sector was 11, all of which were in agriculture. The number of jobs in the secondary sector was 12 of which 11 or (91.7%) were in manufacturing and 1 was in construction. The number of jobs in the tertiary sector was 37. In the tertiary sector; 8 or 21.6% were in wholesale or retail sales or the repair of motor vehicles, 3 or 8.1% were in the movement and storage of goods, 6 or 16.2% were in a hotel or restaurant, 1 was a technical professional or scientist, 10 or 27.0% were in education.

In 2000, there were 29 workers who commuted into the municipality and 421 workers who commuted away. The municipality is a net exporter of workers, with about 14.5 workers leaving the municipality for every one entering. Of the working population, 13.9% used public transportation to get to work, and 62% used a private car.

== Religion ==
From the 2000 census, 952 or 90.7% were Roman Catholic, while 34 or 3.2% belonged to the Swiss Reformed Church. Of the rest of the population, there were 46 individuals (or about 4.38% of the population) who belonged to another Christian church. There were 12 (or about 1.14% of the population) who were Islamic. 8 (or about 0.76% of the population) belonged to no church, are agnostic or atheist, and 21 individuals (or about 2.00% of the population) did not answer the question.

== Education ==
In Baltschieder about 378 or (36.0%) of the population have completed non-mandatory upper secondary education, and 96 or (9.1%) have completed additional higher education (either university or a Fachhochschule). Of the 96 who completed tertiary schooling, 79.2% were Swiss men, 16.7% were Swiss women.

During the 2010–2011 school year there were a total of 125 students in the Baltschieder school system. The education system in the Canton of Valais allows young children to attend one year of non-obligatory Kindergarten. During that school year, there 2 kindergarten classes (KG1 or KG2) and 26 kindergarten students. The canton's school system requires students to attend six years of primary school. In Baltschieder there were a total of 7 classes and 125 students in the primary school. The secondary school program consists of three lower, obligatory years of schooling (orientation classes), followed by three to five years of optional, advanced schools. All the lower and upper secondary students from Baltschieder attend their school in a neighboring municipality.

As of 2000, there were 84 students from Baltschieder who attended schools outside the municipality.
