= Municipalities of the canton of Valais =

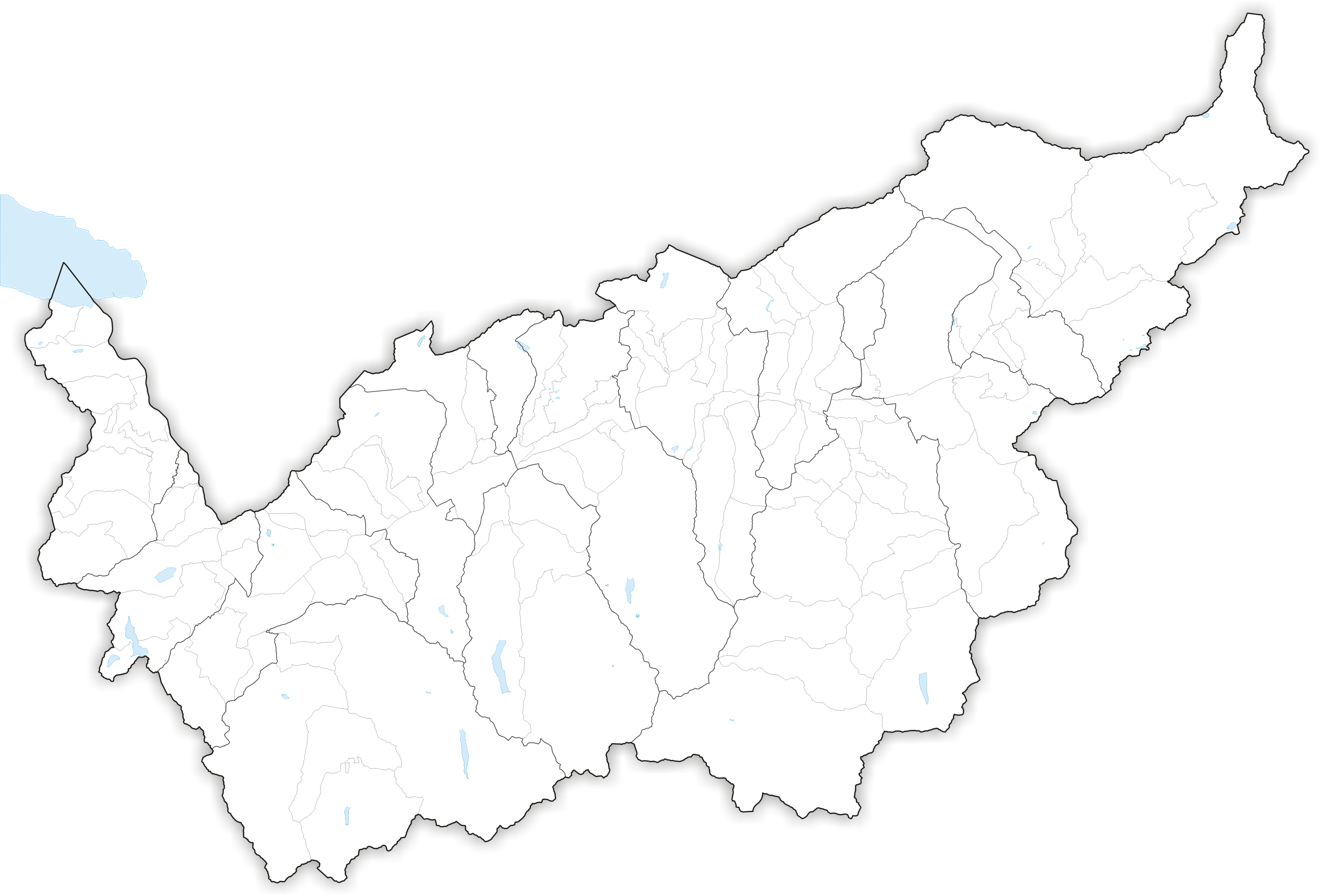
Municipalities in the canton of Wallis

There are 122 municipalities in the canton of Valais, Switzerland (as of January 2021).

== List ==
- Agarn
- Albinen
- Anniviers
- Arbaz
- Ardon
- Ausserberg
- Ayent
- Baltschieder
- Bellwald
- Bettmeralp
- Binn
- Bister
- Bitsch
- Blatten
- Bourg-Saint-Pierre
- Bovernier
- Brig-Glis
- Bürchen
- Chalais
- Chamoson
- Champéry
- Chippis
- Collombey-Muraz
- Collonges
- Conthey
- Crans-Montana
- Dorénaz
- Eggerberg
- Eischoll
- Eisten
- Embd
- Ergisch
- Ernen
- Evionnaz
- Evolène
- Ferden
- Fiesch
- Fieschertal
- Finhaut
- Fully
- Gampel-Bratsch
- Goms
- Grächen
- Grengiols
- Grimisuat
- Grône
- Guttet-Feschel
- Hérémence
- Icogne
- Inden
- Isérables
- Kippel
- Lalden
- Lax
- Lens
- Leuk
- Leukerbad
- Leytron
- Liddes
- Martigny
- Martigny-Combe
- Massongex
- Mont-Noble
- Monthey
- Mörel-Filet
- Naters
- Nendaz
- Niedergesteln
- Oberems
- Obergoms
- Orsières
- Port-Valais
- Randa
- Raron
- Riddes
- Ried-Brig
- Riederalp
- Saas-Almagell
- Saas-Balen
- Saas-Fee
- Saas-Grund
- Saillon
- Saint-Gingolph
- Saint-Léonard
- Saint-Martin (VS)
- Saint-Maurice
- Salgesch
- Salvan
- Savièse
- Saxon
- Sembrancher
- Sierre
- Simplon
- Sion
- St. Niklaus
- Stalden (VS)
- Staldenried
- Steg-Hohtenn
- Täsch
- Termen
- Törbel
- Trient
- Troistorrents
- Turtmann-Unterems
- Unterbäch
- Val de Bagnes
- Val-d'Illiez
- Varen
- Vernayaz
- Vérossaz
- Vétroz
- Vex
- Veysonnaz
- Vionnaz
- Visp
- Visperterminen
- Vouvry
- Wiler (Lötschen)
- Zeneggen
- Zermatt
- Zwischbergen
