= Subdivisions of the canton of Valais =

Territorial organization of the Canton of Valais

The Canton of Valais is subdivided into districts and municipalities.

There is one former district, namely Raron District, which got divided into Westlich Raron District, Östlich Raron District.

== Districts ==
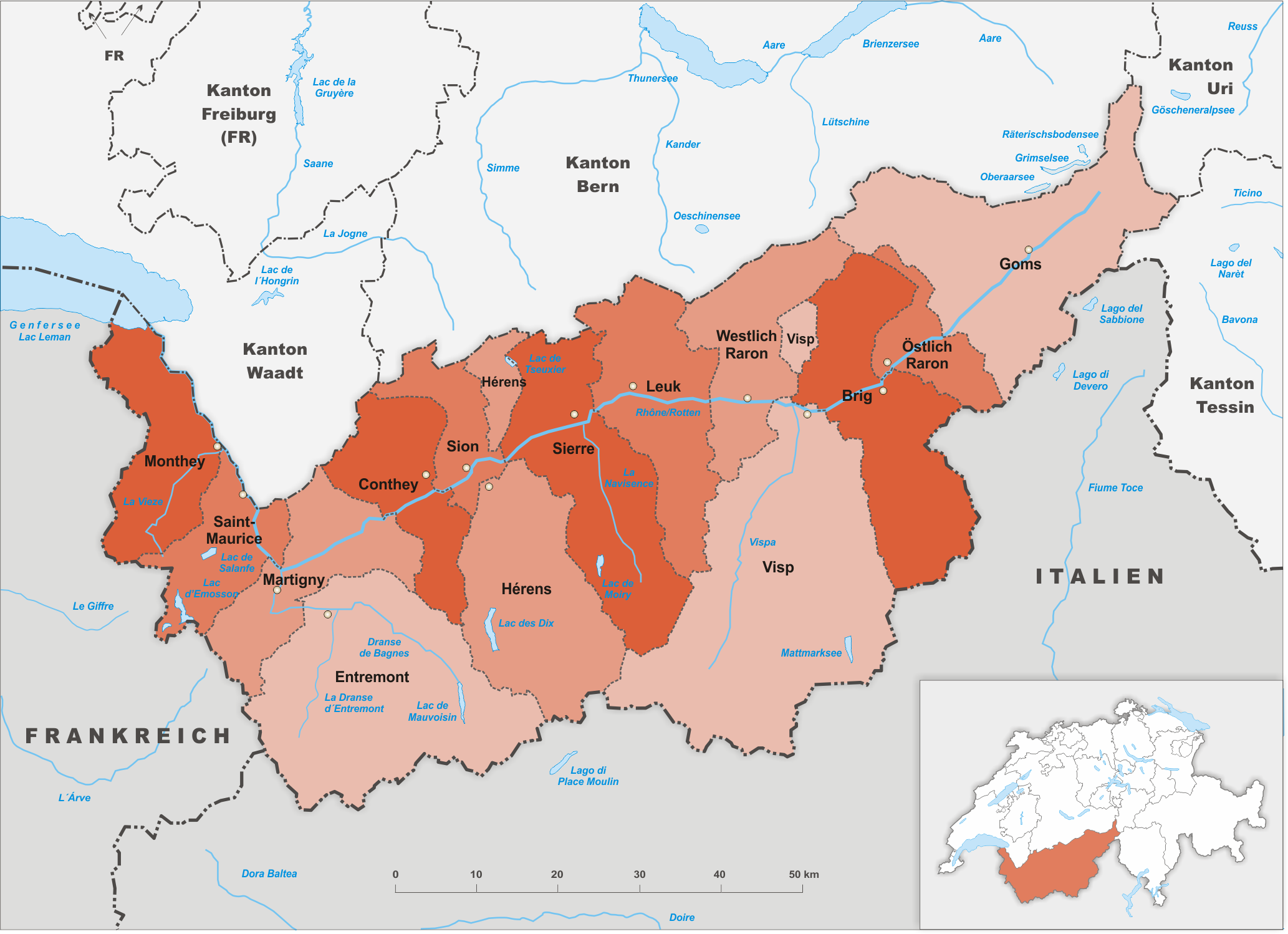
Districts in Valais

Valais is divided into 13 districts, represented by the 13 stars on the coat of arms of Valais:

- Brig with capital Brig-Glis
- Conthey with capital Conthey
- Entremont with capital Sembrancher
- Goms with capital Münster-Geschinen
- Hérens with capital Evolène
- Leuk with capital Leuk
- Martigny with capital Martigny
- Monthey with capital Monthey
- Saint-Maurice with capital Saint-Maurice
- Sierre with capital Sierre
- Sion with capital Sion
- Visp with capital Visp
- District Raron is divided into:

- Östlich Raron with capital Mörel-Filet
- Westlich Raron with capital Raron

== Villages ==
- Mayoux
- Vissoie

== See also ==
- Category:Districts of Valais
- Municipalities of the canton of Valais
