= Constituent Assembly of Valais =

The Constituent Assembly of the Canton of Valais (German: Verfassungsrat des Kantons Wallis) is a body elected on 25 November 2018 to draft a new constitution for the canton of Valais, Switzerland.

After four years of work, the draft constitution was submitted to a popular vote on 3 March 2024 and was rejected by over 68% of voters.

== Background ==
=== Necessity of reform ===
At the beginning of the 2010s, the Constitution of the canton of Valais, dating from 1907, was considered outdated. The Federal Tribunal found that the allocation of seats by proportional representation according to districts violated fundamental political rights. (Note: Some electoral districts have too few seats, and thus a naturally high quorum, making equitable representation of the various political forces difficult.) In response, the Council of State, following the recommendations of a working group, initiated a constitutional reform of political institutions known as R21. This reform aimed to adapt the electoral system and redefine institutional structures. Although approved by popular vote, the reform could not be enacted due to a high number of blank ballots. As a result, the government implemented by decree the provisions related to the election of the Grand Council (bi-proportional system) to ensure compliance with political rights for the 2017 and 2021 elections. (Note: A system of grouping by district results in some voters not directly voting for their representatives.)

=== Referendum and election of the Constituent Assembly ===
In March 2015, a nonpartisan committee launched a signature drive for a popular initiative calling for a total revision of the cantonal Constitution. On July 27, 2016, the committee submitted 7,895 valid signatures, exceeding the required 6,000, to the Cantonal Chancellery. This initiated the process of constitutional revision, making Valais the first canton to begin such a process through a popular initiative rather than through existing institutions.

Under the Constitution, the proposal for a total revision was submitted to a popular vote. Voters were asked whether to approve the principle of a complete revision and whether it should be carried out by the Grand Council or a Constituent Assembly. The Swiss People's Party (UDC) opposed the total revision and, if necessary, supported its implementation by the Grand Council. The Christian Democratic People's Party (PDC) supported the revision but opposed the creation of a Constituent Assembly. The FDP, Socialist Party, Greens, Christian Social Party (PCS), and the Council of State supported a revision by a Constituent Assembly. The vote took place on March 4, 2018: over 72% of voters approved a total revision, and 61% supported the creation of a Constituent Assembly. The Council of State then organized the elections, following the same procedure as for the Grand Council.

Despite initial attempts to form a unified list, each party ultimately submitted its own list under different names. A nonpartisan group, Appel Citoyen (Citizen Appeal), presented "citizen" lists, with candidates selected through an algorithm aimed at ensuring gender parity and regional representation, following an initial online vote. All traditional parties included political newcomers on their lists, in line with their campaign commitments. A total of 645 candidates ran for 130 seats across nearly all districts. (Note: With as many candidates as seats. Traditionally, parties tend to field many candidates roughly corresponding to their electoral strength.)

The campaign focused on institutional reform, the redrawing of regional and district boundaries, the relationship between Church and State—particularly the preamble phrase "In the name of Almighty God!"—and the status of the Upper Valaisan linguistic minority. In the election held on November 25, 2018, the nonpartisan group Appel Citoyen secured 16 seats, reducing the share of traditional parties. Voter turnout was 48%.

=== Establishment and beginning of work ===
The inaugural session was held on December 17, 2018, in the chamber of the Valais Grand Council. Former judge Jean Zermatten was elected president of the provisional bureau, tasked with preparing the assembly's regulations.

In April, the assembly adopted its rules of procedure and elected a general-secretary. At the plenary session of June 5, 2019, it elected the presidential board, with a rotating annual presidency, and established thematic commissions. On October 3, the Constituent Assembly held a session in Visp, where it adopted a communication and citizen participation plan, including citizen workshops and a digital proposal platform. The total budget was estimated at over six million francs, with more than one million allocated for the first year. On December 3, during a plenary session in Monthey, the assembly elected two new members to the presidential board, reviewed the citizen workshops, and held discussions with former members of other cantonal constituent assemblies. By the end of the year, five members had resigned (three from the UDC, one from the PDC, and one from the VLR), and one member had died.

=== Review of the principles ===
In spring 2020, the thematic commissions published their working reports for examination by the Assembly in plenary session. Proposals included the right to vote at age 16 and for foreigners, a cantonal minimum wage, and a fundamental right to digital anonymity. Two sessions per month were scheduled for April, May, and June 2020, but were postponed by the Bureau due to the coronavirus pandemic.

The first session was held on September 3 and 4 in Brig. The plenary Assembly deliberated on the principles and the overall direction of the work. The proposals of Commission 1, which largely maintained the status quo, were accepted. The fundamental rights proposed by Commission 2 were deemed unrealistic and were entirely replaced by a motion.

=== Final text ===
On April 25, 2023, the Constituent Assembly adopted the final text by 87 votes to 40. An alternative version, retaining the overall text but excluding political rights at the municipal level for individuals of foreign nationality, was also approved by a vote of 87 to 29, with 7 abstentions. On May 17, 2023, the draft Constitution was submitted to the Council of State by members of the Presidential College.

The Valais Council of State scheduled the referendum for March 3, 2024.

== Composition ==
The Constituent Assembly comprised the same number of deputies and the same geographical distribution as the Valais Grand Council, but did not include substitute deputies. The "difference" column indicates the variation in seats compared to the 2017 Grand Council legislature. Out of 217,950 registered voters, 106,590 participated, resulting in a turnout of 48.9%.

To reflect openness to candidates without prior political experience, parties modified the names of their lists. The table reflects the alliances between the German-speaking lists from Upper Valais and the French-speaking lists from Lower Valais.

=== Leadership ===
Two bodies lead the Constituent Assembly:

- The Presidential College, responsible in particular for ensuring compliance with the rules, administrative matters, and relations with other authorities. It is composed of four members with gender and regional language parity, elected for a maximum of two years according to a type of magic formula. Among its members, it elects a plenary president and a coordinator responsible for convening and leading the College. During the proceedings, the Presidential College had ten members:
  - Sabine Fournier (Greens – 2019)
  - Lukas Jäger (SVPO – 2019)
  - Yann Roduit (The Centre – 2019 to 2020)
  - Émilie Praz (Citizen Appeal – 2019 to 2020)
  - Felix Ruppen (Die Mitte – 2020 to 2021)
  - Gabrielle Barras (UDC – 2020 to 2021)
  - Géraldine Gianadda (VLR – 2021 to 2023)
  - Gaël Bourgeois (Socialist Party – 2021 to 2023)
  - Jenny Voeffray (The Centre – 2022 to 2023)
  - Kurt Regotz (Neo – 2022 to 2023)
- The Bureau, responsible for the overall organization of the Constituent Assembly. It is composed of 13 members appointed by the elected parties and movements.

=== Commissions ===
The deputies are divided into ten thematic commissions of 13 members each, tasked with addressing the various components of the future constitution:

1. General provisions, social cohesion, preamble, Church/State relations, and final provisions
2. Fundamental rights, social rights, and civil society
3. Political rights
4. Tasks of the State I: Principles, finance, and economic development
5. Tasks of the State II: Spatial planning and natural resources
6. Tasks of the State III: Social tasks and other state responsibilities
7. Cantonal authorities I – General provisions and Grand Council
8. Cantonal authorities II – Council of State, administration, and prefects
9. Cantonal authorities III – Judiciary
10. Municipalities and territorial organization

There are also three institutional commissions:

1. The Coordination Commission, composed of the presidents of the College and the thematic commissions, ensures the coherence of the work.
2. The Citizen Participation Commission, responsible for involving civil society in the drafting process.
3. The Drafting Commission, which checks the substance and form of the project.

== Outcome ==
The decree establishing the Constituent Assembly was repealed on February 5, 2025, without a final dissolution session. As a result, the Assembly was never formally dissolved.

== See also ==
- Valais
- Federal Supreme Court of Switzerland
- Grand Council of Valais
- Biproportional apportionment
