= Hohtenn =

- Former municipality
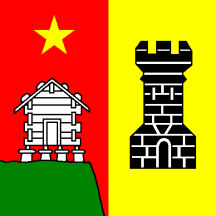
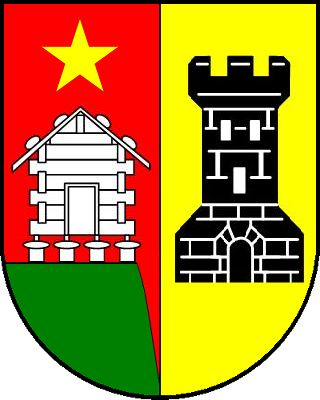
- Flag Coat of arms
- Location of Hohtenn
- Location within Switzerland Location within Canton of Valais
- Coordinates: 46°19′N 7°46′E
- Country: Switzerland
- Canton: Valais
- District: Raron

Area
  - Total: 7.06 km^{2} (2.73 sq mi)
- Elevation: 825 m (2,707 ft)

Population (December 2002)
  - Total: 233
  - Density: 33.0/km^{2} (85.5/sq mi)
- Time zone: UTC+01:00 (CET)
  - Summer (DST): UTC+02:00 (CEST)
- Postal code: 3949
- SFOS number: 6196
- ISO 3166 code: CH-VS
- Surrounded by: Niedergesteln, Steg
- Website: SFSO statistics

Hohtenn is a village and former municipality in the district of Raron in the canton of Valais in Switzerland. Since 1 January 2009, it has been part of the municipality of Steg-Hohtenn.

Hohtenn railway station, on the Lötschberg line, lies just over 1 kilometre (0.62 mi) from, and 253 metres (830 ft) above, the village of Hohtenn. It is served by trains to Bern, Thun and Brig. Additionally, a PostAuto bus service links Hohtenn village to Steg.
