= Mörel, Switzerland =

Mörel
- Former municipality
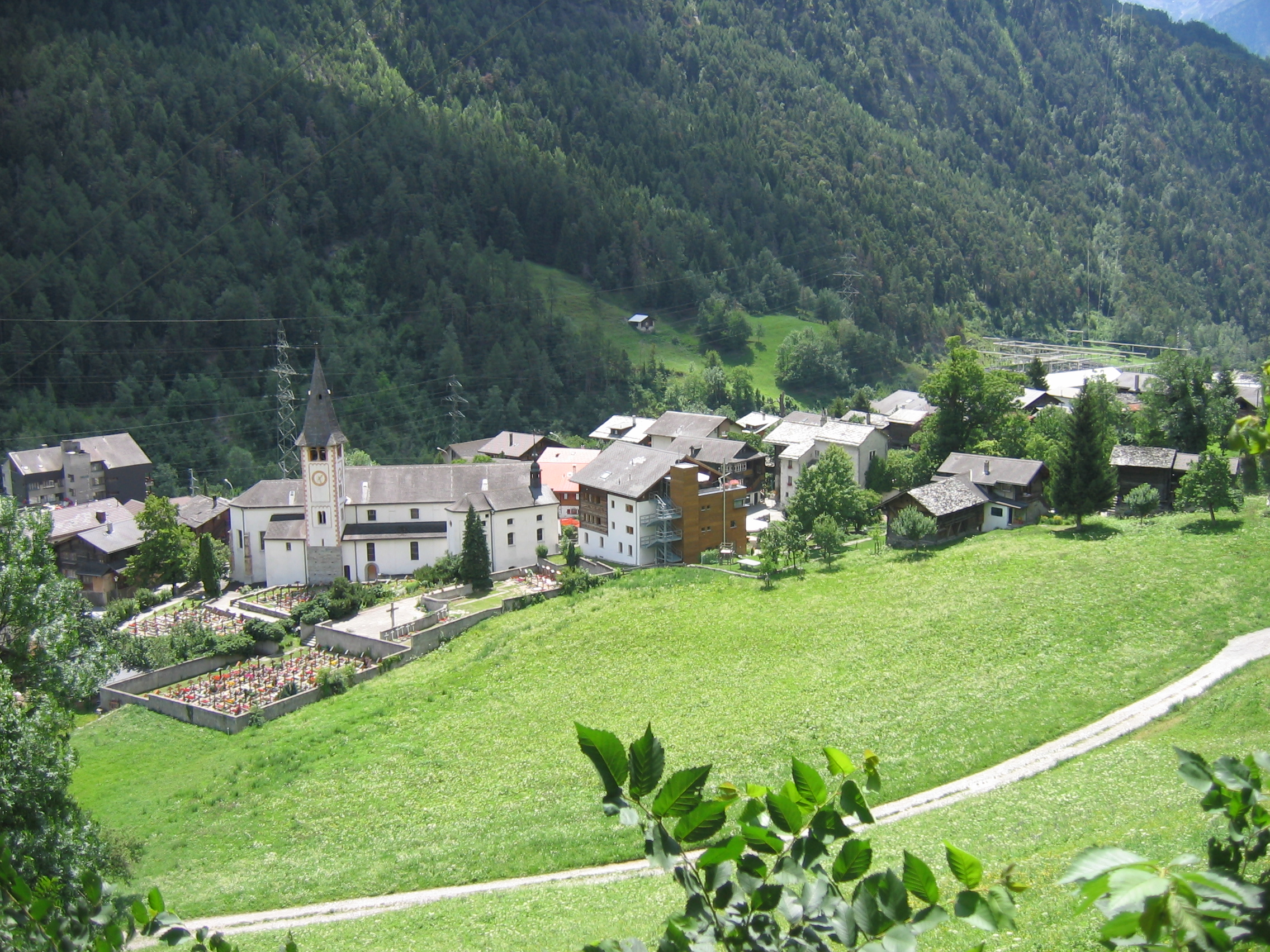

- Flag Coat of arms
- Location of Mörel
- Location within Switzerland Location within Canton of Valais
- Coordinates: 46°21′N 8°2′E
- Country: Switzerland
- Canton: Valais
- District: Östlich Raron

Area
  - Total: 1.2 km^{2} (0.46 sq mi)
- Elevation: 759 m (2,490 ft)

Population (December 2008)
  - Total: 450
  - Density: 380/km^{2} (970/sq mi)
- Time zone: UTC+01:00 (CET)
  - Summer (DST): UTC+02:00 (CEST)
- Postal code: 3983
- SFOS number: 6179
- ISO 3166 code: CH-VS
- Surrounded by: Filet, Riederalp, Termen
- Website: moerel.ch

Mörel (Swiss Standard German pronunciation: [ˈmøːrəl]) is a former municipality in Östlich Raron in the canton of Valais in Switzerland. In 2009 Mörel merged with Filet into the municipality of Mörel-Filet.

== History ==
Mörel is first mentioned in 1203 as Morgi.

== Geography ==
Mörel was the capital of the Östlich Raron district until the merger into Mörel-Filet. It is located in a small bend on the right bank of the Rhone river.

== Coat of arms ==
The blazon of the village coat of arms is Gules, an Ox head guardant Sable holding two Ears of grain Or in mouth.

== Demographics ==
Mörel has a population (as of December 2008) of 450.

Most of the population (as of 2000) speaks German (500 or 95.4%) as their first language, Serbo-Croatian is the second most common (7 or 1.3%) and French is the third (3 or 0.6%). There is 1 person who speaks Italian.

As of 2008, the population was made up of 450 Swiss citizens and 52 non-citizen residents (10.36% of the population). Of the population in the village, 187 or about 35.7% were born in Mörel and lived there in 2000. There were 208 or 39.7% who were born in the same canton, while 56 or 10.7% were born somewhere else in Switzerland, and 57 or 10.9% were born outside of Switzerland.

As of 2000, there were 193 people who were single and never married in the village. There were 273 married individuals, 34 widows or widowers and 24 individuals who are divorced.

There were 73 households that consist of only one person and 14 households with five or more people. In 2000, a total of 215 apartments (51.2% of the total) were permanently occupied, while 175 apartments (41.7%) were seasonally occupied and 30 apartments (7.1%) were empty.

The historical population is given in the following chart:

== Politics ==
In the 2007 federal election the most popular party was the CVP which received 53.02% of the vote. The next three most popular parties were the FDP (18.13%), the SVP (15.05%) and the SP (11.82%). In the federal election, a total of 288 votes were cast, and the voter turnout was 71.6%.

== Economy ==
There were 242 residents of the village who were employed in some capacity, of which females made up 40.1% of the workforce.

In 2008 the total number of full-time equivalent jobs was 247. The number of jobs in the primary sector was 5, all of which were in agriculture. The number of jobs in the secondary sector was 44 of which 2 or (4.5%) were in manufacturing and 38 (86.4%) were in construction. The number of jobs in the tertiary sector was 198. In the tertiary sector; 24 or 12.1% were in the sale or repair of motor vehicles, 72 or 36.4% were in the movement and storage of goods, 46 or 23.2% were in a hotel or restaurant, 2 or 1.0% were the insurance or financial industry, 4 or 2.0% were technical professionals or scientists, 19 or 9.6% were in education and 21 or 10.6% were in health care.

In 2000, there were 163 workers who commuted into the village and 139 workers who commuted away. The village is a net importer of workers, with about 1.2 workers entering the village for every one leaving. About 3.7% of the workforce coming into Mörel are coming from outside Switzerland.

== Religion ==
From the 2000 census, 443 or 84.5% were Roman Catholic, while 24 or 4.6% belonged to the Swiss Reformed Church. Of the rest of the population, there were 5 members of an Orthodox church (or about 0.95% of the population), there were 2 individuals (or about 0.38% of the population) who belonged to the Christian Catholic Church, and there were 6 individuals (or about 1.15% of the population) who belonged to another Christian church. There were 10 (or about 1.91% of the population) who were Islamic. 14 (or about 2.67% of the population) belonged to no church, are agnostic or atheist, and 23 individuals (or about 4.39% of the population) did not answer the question.

== Education ==
In Mörel about 188 or (35.9%) of the population have completed non-mandatory upper secondary education, and 50 or (9.5%) have completed additional higher education (either university or a Fachhochschule). Of the 50 who completed tertiary schooling, 70.0% were Swiss men, 18.0% were Swiss women.

During the 2010–2011 school year there were a total of 164 students in the Mörel school system. The education system in the Canton of Valais allows young children to attend one year of non-obligatory Kindergarten. During that school year, there was one kindergarten class (KG1 or KG2) and 15 kindergarten students. The canton's school system requires students to attend six years of primary school. In Mörel there were a total of 4 classes and 64 students in the primary school. The secondary school program consists of three lower, obligatory years of schooling (orientation classes), followed by three to five years of optional, advanced schools. There were 100 lower secondary students who attended school in Mörel. All the upper secondary students attended school in another municipality.

As of 2000, there were 60 students in Mörel who came from another village, while 41 residents attended schools outside the village.

Mörel is home to the Regionalbibliothek library. It was open a total of 121 days with average of 6 hours per week during that year.
