= Steg, Valais =

Steg
- Former municipality
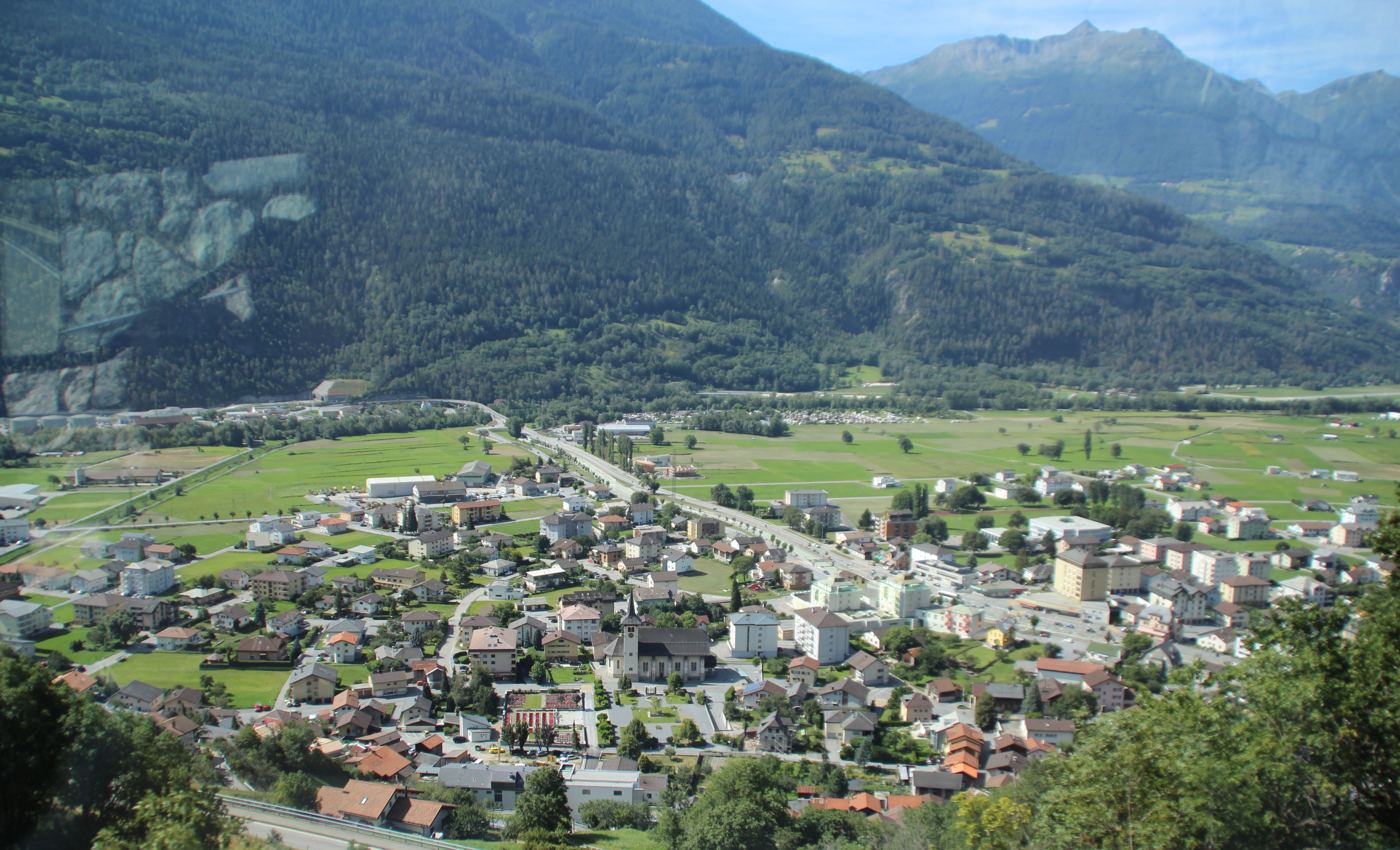

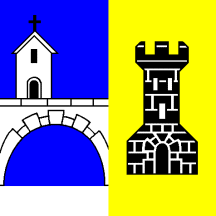
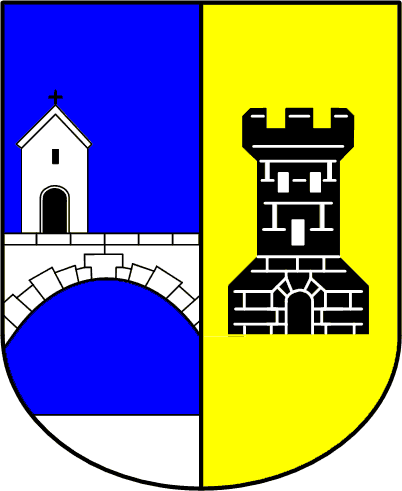
- Flag Coat of arms
- Location of Steg
- Location within Switzerland Location within Canton of Valais
- Coordinates: 46°17′N 7°47′E
- Country: Switzerland
- Canton: Valais
- District: Raron

Area
  - Total: 7.15 km^{2} (2.76 sq mi)
- Elevation: 640 m (2,100 ft)

Population (December 2002)
  - Total: 1,404
  - Density: 196/km^{2} (509/sq mi)
- Time zone: UTC+01:00 (CET)
  - Summer (DST): UTC+02:00 (CEST)
- Postal code: 3940
- SFOS number: 6200
- ISO 3166 code: CH-VS
- Surrounded by: Ferden, Gampel, Hohtenn, Niedergesteln, Turtmann
- Website: www.gemeinde-steg.ch

Steg is a village and former municipality in the district of Raron in the canton of Valais in Switzerland. Since 1 January 2009, Steg has been part of the enlarged municipality of Steg-Hohtenn.

The village of Steg is located at the southern entrance to the Lötschental or Lötschen valley. The western border of the village is the Lonza river, which is also the district border and the border with the neighboring village of Gampel.
