= Filet, Switzerland =

Filet
- Former municipality
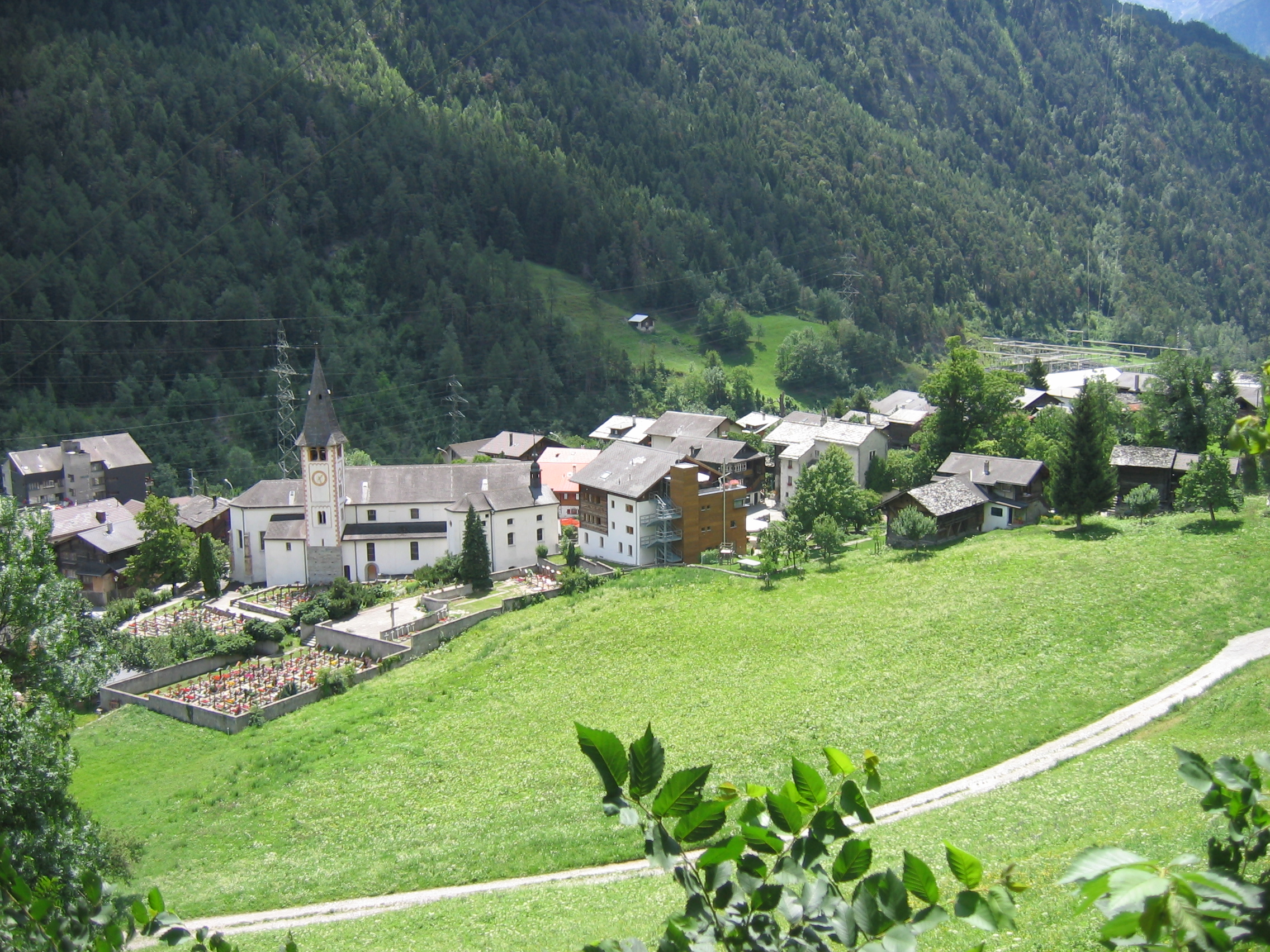

- Flag Coat of arms
- Location of Filet
- Location within Switzerland Location within Canton of Valais
- Coordinates: 46°21′N 8°3′E
- Country: Switzerland
- Canton: Valais
- District: Raron

Area
  - Total: 7.2 km^{2} (2.8 sq mi)
- Elevation: 757 m (2,484 ft)

Population (December 2008)
  - Total: 151
  - Density: 21/km^{2} (54/sq mi)
- Time zone: UTC+01:00 (CET)
  - Summer (DST): UTC+02:00 (CEST)
- Postal code: 3983
- SFOS number: 6174
- ISO 3166 code: CH-VS
- Surrounded by: Betten, Bister, Grengiols, Mörel, Riederalp, Termen
- Twin towns: Oftringen (Switzerland)
- Website: www.gemeinde-filet.ch

Filet is a former municipality in the district of Raron in the canton of Valais in Switzerland. In 2009 Filet merged with Mörel into the municipality of Mörel-Filet.

== History ==
Throughout the Middle Ages Filet was known as Gifrisch. It was first mentioned in 1374 as Gifris.

== Coat of arms ==
The blazon of the village coat of arms is Divided by a Bar wavy Argent, chief Azure a Mullet of Five Argent and base Gules an Oxen head guardant having two grain ears Or in mouth.

== Demographics ==
Filet has a population (as of December 2008) of 151.

Most of the population (as of 2000) speaks German (142 or 93.4%) as their first language, Dutch is the second most common (3 or 2.0%) and Serbo-Croatian is the third (3 or 2.0%). There are 2 people who speak French.

As of 2008, the population was made up of 151 Swiss citizens and 21 non-citizen residents (12.21% of the population). Of the population in the village, 34 or about 22.4% were born in Filet and lived there in 2000. There were 68 or 44.7% who were born in the same canton, while 29 or 19.1% were born somewhere else in Switzerland, and 15 or 9.9% were born outside of Switzerland.

As of 2000, there were 55 people who were single and never married in the village. There were 82 married individuals, 8 widows or widowers and 7 individuals who are divorced.

There were 17 households that consist of only one person and 2 households with five or more people. In 2000, a total of 61 apartments (55.5% of the total) were permanently occupied, while 40 apartments (36.4%) were seasonally occupied and 9 apartments (8.2%) were empty.

The historical population is given in the following chart:

== Politics ==
In the 2007 federal election the most popular party was the CVP which received 51.08% of the vote. The next three most popular parties were the SP (19.4%), the SVP (16.42%) and the FDP (11.77%). In the federal election, a total of 90 votes were cast, and the voter turnout was 78.3%.

== Economy ==
There were 68 residents of the village who were employed in some capacity, of which females made up 36.8% of the workforce. In 2008 the total number of full-time equivalent jobs was 33. The number of jobs in the primary sector was 2, all of which were in agriculture. The number of jobs in the secondary sector was 14 of which 3 or (21.4%) were in manufacturing and 11 (78.6%) were in construction. The number of jobs in the tertiary sector was 17. In the tertiary sector; 13 or 76.5% were in the sale or repair of motor vehicles and 3 or 17.6% were in a hotel or restaurant.

In 2000, there were 21 workers who commuted into the village and 57 workers who commuted away. The village is a net exporter of workers, with about 2.7 workers leaving the village for every one entering.

== Religion ==
From the 2000 census, 126 or 82.9% were Roman Catholic, while 13 or 8.6% belonged to the Swiss Reformed Church. Of the rest of the population, there was 1 member of an Orthodox church. There was 1 individual who was Islamic. 4 (or about 2.63% of the population) belonged to no church, are agnostic or atheist, and 7 individuals (or about 4.61% of the population) did not answer the question.

== Education ==
In Filet about 61 or (40.1%) of the population have completed non-mandatory upper secondary education, and 15 or (9.9%) have completed additional higher education (either university or a Fachhochschule). Of the 15 who completed tertiary schooling, 53.3% were Swiss men, 20.0% were Swiss women.

As of 2000, there were 19 students from Filet who attended schools outside the village.
