= Bister =

Bister may refer to:

- Bister, Switzerland, a village in the canton of Valais
- Bistre, a pigment and color
- Bicester, Oxfordshire, United Kingdom
- Bister, "abrupt", "stringent" or "austere" in Swedish
- Bister, "bed" in the Urdu language
- Bister, a Belgian/French condiment company
