= Östlich Raron =

Coordinates: 46°18′N 8°48′E

Östlich Raron Bezirk Östlich Raron
- District
- Flag Coat of arms
- Country: Switzerland
- Canton: Valais
- Capital: Mörel-Filet

Area
  - Total: 127.2 km^{2} (49.1 sq mi)

Population (2020)
  - Total: 3,085
  - Density: 24.25/km^{2} (62.82/sq mi)
- Time zone: UTC+1 (CET)
  - Summer (DST): UTC+2 (CEST)
- Municipalities: 6

The district of Östlich Raron (fr. District de Rarogne oriental) is an administrative district in the canton of Valais, Switzerland. The districts of Östlich Raron and Westlich Raron share a single Community Identification Number of SFOS number (2309). The district of Östlich Raron has a population of 3,085, while the Raron District has a population of 11,095 (as of 31 December 2020).

== Municipalities ==
It includes the following municipalities:

Municipality	Population (31 December 2020)	Area km^{2}
Bettmeralp	452	28.79
Bister	34	5.84
Bitsch	1,035	4.02
Grengiols	431	58.46
Mörel-Filet	707	8.44
Riederalp	438	21.04
Total	3,085	127.16

== Coat of arms ==
The blazon of the district coat of arms is Gules a vine eradicated Vert rooted Maroon and fructed Or.

== Demographics ==
Raron has a population (as of December 2020) of 11,095. Most of the population (as of 2000) speaks German (9,979 or 96.1%) as their first language, Albanian is the second most common (89 or 0.9%), and French is the third (88 or 0.8%). There are 45 people who speak Italian and 2 people who speak Romansh.

Of the population in the entire district 5,957 or about 57.4% were born in Raron and lived there in 2000. There were 2,694 or 26.0% who were born in the same canton, while 858 or 8.3% were born somewhere else in Switzerland, and 614 or 5.9% were born outside of Switzerland. As of 2000, there were 4,317 people who were single and never married in the district. There were 5,217 married individuals, 590 widows or widowers and 256 individuals who are divorced.

There were 1,000 households that consist of only one person and 326 households with five or more people. Out of a total of 4,035 households that answered this question, 24.8% were households made up of just one person and there were 75 adults who lived with their parents. Of the rest of the households, there are 1,020 married couples without children, 1,537 married couples with children. There were 178 single parents with a child or children. There were 91 households that were made up of unrelated people and 134 households that were made up of some sort of institution or another collective housing.

The historical population for the entire district is given in the following chart:

== Mergers and name changes ==
On 1 November 2003 the former municipalities of Goppisberg, Greich and Ried-Mörel merged to form the new municipality of Riederalp.

On 1 January 2009 the former municipalities of Filet and Mörel merged to form the new municipality of Mörel-Filet, and the former municipalities of Steg and Hohtenn merged to form the new municipality of Steg-Hohtenn.

On 1 January 2014 the former municipalities of Betten and Martisberg merged into the municipality of Bettmeralp.

== Politics ==
In the 2007 federal election the most popular party was the CVP which received 68.84% of the vote in the entire district. The next three most popular parties were the SVP (14.71%), the SP (10.53%) and the FDP (3.9%). In the federal election, a total of 5,316 votes were cast, and the voter turnout was 63.4%.

In the 2009 Conseil d'État/Staatsrat election a total of 1,318 votes were cast in Östlich Raron, of which 112 or about 8.5% were invalid. The voter participation was 59.1%, which is similar to the cantonal average of 54.67%. In the 2007 Swiss Council of States election a total of 1,354 votes were cast in Östlich Raron, of which 51 or about 3.8% were invalid. The voter participation was 60.0%, which is similar to the cantonal average of 59.88%.

== Religion ==
From the 2000 census, in the entire district, 9,288 or 89.5% were Roman Catholic, while 391 or 3.8% belonged to the Swiss Reformed Church. Of the rest of the population, there were 65 members of an Orthodox church (or about 0.63% of the population), there were 2 individuals (or about 0.02% of the population) who belonged to the Christian Catholic Church, and there were 61 individuals (or about 0.59% of the population) who belonged to another Christian church. There was 1 individual who was Jewish, and 160 (or about 1.54% of the population) who were Islamic. There were 6 individuals who were Buddhist, 4 individuals who were Hindu and 1 individual who belonged to another church. 148 (or about 1.43% of the population) belonged to no church, are agnostic or atheist, and 283 individuals (or about 2.73% of the population) did not answer the question.

== Education ==
In the entire Raron district about 3,941 or (38.0%) of the population have completed non-mandatory upper secondary education, and 636 or (6.1%) have completed additional higher education (either University or a Fachhochschule). Of the 636 who completed tertiary schooling, 76.6% were Swiss men, 15.9% were Swiss women, 4.4% were non-Swiss men and 3.1% were non-Swiss women.
