= Termen =

- Municipality
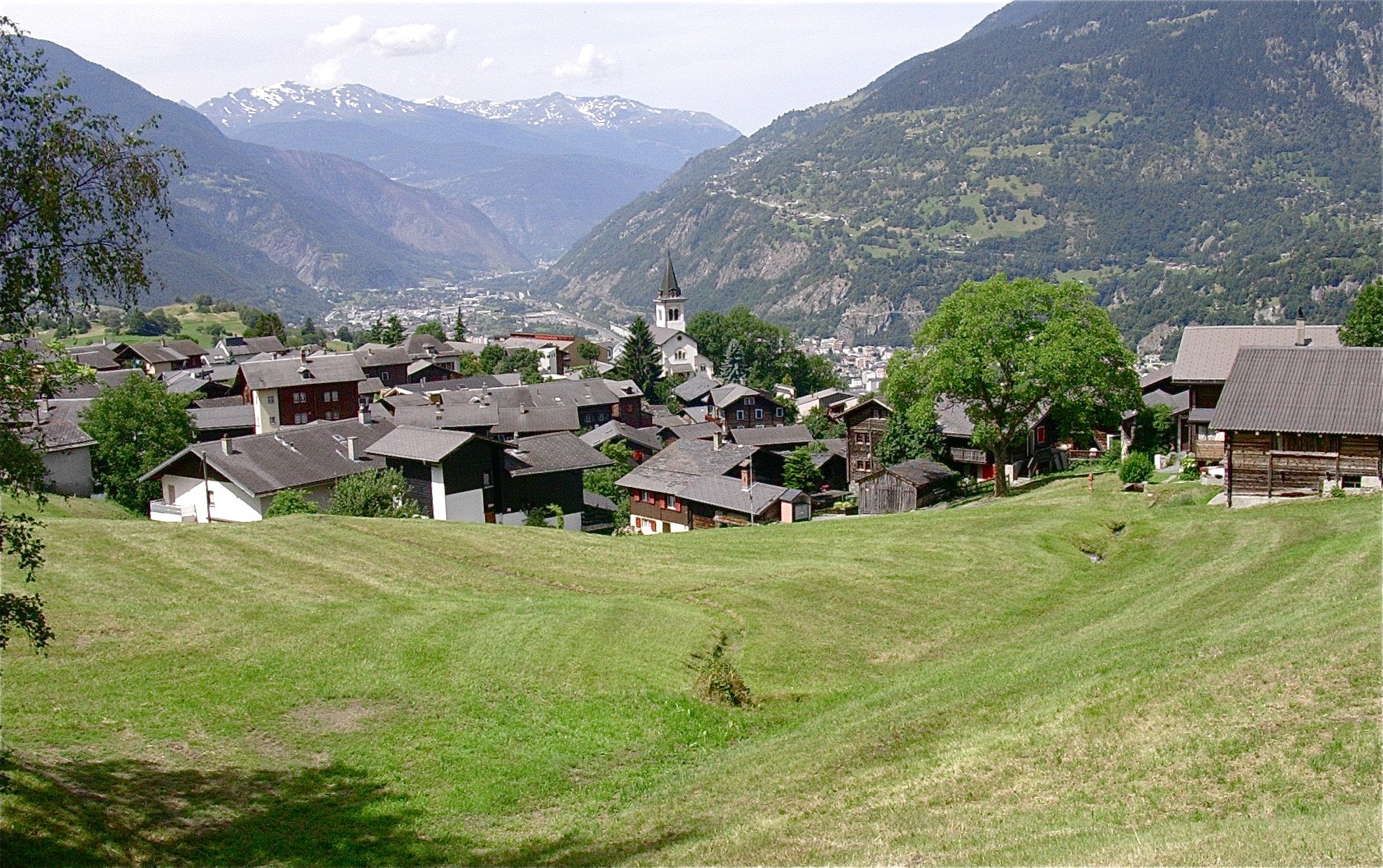

- Flag Coat of arms
- Location of Termen
- Location within Switzerland Location within Canton of Valais
- Coordinates: 46°19′N 8°1′E
- Country: Switzerland
- Canton: Valais
- District: Brig

Government
  - Mayor: Stefan Luggen

Area
  - Total: 18.7 km^{2} (7.2 sq mi)
- Elevation: 927 m (3,041 ft)

Population (December 2002)
  - Total: 787
  - Density: 42.1/km^{2} (109/sq mi)
- Time zone: UTC+01:00 (CET)
  - Summer (DST): UTC+02:00 (CEST)
- Postal code: 3912
- SFOS number: 6010
- ISO 3166 code: CH-VS
- Surrounded by: Bister, Bitsch, Brig-Glis, Filet, Grengiols, Mörel, Naters, Ried-Brig, Riederalp
- Website: www.termen.ch

Termen is a municipality in the district of Brig in the canton of Valais in Switzerland.

== History ==
Termen is first mentioned in 1201 as Terman.

== Geography ==
Termen has an area, as of 2011, of 18.8 square kilometers (7.3 mi^{2}). Of this area, 42.2% is used for agricultural purposes, while 27.2% is forested. Of the rest of the land, 3.3% is settled (buildings or roads) and 27.4% is unproductive land.

The municipality is located on a high plateau to the east of Brig. It consists of the village of Termen, the hamlets of Hasel and z'Matt and the ski resort of Rosswald.

== Coat of arms ==
The blazon of the municipal coat of arms is Argent, two Swords Sable in saltire.

== Demographics ==
Termen has a population (as of December 2020) of 1,021. As of 2008, 6.8% of the population are resident foreign nationals. Over the last 10 years (1999–2009 ) the population has changed at a rate of 5.8%. It has changed at a rate of 2.4% due to migration and at a rate of 1.7% due to births and deaths.

Most of the population (as of 2000) speaks German (743 or 95.1%) as their first language, Albanian is the second most common (11 or 1.4%) and French is the third (10 or 1.3%). There are 3 people who speak Italian and 1 person who speaks Romansh.

As of 2008, the gender distribution of the population was 50.2% male and 49.8% female. The population was made up of 410 Swiss men (46.9% of the population) and 29 (3.3%) non-Swiss men. There were 408 Swiss women (46.6%) and 28 (3.2%) non-Swiss women. Of the population in the municipality 370 or about 47.4% were born in Termen and lived there in 2000. There were 255 or 32.7% who were born in the same canton, while 84 or 10.8% were born somewhere else in Switzerland, and 62 or 7.9% were born outside of Switzerland.

The age distribution of the population (as of 2000) is children and teenagers (0–19 years old) make up 26.8% of the population, while adults (20–64 years old) make up 59.7% and seniors (over 64 years old) make up 13.6%.

As of 2000, there were 333 people who were single and never married in the municipality. There were 406 married individuals, 33 widows or widowers and 9 individuals who are divorced.

As of 2000, there were 284 private households in the municipality, and an average of 2.7 persons per household. There were 60 households that consist of only one person and 28 households with five or more people. Out of a total of 289 households that answered this question, 20.8% were households made up of just one person and there were 3 adults who lived with their parents. Of the rest of the households, there are 74 married couples without children, 133 married couples with children There were 10 single parents with a child or children. There were 4 households that were made up of unrelated people and 5 households that were made up of some sort of institution or another collective housing.

In 2000, there were 241 single family homes (or 60.9% of the total) out of a total of 396 inhabited buildings. There were 123 multi-family buildings (31.1%), along with 16 multi-purpose buildings that were mostly used for housing (4.0%) and 16 other use buildings (commercial or industrial) that also had some housing (4.0%).

In 2000, a total of 274 apartments (48.0% of the total) were permanently occupied, while 262 apartments (45.9%) were seasonally occupied and 35 apartments (6.1%) were empty. As of 2009, the construction rate of new housing units was 10.3 new units per 1000 residents.

The historical population is given in the following chart:

== Politics ==
In the 2007 federal election the most popular party was the CVP which received 66.67% of the vote. The next three most popular parties were the SVP (15.6%), the SP (12.75%) and the FDP (3.05%). In the federal election, a total of 382 votes were cast, and the voter turnout was 61.4%. In the 2009 Conseil d'État/Staatsrat election a total of 382 votes were cast, of which 27 or about 7.1% were invalid. The voter participation was 59.7%, which is much more than the cantonal average of 54.67%. In the 2007 Swiss Council of States election a total of 382 votes were cast, of which 15 or about 3.9% were invalid. The voter participation was 61.8%, which is similar to the cantonal average of 59.88%.

== Economy ==
As of 2010, Termen had an unemployment rate of 0.8%. As of 2008, there were 48 people employed in the primary economic sector and about 25 businesses involved in this sector. 10 people were employed in the secondary sector and there were 2 businesses in this sector. 38 people were employed in the tertiary sector, with 15 businesses in this sector. There were 345 residents of the municipality who were employed in some capacity, of which females made up 36.8% of the workforce.

In 2008, the total number of full-time equivalent jobs was 56. The number of jobs in the primary sector was 15, all of which were in agriculture. The number of jobs in the secondary sector was 10 of which 9 or (90.0%) were in manufacturing and 1 was in construction. The number of jobs in the tertiary sector was 31. In the tertiary sector; 4 or 12.9% were in wholesale or retail sales or the repair of motor vehicles, 14 or 45.2% were in a hotel or restaurant, 1 was the insurance or financial industry, 2 or 6.5% were technical professionals or scientists, 5 or 16.1% were in education.

In 2000, there were 34 workers who commuted into the municipality and 274 workers who commuted away. The municipality is a net exporter of workers, with about 8.1 workers leaving the municipality for every one entering. About 17.6% of the workforce coming into Termen are coming from outside Switzerland. Of the working population, 21.4% used public transportation to get to work, and 59.4% used a private car.

== Religion ==
From the 2000 census, 689 or 88.2% were Roman Catholic, while 38 or 4.9% belonged to the Swiss Reformed Church. Of the rest of the population, there was 1 individual who belongs to the Christian Catholic Church, and there was 1 individual who belongs to another Christian church. There were 28 (or about 3.59% of the population) who were Islamic. 14 (or about 1.79% of the population) belonged to no church, are agnostic or atheist, and 10 individuals (or about 1.28% of the population) did not answer the question.

== Education ==
In Termen about 315 or (40.3%) of the population have completed non-mandatory upper secondary education, and 69 or (8.8%) have completed additional higher education (either university or a Fachhochschule). Of the 69 who completed tertiary schooling, 75.4% were Swiss men, 13.0% were Swiss women and 7.2% were non-Swiss women.

During the 2010-2011 school year there were a total of 62 students in the Termen school system. The education system in the Canton of Valais allows young children to attend one year of non-obligatory Kindergarten. During that school year, there was one kindergarten class (KG1 or KG2) and 19 kindergarten students. The canton's school system requires students to attend six years of primary school. In Termen there were a total of 4 classes and 62 students in the primary school. The secondary school program consists of three lower, obligatory years of schooling (orientation classes), followed by three to five years of optional, advanced schools. All the lower secondary students from Termen attend their school in a neighboring municipality. All the upper secondary students attended school in another municipality.

As of 2000, there were 50 students from Termen who attended schools outside the municipality.
