= Grengiols =

- Municipality
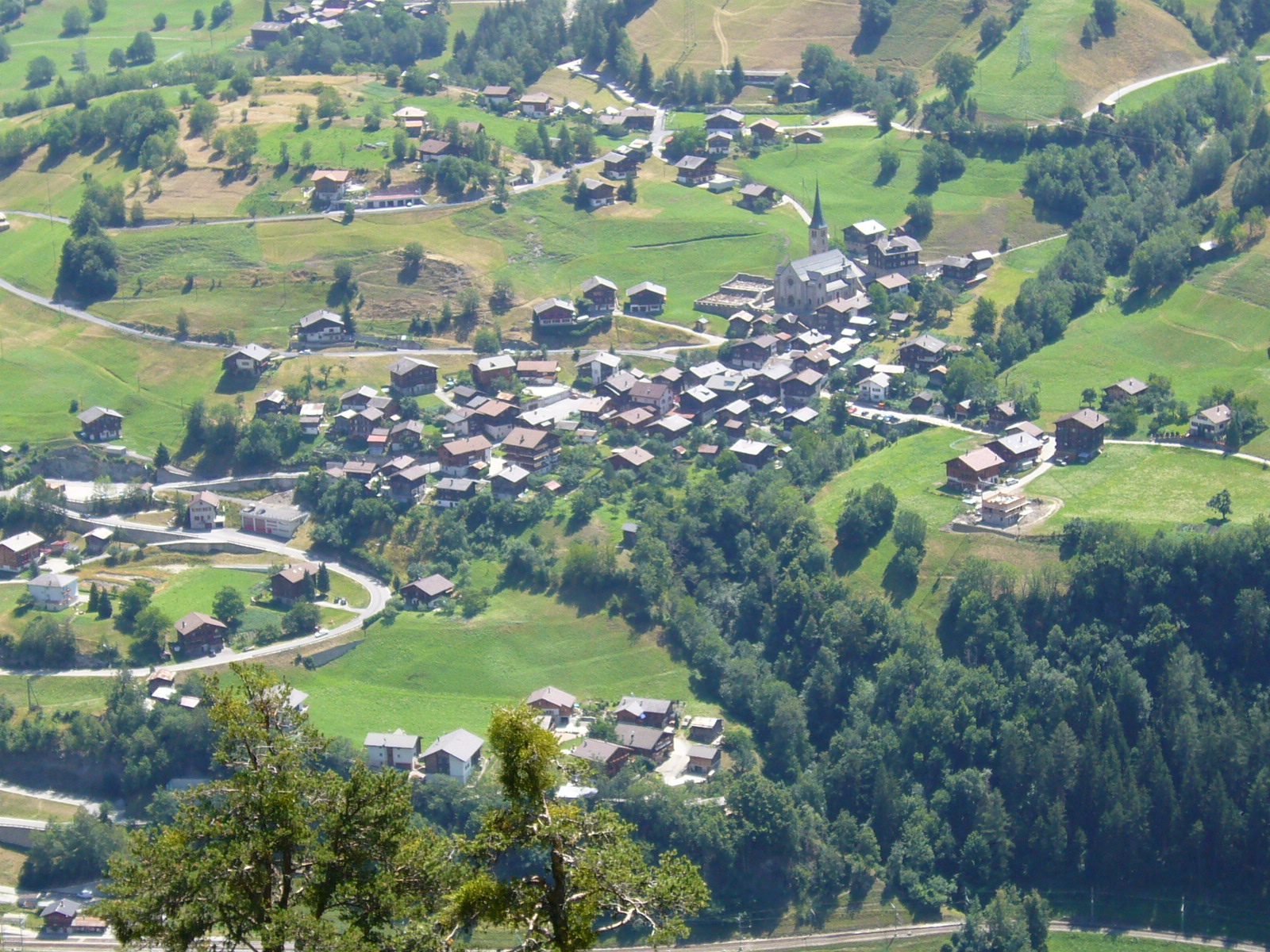
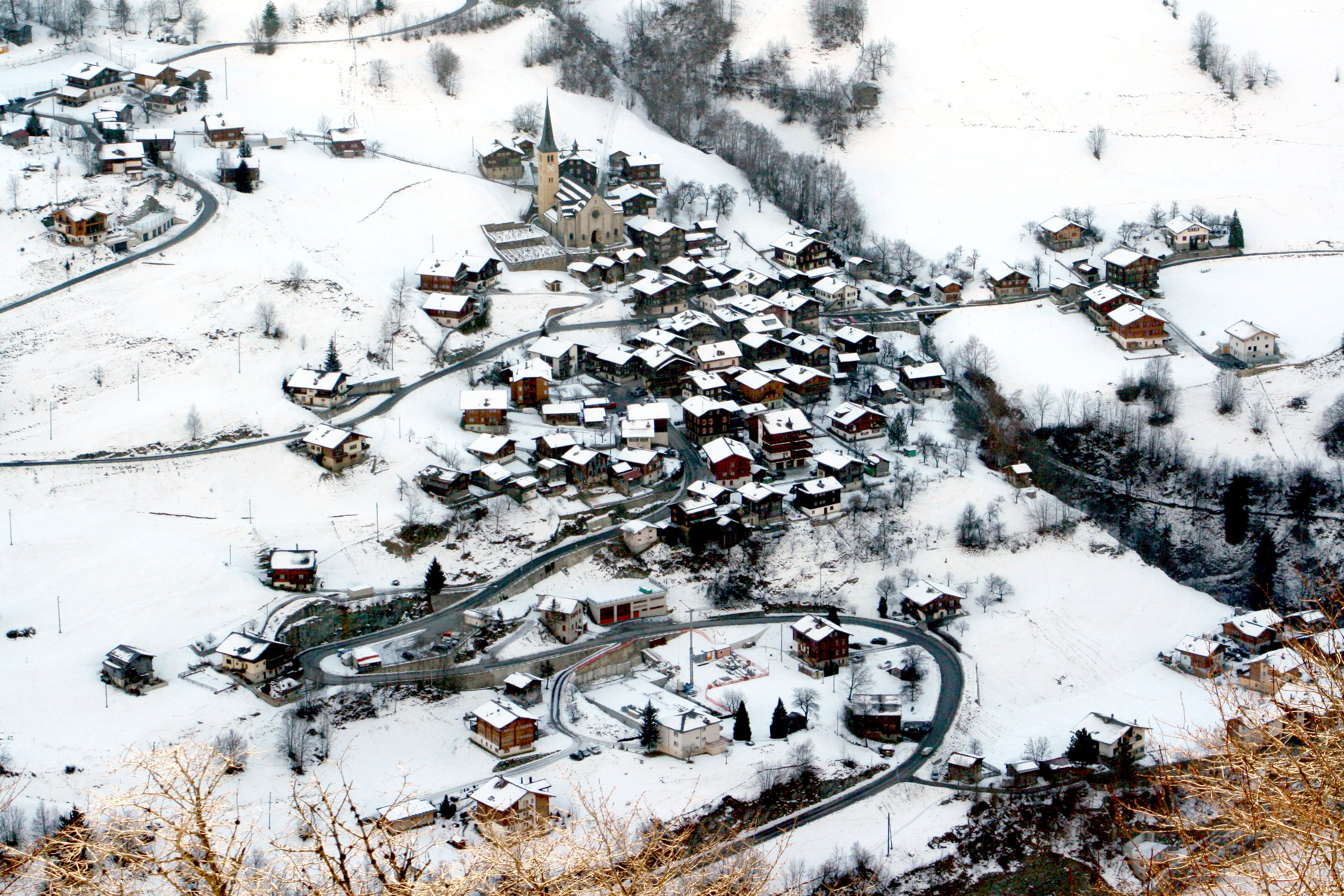
- Grengiols from the air Grengiols from the air in winter

- Flag Coat of arms
- Location of Grengiols
- Location within Switzerland Location within Canton of Valais
- Coordinates: 46°22′N 8°6′E
- Country: Switzerland
- Canton: Valais
- District: Raron

Area
  - Total: 58.5 km^{2} (22.6 sq mi)
- Elevation: 995 m (3,264 ft)

Population (December 2002)
  - Total: 497
  - Density: 8.50/km^{2} (22.0/sq mi)
- Time zone: UTC+01:00 (CET)
  - Summer (DST): UTC+02:00 (CEST)
- Postal code: 3993
- SFOS number: 6177
- ISO 3166 code: CH-VS
- Surrounded by: Baceno (IT-VB), Betten, Binn, Bister, Ernen, Filet, Lax, Martisberg, Ried-Brig, Termen, Varzo (IT-VB)
- Website: grengiols.ch

Grengiols (Swiss Standard German pronunciation: [ˈɡrɛŋi̯ːɔls]) is a municipality in the district of Raron in the canton of Valais in Switzerland.

== History ==
Grengiols is first mentioned in 1052 as Graneirolis. In 1228 it was mentioned as Griniruel and in 1297 as Graniols. The name probably comes from the Latin word graneirolas meaning a small granary.

== Geography ==
Grengiols has an area, as of 2011, of 58.5 square kilometers (22.6 mi^{2}). Of this area, 21.2% is used for agricultural purposes, while 25.6% is forested. Of the rest of the land, 0.8% is settled (buildings or roads) and 52.4% is unproductive land.

The municipality is located in the Östlich Raron district, on the southern slopes of the Rhone valley near the entrance to the Goms valley. It consists of the village of Grengiols with scattered settlements including; Hockmatte, Ze Hyschere, Bächerhyschere and others, on the road leading into the Goms valley and then over the Albrun Pass.

== Coat of arms ==
The blazon of the municipal coat of arms is Gules, two Keys Or in saltire in chief a papal Crown of the same.

== Demographics ==
Grengiols has a population (as of December 2020) of 431. As of 2008, 2.3% of the population are resident foreign nationals. Over the last 10 years (2000–2010 ) the population has changed at a rate of −3.6%. It has changed at a rate of −3.2% due to migration and at a rate of −2.4% due to births and deaths.

Most of the population (as of 2000) speaks German (481 or 98.0%) as their first language, French is the second most common (4 or 0.8%) and English is the third (2 or 0.4%).

As of 2008, the population was made up of 463 Swiss citizens and 11 non-citizen residents (2.32% of the population). Of the population in the municipality, 341 or about 69.5% were born in Grengiols and lived there in 2000. There were 93 or 18.9% who were born in the same canton, while 21 or 4.3% were born somewhere else in Switzerland, and 18 or 3.7% were born outside of Switzerland.

As of 2000, children and teenagers (0–19 years old) make up 28.3% of the population, while adults (20–64 years old) make up 51.7% and seniors (over 64 years old) make up 20%.

As of 2000, there were 228 people who were single and never married in the municipality. There were 224 married individuals, 26 widows or widowers and 13 individuals who are divorced.

As of 2000, there were 114 private households in the municipality, and an average of 3.5 persons per household. There were 14 households that consist of only one person and 29 households with five or more people. In 2000, a total of 113 apartments (36.7% of the total) were permanently occupied, while 164 apartments (53.2%) were seasonally occupied and 31 apartments (10.1%) were empty. As of 2009, the construction rate of new housing units was 2.1 new units per 1000 residents. The vacancy rate for the municipality, in 2010, was 1.9%.

The historical population is given in the following chart:

== Sights ==
The entire village of Grengiols is designated as part of the Inventory of Swiss Heritage Sites.

== Politics ==
In the 2007 federal election the most popular party was the CVP which received 55.57% of the vote. The next three most popular parties were the SVP (19.97%), the FDP (13.05%) and the SP (10.2%). In the federal election, a total of 176 votes were cast, and the voter turnout was 48.1%.

In the 2009 Conseil d'État/Staatsrat election a total of 194 votes were cast, of which 13 or about 6.7% were invalid. The voter participation was 54.3%, which is similar to the cantonal average of 54.67%. In the 2007 Swiss Council of States election a total of 175 votes were cast, of which 11 or about 6.3% were invalid. The voter participation was 47.8%, which is much less than the cantonal average of 59.88%.

== Economy ==
As of 2010, Grengiols had an unemployment rate of 1.1%. As of 2008, there were 46 people employed in the primary economic sector and about 22 businesses involved in this sector. 19 people were employed in the secondary sector and there were 8 businesses in this sector. 63 people were employed in the tertiary sector, with 14 businesses in this sector. There were 209 residents of the municipality who were employed in some capacity, of which females made up 35.4% of the workforce.

In 2008 the total number of full-time equivalent jobs was 92. The number of jobs in the primary sector was 21, all of which were in agriculture. The number of jobs in the secondary sector was 17 of which 11 or (64.7%) were in manufacturing and 6 (35.3%) were in construction. The number of jobs in the tertiary sector was 54. In the tertiary sector; 5 or 9.3% were in wholesale or retail sales or the repair of motor vehicles, 1 was in the movement and storage of goods, 7 or 13.0% were in a hotel or restaurant, 2 or 3.7% were the insurance or financial industry, 28 or 51.9% were technical professionals or scientists, 4 or 7.4% were in education.

In 2000, there were 33 workers who commuted into the municipality and 117 workers who commuted away. The municipality is a net exporter of workers, with about 3.5 workers leaving the municipality for every one entering. Of the working population, 11.5% used public transportation to get to work, and 60.8% used a private car.

== Religion ==
From the 2000 census, 449 or 91.4% were Roman Catholic, while 16 or 3.3% belonged to the Swiss Reformed Church. Of the rest of the population, there were 7 members of an Orthodox church (or about 1.43% of the population). 3 (or about 0.61% of the population) belonged to no church, are agnostic or atheist, and 16 individuals (or about 3.26% of the population) did not answer the question.

== Education ==
In Grengiols about 141 or (28.7%) of the population have completed non-mandatory upper secondary education, and 25 or (5.1%) have completed additional higher education (either university or a Fachhochschule). Of the 25 who completed tertiary schooling, 80.0% were Swiss men, 8.0% were Swiss women.

During the 2010–2011 school year there were a total of 45 students in the Grengiols school system. The education system in the Canton of Valais allows young children to attend one year of non-obligatory Kindergarten. During that school year, there was one kindergarten class (KG1 or KG2) and 8 kindergarten students. The canton's school system requires students to attend six years of primary school. In Grengiols there were a total of 4 classes and 45 students in the primary school. The secondary school program consists of three lower, obligatory years of schooling (orientation classes), followed by three to five years of optional, advanced schools. All the lower and upper secondary students from Grengiols attend their school in a neighboring municipality.

As of 2000, there were 30 students from Grengiols who attended schools outside the municipality.
