= Raron (district) =

The district of Raron was one of the 12 districts comprising the Republic of Wallis and after 1848 the canton of Valais in Switzerland. Today it is divided into two demi-districts, which are geographically separated by the District of Brig.

The district of East Raron (German: Östlich-Raron, French: Rarogne oriental) with the capital Mörel-Filet includes the following municipalities:

- CH-3991, 3994 Bettmeralp
- CH-3983 Bister
- CH-3982 Bitsch
- CH-3993 Grengiols
- CH-3983 Mörel-Filet
- CH-3986 Riederalp

The district of West Raron (German: Westlich-Raron, French: Rarogne occidental) with the capital Raron includes the following municipalities:

- CH-3938 Ausserberg
- CH-3919 Blatten
- CH-3935 Bürchen
- CH-3943 Eischoll
- CH-3916 Ferden
- CH-3917 Kippel
- CH-3942 Niedergesteln
- CH-3942 Raron
- CH-3940 Steg-Hohtenn
- CH-3944 Unterbäch
- CH-3918 Wiler
