= Riederalp =

- Municipality
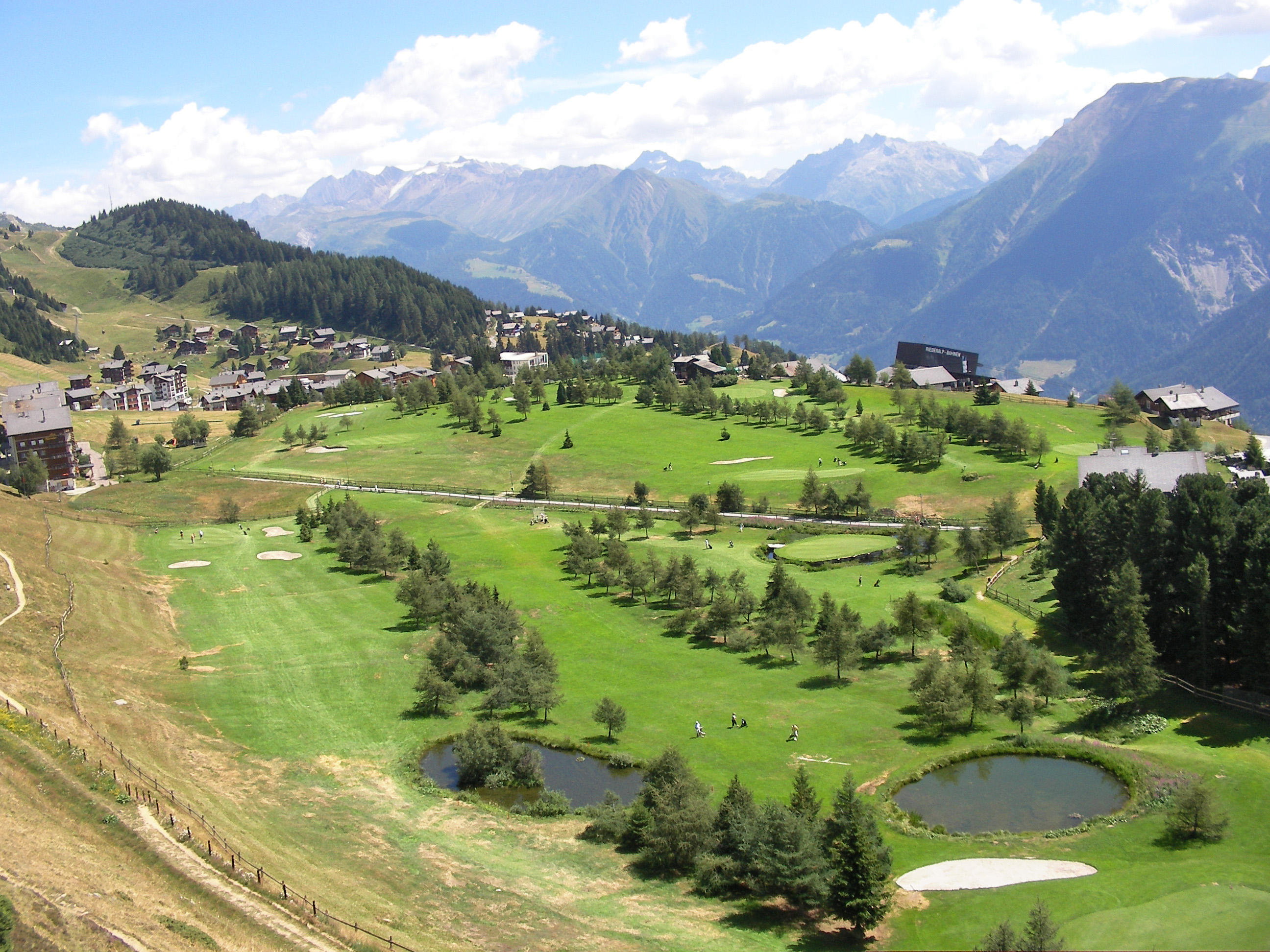
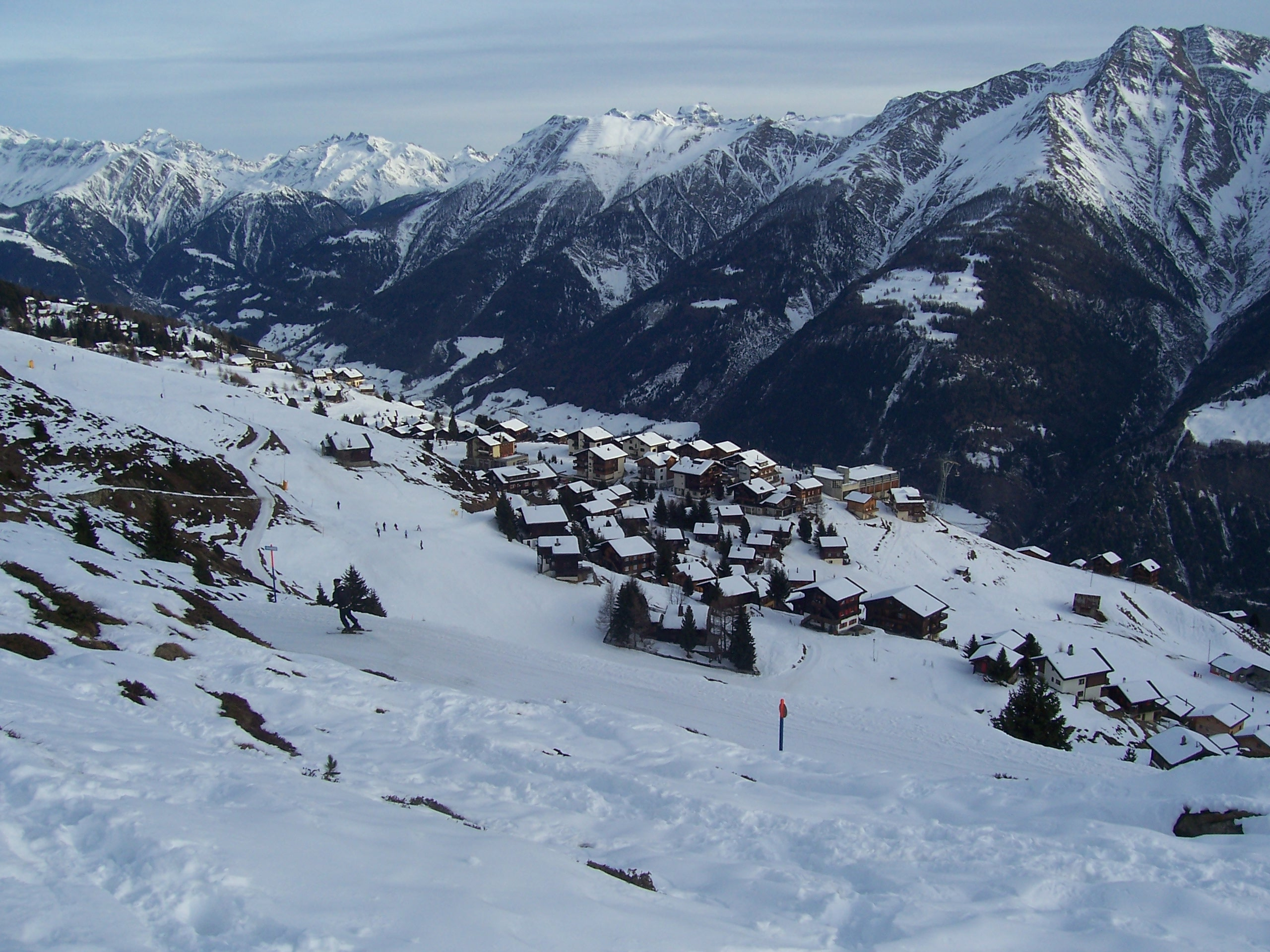

- Flag Coat of arms
- Location of Riederalp
- Location within Switzerland Location within Canton of Valais
- Coordinates: 46°23′N 8°2′E
- Country: Switzerland
- Canton: Valais
- District: Raron

Area
  - Total: 21.0 km^{2} (8.1 sq mi)
- Elevation: 1,905 m (6,250 ft)

Population (December 2002)
  - Total: 555
  - Density: 26.4/km^{2} (68.4/sq mi)
- Time zone: UTC+01:00 (CET)
  - Summer (DST): UTC+02:00 (CEST)
- Postal codes: 3987 Riederalp; 3983 Goppisberg, Greich; 3986 Ried-Mörel
- SFOS number: 6181
- ISO 3166 code: CH-VS
- Surrounded by: Betten, Bitsch, Filet, Mörel, Naters, Termen
- Website: riederalp.ch

Riederalp (German pronunciation: [ˈʁiːdɐʔalp]) is a municipality in the district of Raron in the canton of Valais in Switzerland. It was created in 2003 through the merger of Goppisberg, Greich and Ried-Mörel.

Historic aerial photograph by Werner Friedli from 1949

== Geography ==
Riederalp has an area, as of 2011, of 21 square kilometers (8.1 mi^{2}). Of this area, 27.7% is used for agricultural purposes, while 42.0% is forested. Of the rest of the land, 3.0% is settled (buildings or roads) and 27.3% is unproductive land.

The mid-mountain resort sits on a south-facing terrace, south of the 23 km (14 mi) long Aletsch Glacier—Europe's largest, in the Bernese Alps. The altitude of the village (1,930 m [6,330 ft]) allows good view of the Pennine Alps with some of its highest summits such as the Fletschhorn, Dom and Matterhorn.

== Demographics ==
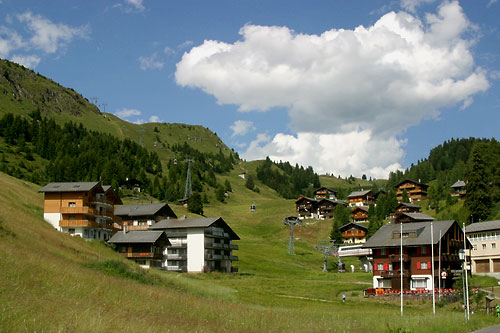
Riederalp village

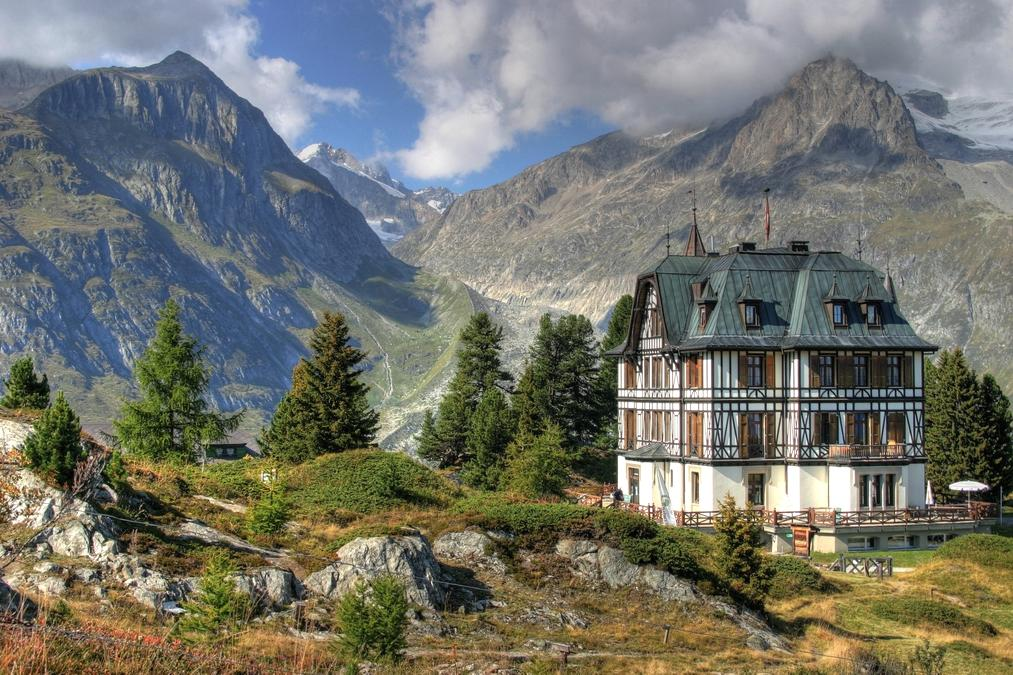
Villa Cassel. Situated near the great Aletsh glacier, it is one of the two national nature centers of Pro Natura.

Riederalp has a population (as of December 2020) of 438. As of 2008, 10.6% of the population are resident foreign nationals. Over the last 10 years (2000–2010 ) the population has changed at a rate of -3.9%. It has changed at a rate of -3.9% due to migration and at a rate of 3.6% due to births and deaths.

Most of the population (as of 2000) speaks German (95.6%) as their first language, Serbo-Croatian is the second most common (1.9%) and French is the third (0.8%).

As of 2008, the population was made up of 479 Swiss citizens and 57 non-citizen residents (10.63% of the population). As of 2000, children and teenagers (0–19 years old) make up 23.9% of the population, while adults (20–64 years old) make up 59.4% and seniors (over 64 years old) make up 16.7%.

As of 2009, the construction rate of new housing units was 9.3 new units per 1000 residents. The vacancy rate for the municipality, in 2010, was 1.33%.

== Sights ==
The entire villages of Goppisberg and Greich are designated as part of the Inventory of Swiss Heritage Sites.

== Politics ==
In the 2007 federal election the most popular party was the CVP which received 69.21% of the vote. The next three most popular parties were the SVP (13.12%), the FDP (9.33%) and the SP (6.95%). In the federal election, a total of 290 votes were cast, and the voter turnout was 69.4%.

In the 2009 Conseil d'État/Staatsrat election a total of 269 votes were cast, of which 20 or about 7.4% were invalid. The voter participation was 68.3%, which is much more than the cantonal average of 54.67%. In the 2007 Swiss Council of States election a total of 288 votes were cast, of which 17 or about 5.9% were invalid. The voter participation was 72.9%, which is much more than the cantonal average of 59.88%.

== Economy ==
As of 2010, Riederalp had an unemployment rate of 2%. As of 2008, there were 62 people employed in the primary economic sector and about 18 businesses involved in this sector. 9 people were employed in the secondary sector and there were 4 businesses in this sector. 239 people were employed in the tertiary sector, with 37 businesses in this sector.

In 2008 the total number of full-time equivalent jobs was 240. The number of jobs in the primary sector was 24, all of which were in agriculture. The number of jobs in the secondary sector was 8, all of which were in construction. The number of jobs in the tertiary sector was 208. In the tertiary sector; 21 or 10.1% were in wholesale or retail sales or the repair of motor vehicles, 11 or 5.3% were in the movement and storage of goods, 131 or 63.0% were in a hotel or restaurant, 1 was the insurance or financial industry, 2 or 1.0% were in education.

Of the working population, 28.9% used public transportation to get to work, and 20.9% used a private car.

== Education ==
During the 2010–2011 school year there were a total of 21 students in the Riederalp school system. The education system in the Canton of Valais allows young children to attend one year of non-obligatory Kindergarten. During that school year, there was one kindergarten class (KG1 or KG2) and 7 kindergarten students. The canton's school system requires students to attend six years of primary school. In Riederalp there were a total of 2 classes and 21 students in the primary school. The secondary school program consists of three lower, obligatory years of schooling (orientation classes), followed by three to five years of optional, advanced schools. All the lower and upper secondary students from Riederalp attend their school in a neighboring municipality.

== Sport ==
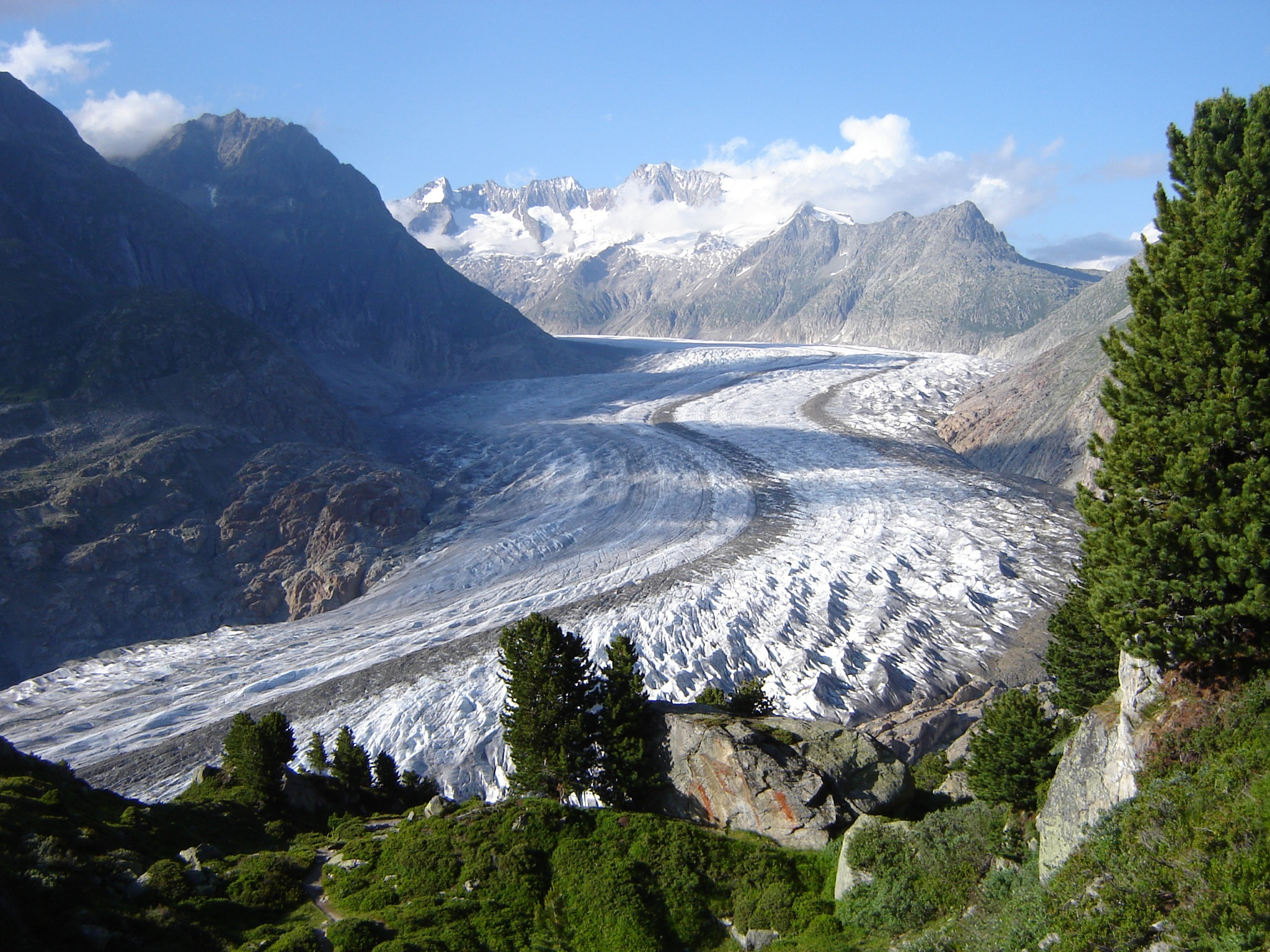
Aletsch Forest above the glacier

Beginners and intermediate skiers have the bulk of the 30 km (19 mi) of pistes, while expert skiers and snowboarders have a choice of off-piste at the top of the mountain.

Riederalp is a traffic-free village (cable car access) with a small number of permanent residents who are dwarfed by the influx of in-season tourists. Seven ski lifts operate over the 30 km (19 mi) of Riederalp and adjoining Bettmeralp's slope. In addition, there are 19 km (12 mi) of cross-country trails.

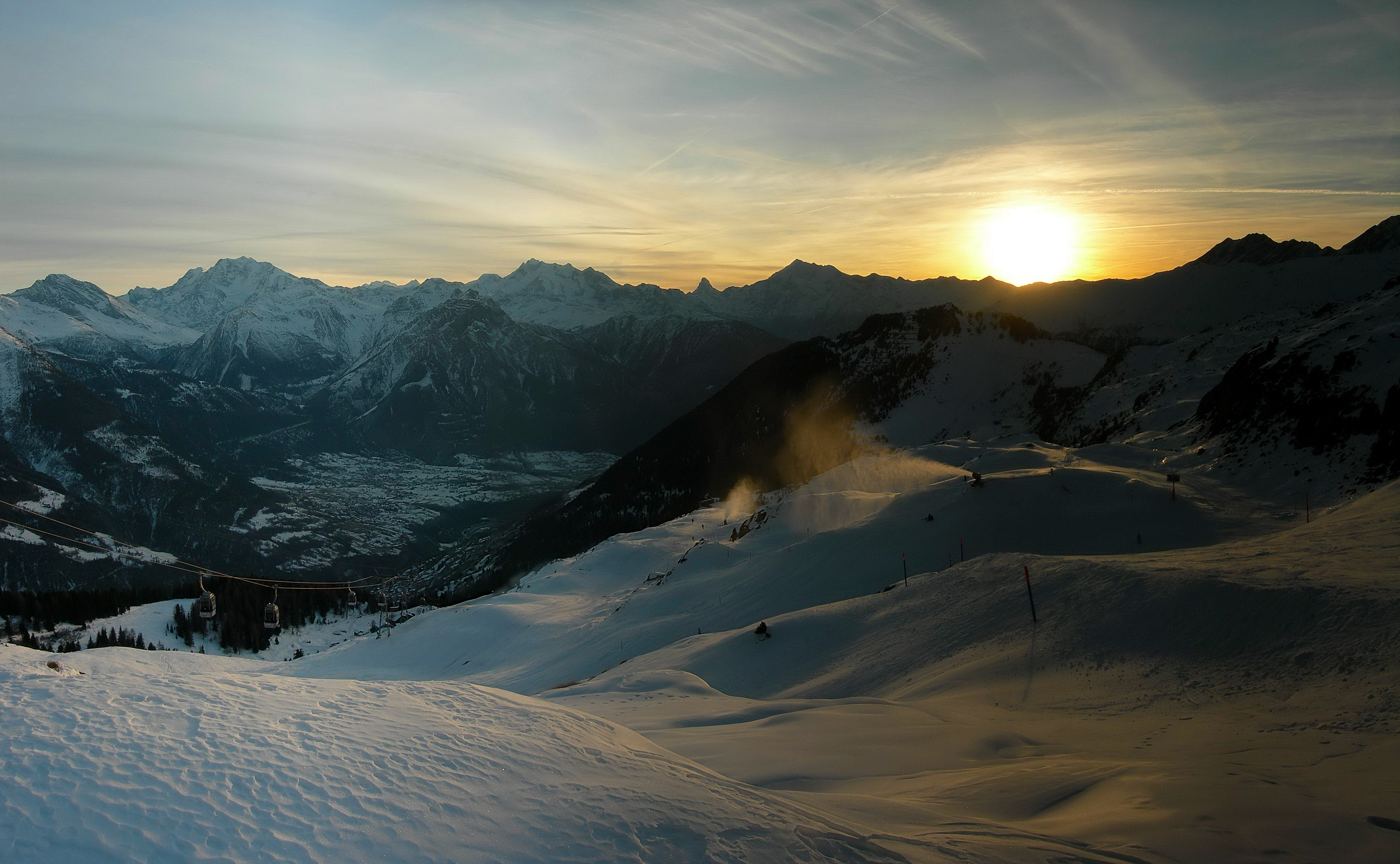
Above Riederalp in winter

There are about 25 km (16 mi) of winter walking paths around the village. There is also a sports centre, and an indoor swimming pool at Bettmeralp.

== Skilift system ==
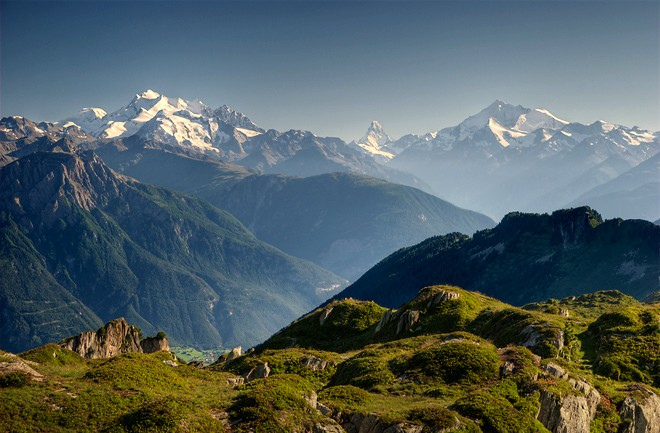
View of Pennine Alps from Riederalp

Riederalp can be reached via two Aerial tramways or Gondola lifts from Mörel. The main Ski lifts are:

Name	Type	Elevation Ground Station	Elevation Mountain Station	Slope Length	Capacity Persons/Hour	Construction Year
Mörel; Ried-Mörel	Aerial tramway	759 m (2,490 ft)	1,200 m (3,900 ft)	1,037 m (3,402 ft)	700	1996
Ried-Mörel; Riederalp	Gondola	1,200 m (3,900 ft)	1,951 m (6,401 ft)	1,980 m (6,500 ft)	700	1987
Mörel; Riederalp	Aerial tramway	759 m (2,490 ft)	1,950 m (6,400 ft)	2,798 m (9,180 ft)	500	1974
Moosfluh	Gondola	1,886 m (6,188 ft)	2,335 m (7,661 ft)	1,798 m (5,899 ft)	2200	1995
Riederfurka	Chairlift	1,876 m (6,155 ft)	2,119 m (6,952 ft)	702 m (2,303 ft)	2050	1991
Hohfluh	Chairlift	1,929 m (6,329 ft)	2,227 m (7,306 ft)	1,010 m (3,310 ft)	1090	1977
Golmenegg	Surface lift	1,954 m (6,411 ft)	2,100 m (6,900 ft)	906 m (2,972 ft)	900	1970
Alpenrose 1	Surface lift	1,903 m (6,243 ft)	1,935 m (6,348 ft)	179 m (587 ft)	1000	1980
Alpenrose 2	Surface lift	1,903 m (6,243 ft)	1,935 m (6,348 ft)	179 m (587 ft)	720	1980
