= Mörel-Filet =

- Municipality
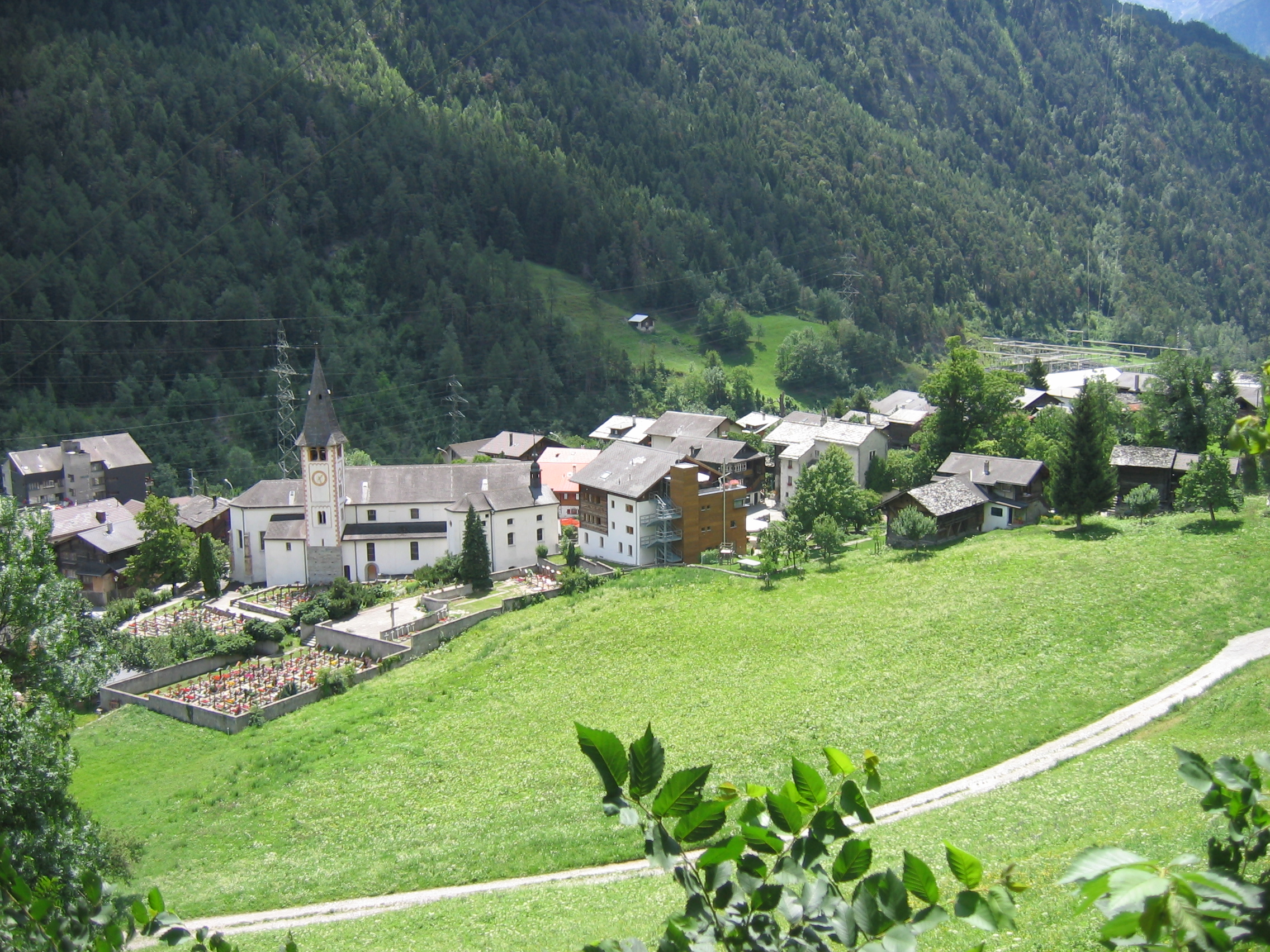

- Flag Coat of arms
- Location of Mörel-Filet
- Location within Switzerland Location within Canton of Valais
- Coordinates: 46°20′N 8°3′E
- Country: Switzerland
- Canton: Valais
- District: Östlich Raron

Government
  - Mayor: Imesch Irmina (as of 0)

Area
  - Total: 8.4 km^{2} (3.2 sq mi)
- Elevation: 759 m (2,490 ft)

Population (December 2007)
  - Total: 692
  - Density: 82/km^{2} (210/sq mi)
- Time zone: UTC+01:00 (CET)
  - Summer (DST): UTC+02:00 (CEST)
- Postal code: 3983
- SFOS number: 6203
- ISO 3166 code: CH-VS
- Localities: Mörel, Filet
- Website: moerel-filet.ch

Mörel-Filet is a municipality in the district of Östlich Raron in the canton of Valais, Switzerland. It was formed on 1. January 2009 when Mörel and Filet were merged.

== History ==
Mörel is first mentioned in 1203 as Morgi. Throughout the Middle Ages Filet was known as Gifrisch. It was first mentioned in 1374 as Gifris.

== Geography ==
Mörel-Filet has an area, as of 2011, of 8.4 square kilometers (3.2 mi^{2}). Of this area, 18.6% is used for agricultural purposes, while 51.5% is forested. Of the rest of the land, 6.3% is settled (buildings or roads) and 23.5% is unproductive land.

== Demographics ==
Mörel-Filet has a population (as of December 2020) of 707. As of 2008, 10.5% of the population are resident foreign nationals. Over the last 10 years (2000–2010 ) the population has changed at a rate of -6.1%. It has changed at a rate of -3.5% due to migration and at a rate of -3.3% due to births and deaths.

Most of the population (as of 2000) speaks German (95.0%) as their first language, Serbo-Croatian is the second most common (1.5%) and French is the third (0.7%).

As of 2008, the population was 49.8% male and 50.2% female. The population was made up of 297 Swiss men (43.9% of the population) and 40 (5.9%) non-Swiss men. There were 309 Swiss women (45.6%) and 31 (4.6%) non-Swiss women.

As of 2000, children and teenagers (0–19 years old) make up 23.2% of the population, while adults (20–64 years old) make up 58.3% and seniors (over 64 years old) make up 18.5%.

The vacancy rate for the municipality, in 2010, was 2.6%.

== Historic population ==
The historical population is given in the following chart:

== Economy ==
As of 2010, Mörel-Filet had an unemployment rate of 2.9%. As of 2008, there were 21 people employed in the primary economic sector and about 10 businesses involved in this sector. 62 people were employed in the secondary sector and there were 13 businesses in this sector. 271 people were employed in the tertiary sector, with 33 businesses in this sector.

Of the working population, 18.7% used public transportation to get to work, and 44.8% used a private car.
