= Bitsch, Switzerland =

Municipality in Valais, Switzerland

Bitsch
- Municipality
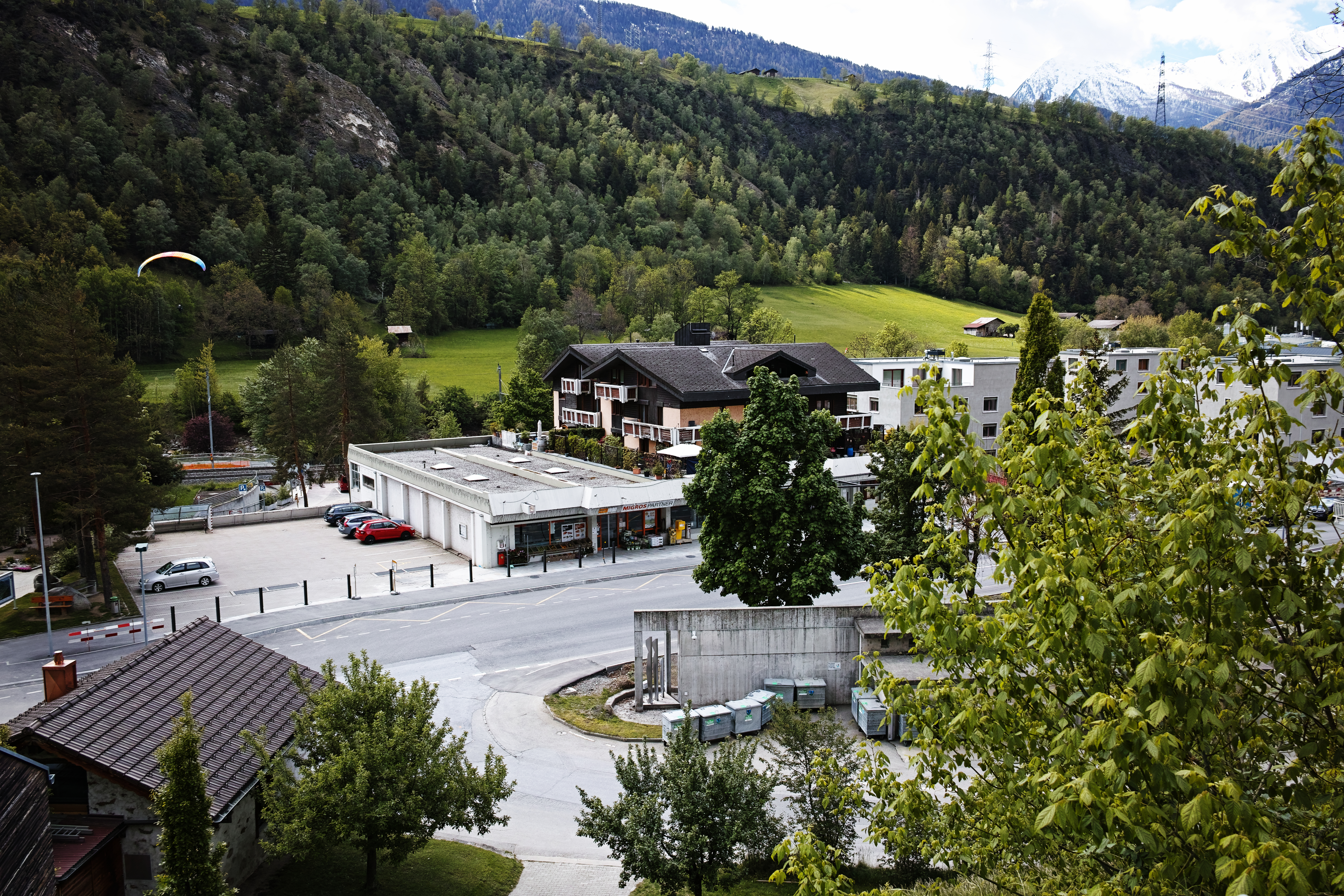

- Flag Coat of arms
- Location of Bitsch
- Location within Switzerland Location within Canton of Valais
- Coordinates: 46°20′N 8°0′E
- Country: Switzerland
- Canton: Valais
- District: Raron

Area
  - Total: 4.0 km^{2} (1.5 sq mi)
- Elevation: 692 m (2,270 ft)

Population (December 2002)
  - Total: 794
  - Density: 200/km^{2} (510/sq mi)
- Time zone: UTC+01:00 (CET)
  - Summer (DST): UTC+02:00 (CEST)
- Postal code: 3982
- SFOS number: 6173
- ISO 3166 code: CH-VS
- Surrounded by: Naters, Riederalp, Termen
- Website: www.bitsch.ch

Bitsch (German pronunciation: [bɪtʃ]) is a municipality in the district of Raron in the canton of Valais in Switzerland.

== Geography ==
Bitsch has an area, as of 2011, of 4.1 square kilometers (1.6 mi^{2}). Of this area, 22.9% is used for agricultural purposes, while 49.9% is forested. Of the rest of the land, 9.1% is settled (buildings or roads) and 18.2% is unproductive land.

The municipality is located in the Östlich-Raron district, on the southern facing slopes of the mountains. It consists of scattered, small hamlets including the main hamlet of Wasen.

== Coat of arms ==
The blazon of the municipal coat of arms is Azure, on Coupeaux Vert a Chamois rampant Sable langued Gules between an edelweiss and a rhododendron proper.

== Demographics ==
Bitsch has a population (as of December 2020) of 1,035. As of 2008, 7.7% of the population are resident foreign nationals. Over the last 10 years (2000–2010 ) the population has changed at a rate of 8.8%. It has changed at a rate of 8% due to migration and at a rate of 4.3% due to births and deaths.

Most of the population (as of 2000) speaks German (721 or 96.5%) as their first language, Dutch is the second most common (8 or 1.1%) and French is the third (7 or 0.9%). There are 7 people who speak Italian.

As of 2008, the population was made up of 775 Swiss citizens and 65 non-citizen residents (7.74% of the population). Of the population in the municipality, 277 or about 37.1% were born in Bitsch and lived there in 2000. There were 329 or 44.0% who were born in the same canton, while 83 or 11.1% were born somewhere else in Switzerland, and 42 or 5.6% were born outside of Switzerland.

As of 2000, children and teenagers (0–19 years old) make up 30.3% of the population, while adults (20–64 years old) make up 60% and seniors (over 64 years old) make up 9.8%.

As of 2000, there were 340 people who were single and never married in the municipality. There were 347 married individuals, 32 widows or widowers and 28 individuals who are divorced.

As of 2000, there were 268 private households in the municipality, and an average of 2.7 persons per household. There were 54 households that consist of only one person and 28 households with five or more people. In 2000, a total of 254 apartments (66.0% of the total) were permanently occupied, while 107 apartments (27.8%) were seasonally occupied and 24 apartments (6.2%) were empty. As of 2009, the construction rate of new housing units was 2.4 new units per 1000 residents. The vacancy rate for the municipality, in 2010, was 2.41%.

The historical population is given in the following chart:

=== Religion ===
From the 2000 census, 658 or 88.1% were Roman Catholic, while 32 or 4.3% belonged to the Swiss Reformed Church. Of the rest of the population, there were 10 individuals (or about 1.34% of the population) who belonged to another Christian church. There was 1 individual who was Islamic. There was 1 person who was Buddhist. 22 (or about 2.95% of the population) belonged to no church, are agnostic or atheist, and 28 individuals (or about 3.75% of the population) did not answer the question.

== Sights ==
The entire hamlet of Wasen is designated as part of the Inventory of Swiss Heritage Sites.

== Politics ==
In the 2007 federal election the most popular party was the CVP which received 55.66% of the vote. The next three most popular parties were the SVP (23.45%), the SP (13.69%) and the FDP (5.44%). In the federal election, a total of 337 votes were cast, and the voter turnout was 55.9%.

In the 2009 Conseil d'État/Staatsrat election a total of 354 votes were cast, of which 34 or about 9.6% were invalid. The voter participation was 58.3%, which is similar to the cantonal average of 54.67%. In the 2007 Swiss Council of States election a total of 338 votes were cast, of which 8 or about 2.4% were invalid. The voter participation was 56.2%, which is similar to the cantonal average of 59.88%.

== Economy ==
As of 2010, Bitsch had an unemployment rate of 1.5%. As of 2008, there were 24 people employed in the primary economic sector and about 15 businesses involved in this sector. 61 people were employed in the secondary sector and there were 10 businesses in this sector. 189 people were employed in the tertiary sector, with 20 businesses in this sector. There were 353 residents of the municipality who were employed in some capacity, of which females made up 38.2% of the workforce.

In 2008 the total number of full-time equivalent jobs was 224. The number of jobs in the primary sector was 6, all of which were in agriculture. The number of jobs in the secondary sector was 59 of which 37 or (62.7%) were in manufacturing and 4 (6.8%) were in construction. The number of jobs in the tertiary sector was 159. In the tertiary sector; 63 or 39.6% were in wholesale or retail sales or the repair of motor vehicles, 12 or 7.5% were in the movement and storage of goods, 5 or 3.1% were in a hotel or restaurant, 5 or 3.1% were the insurance or financial industry, 5 or 3.1% were technical professionals or scientists, 5 or 3.1% were in education and 59 or 37.1% were in health care.

In 2000, there were 153 workers who commuted into the municipality and 250 workers who commuted away. The municipality is a net exporter of workers, with about 1.6 workers leaving the municipality for every one entering. About 12.4% of the workforce coming into Bitsch are coming from outside Switzerland. Of the working population, 15% used public transportation to get to work, and 63.2% used a private car.

== Education ==
In Bitsch about 297 or (39.8%) of the population have completed non-mandatory upper secondary education, and 61 or (8.2%) have completed additional higher education (either university or a Fachhochschule). Of the 61 who completed tertiary schooling, 67.2% were Swiss men, 18.0% were Swiss women and 8.2% were non-Swiss women.

During the 2010–2011 school year there were a total of 60 students in the Bitsch school system. The education system in the Canton of Valais allows young children to attend one year of non-obligatory Kindergarten. During that school year, there was one kindergarten class (KG1 or KG2) and 15 kindergarten students. The canton's school system requires students to attend six years of primary school. In Bitsch there were a total of 4 classes and 60 students in the primary school. The secondary school program consists of three lower, obligatory years of schooling (orientation classes), followed by three to five years of optional, advanced schools. All the lower and upper secondary students from Bitsch attend their school in a neighboring municipality.

As of 2000, there was one student in Bitsch who came from another municipality, while 49 residents attended schools outside the municipality.
