= Steg-Hohtenn =

- Municipality
- Flag Coat of arms
- Location of Steg-Hohtenn
- Location within Switzerland Location within Canton of Valais
- Coordinates: 46°17′N 7°47′E
- Country: Switzerland
- Canton: Valais
- District: Raron

Government
  - Mayor: Philipp Schnyder

Area
  - Total: 14.16 km^{2} (5.47 sq mi)
- Elevation: 660 m (2,170 ft)

Population (December 2020)
  - Total: 1,620
  - Density: 114/km^{2} (296/sq mi)
- Time zone: UTC+01:00 (CET)
  - Summer (DST): UTC+02:00 (CEST)
- Postal code: 3940
- SFOS number: 6204
- ISO 3166 code: CH-VS
- Surrounded by: Eischoll, Ferden, Gampel, Kippel, Raron, Turtmann, Unterbäch, Wiler (Lötschen)
- Website: www.weibil.ch

Steg-Hohtenn is a municipality in the district of Raron in the canton of Valais in Switzerland. The municipality comprises the villages of Steg and Hohtenn.

== History ==
Steg-Hohtenn was created on 1 January 2009 through the merger of the former municipalities of Steg and Hohtenn.

== Geography ==
Steg-Hohtenn has an area, as of 2011, of 14.2 square kilometers (5.5 mi^{2}). Of this area, 10.1% is used for agricultural purposes, while 38.1% is forested. Of the rest of the land, 9.6% is settled (buildings or roads) and 42.1% is unproductive land.

The village of Steg is located at the southern entrance to the Lötschental or Lötschen valley. The western border of the village is the Lonza river, which is also the district border and the border with the neighboring village of Gampel.

Hohtenn village is located on terrace above the eastern entrance to the Lötschental and is about 150 meters (490 ft) above Steg.

== Demographics ==
Steg-Hohtenn is located in the German speaking section of the canton and consists of the villages of Steg (with about 1,300 inhabitants) and Hohtenn (with about 250 inhabitants).

Steg-Hohtenn has a population (as of December 2020) of 1,620. As of 2008, 7.5% of the population are resident foreign nationals. Over the last 10 years (2000–2010 ) the population has changed at a rate of -3.9%. It has changed at a rate of -0.3% due to migration and at a rate of -0.1% due to births and deaths.

Most of the population (as of 2000) speaks German (95.8%) as their first language, Serbo-Croatian is the second most common (1.3%) and Albanian is the third (0.9%).

As of 2008, the population was 50.6% male and 49.4% female. The population was made up of 705 Swiss men (46.6% of the population) and 61 (4.0%) non-Swiss men. There were 696 Swiss women (46.0%) and 52 (3.4%) non-Swiss women.

As of 2000, children and teenagers (0–19 years old) make up 22.3% of the population, while adults (20–64 years old) make up 63.7% and seniors (over 64 years old) make up 14.1%.

As of 2009, the construction rate of new housing units was 1.3 new units per 1000 residents. The vacancy rate for the municipality, in 2010, was 0.13%.

== Economy ==
As of 2010, Steg-Hohtenn had an unemployment rate of 1.3%. As of 2008, there were 48 people employed in the primary economic sector and about 22 businesses involved in this sector. 461 people were employed in the secondary sector and there were 19 businesses in this sector. 482 people were employed in the tertiary sector, with 56 businesses in this sector. There were residents of the municipality who were employed in some capacity.

Of the working population, 15.3% used public transportation to get to work, and 51.2% used a private car.

== Transport ==
Two railway stations are located within the municipality of Steg-Hohtenn. Gampel-Steg station is on the Simplon line from Lausanne to Brig, and is situated alongside the River Rhone at the villages lowest point. Hohtenn station is on the Lötschberg line from Bern to Brig, and is situated above Hohtenn village, some 450 metres (1,480 ft) higher than Gampel-Steg station.

Hohtenn station is served by trains to Bern, Thun and Brig. Gampel-Steg station is served by trains to Brig, Visp, Martigny and Monthey. A PostAuto bus service links Gampel-Steg station, Gampel village and Hohtenn village.

== Notable residents ==
- Raphael Wicky retired international footballer
