= Bister, Switzerland =

Bister
- Municipality
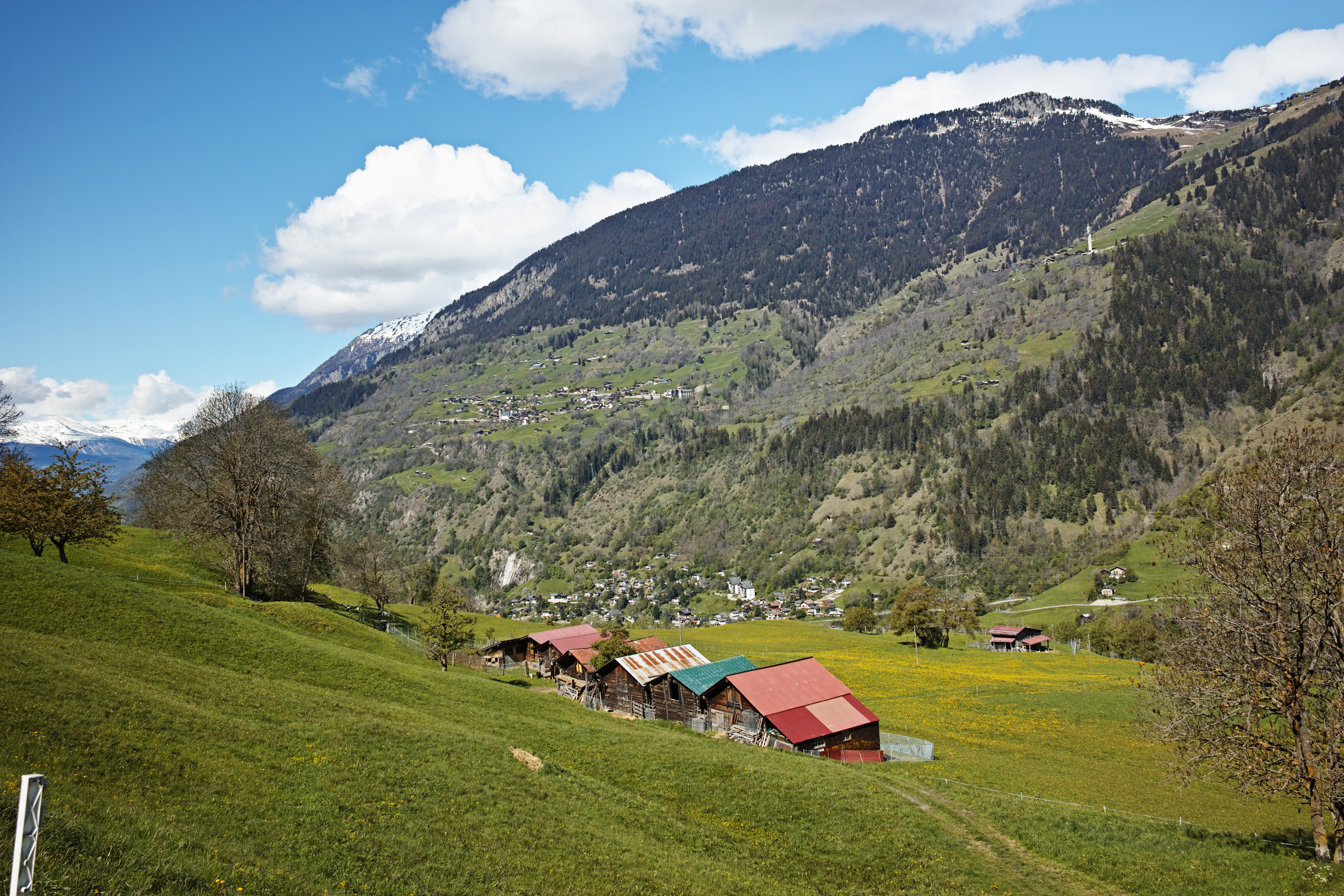

- Flag Coat of arms
- Location of Bister
- Location within Switzerland Location within Canton of Valais
- Coordinates: 46°22′N 8°4′E
- Country: Switzerland
- Canton: Valais
- District: Raron

Area
  - Total: 5.8 km^{2} (2.2 sq mi)
- Elevation: 1,054 m (3,458 ft)

Population (December 2004)
  - Total: 27
  - Density: 4.7/km^{2} (12/sq mi)
- Time zone: UTC+01:00 (CET)
  - Summer (DST): UTC+02:00 (CEST)
- Postal code: 3983
- SFOS number: 6172
- ISO 3166 code: CH-VS
- Surrounded by: Filet, Grengiols, Termen
- Website: website missing SFSO statistics

Bister is a municipality in the district of Raron in the canton of Valais in Switzerland.

== History ==
Bister is first mentioned in 1374 as Bystur. In 1480 it was mentioned as Bistar.

== Geography ==
Bister has an area, as of 2011, of 5.8 square kilometers (2.2 mi^{2}). Of this area, 18.4% is used for agricultural purposes, while 40.0% is forested. Of the rest of the land, 0.3% is settled (buildings or roads) and 41.3% is unproductive land.

The municipality is located in the Östlich-Raron district. It consists of houses scattered across the valley slopes.

== Coat of arms ==
The blazon of the municipal coat of arms is Per bend Azure and Sable, in base issuant from Water wavy Argent Coupeaux Vert and a wheat ear Or.

== Demographics ==
Bister has a population (as of December 2020) of 34. As of 2008, 3.7% of the population are resident foreign nationals. Over the last 10 years (2000–2010 ) the population has changed at a rate of 3.8%. It has changed at a rate of 7.7% due to migration and at a rate of -15.4% due to births and deaths.

All of the population (as of 2000) speaks German as their first language.

As of 2008, the population was made up of 26 Swiss citizens and 1 non-citizen residents (3.70% of the population). Of the population in the municipality, 15 or about 45.5% were born in Bister and lived there in 2000. There were 12 or 36.4% who were born in the same canton, while 4 or 12.1% were born somewhere else in Switzerland, and 1 or 3.0% were born outside of Switzerland.

As of 2000, children and teenagers (0–19 years old) make up 9.1% of the population, while adults (20–64 years old) make up 57.6% and seniors (over 64 years old) make up 33.3%.

As of 2000, there were 15 people who were single and never married in the municipality. There were 17 married individuals, 1 widows or widowers and 0 individuals who were divorced.

As of 2000, there were 14 private households in the municipality, and an average of 2.1 persons per household. There were 7 households that consist of only one person and 1 households with five or more people. In 2000, a total of 14 apartments (31.8% of the total) were permanently occupied, while 25 apartments (56.8%) were seasonally occupied and 5 apartments (11.4%) were empty.

The historical population is given in the following chart:

=== Religion ===
From the 2000 census, 28 or 84.8% were Roman Catholic, while 3 or 9.1% belonged to the Swiss Reformed Church. Of the rest of the population, there was 1 individual who belongs to another Christian church. 1 (or about 3.03% of the population) belonged to no church, are agnostic or atheist.

== Politics ==
In the 2007 federal election the most popular party was the CVP which received 47.62% of the vote. The next three most popular parties were the SP (28.57%), the SVP (17.46%) and the FDP (6.35%). In the federal election, a total of 18 votes were cast, and the voter turnout was 69.2%.

In the 2009 Conseil d'État/Staatsrat election a total of 17 votes were cast, of which 1 or about 5.9% were invalid. The voter participation was 65.4%, which is much more than the cantonal average of 54.67%. In the 2007 Swiss Council of States election a total of 18 votes were cast. The voter participation was 69.2%, which is much more than the cantonal average of 59.88%.

== Economy ==
As of 2010, Bister had an unemployment rate of 0%. As of 2008, there were 8 people employed in the primary economic sector and about 3 businesses involved in this sector. No one was employed in the secondary sector or the tertiary sector. There were 16 residents of the municipality who were employed in some capacity, of which females made up 56.3% of the workforce.

In 2008 the total number of full-time equivalent jobs was 4, all of which were in agriculture.

In 2000, there were 9 workers who commuted away from the municipality. Of the working population, 12.5% used public transportation to get to work, and 50% used a private car.

== Education ==
In Bister about 11 or (33.3%) of the population have completed non-mandatory upper secondary education, and 3 or (9.1%) have completed additional higher education (either university or a Fachhochschule). Of the 3 who completed tertiary schooling, 2 were Swiss men, 1 was a Swiss women.

As of 2000, there were 2 students from Bister who attended schools outside the municipality.
