= Municipalities of Switzerland =

Smallest government division in Switzerland

Municipalities of Switzerland: Gemeinden (German); Communes (French); Comuni (Italian); Vischnancas (Romansh)
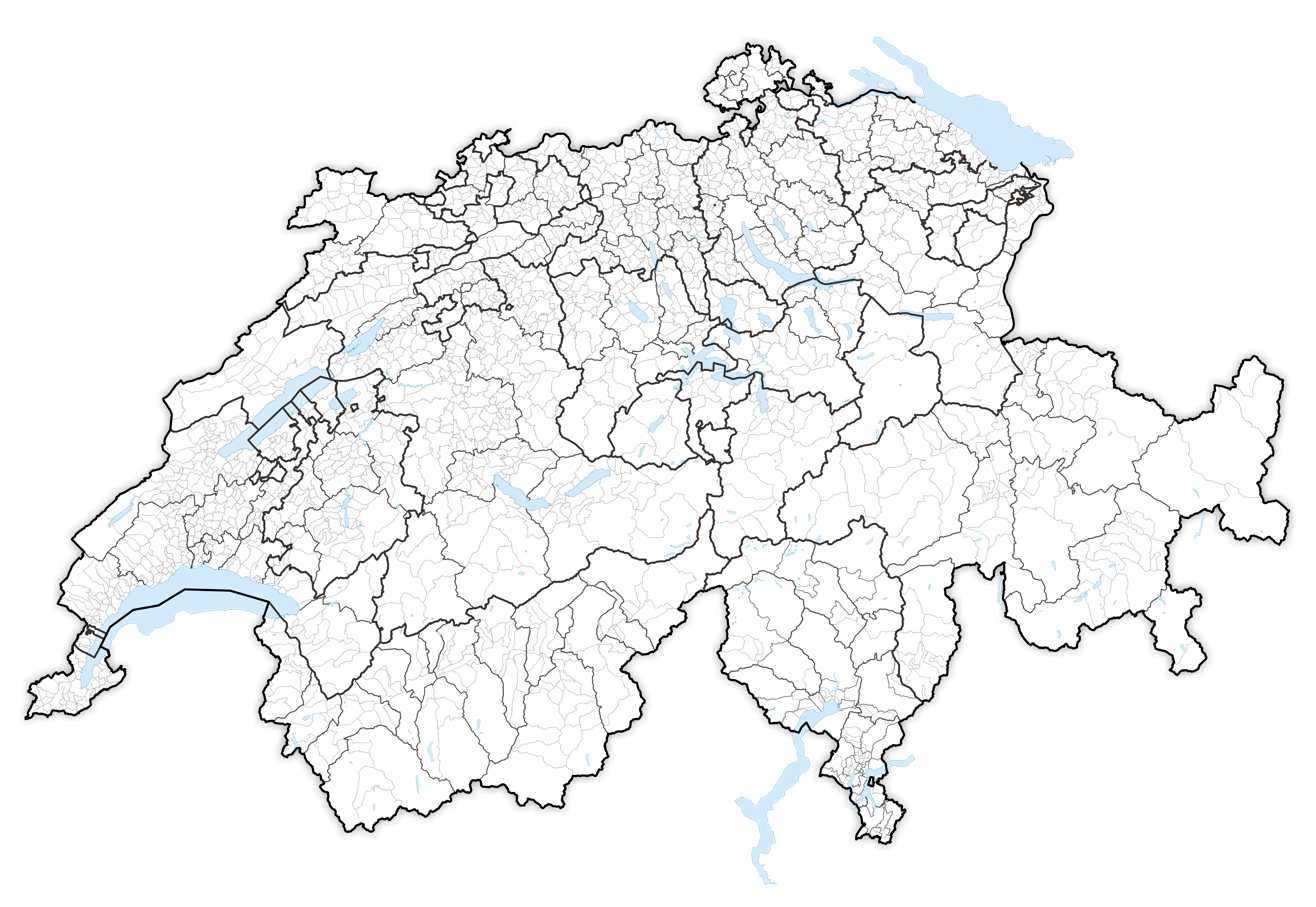
- Map of Switzerland showing cantonal, districts and municipal boundaries (January 2026)
- Category: Municipality
- Location: Switzerland
- Found in: Canton or District
- Number: 2,110 (as of 2026)
- Populations: 32–376 990
- Areas: 0.32–439 km²

Municipalities (German: Gemeinden, Einwohnergemeinden or politische Gemeinden; French: communes; Italian: comuni; Romansh: vischnancas) are the lowest level of administrative division in Switzerland. Each municipality is part of one of the Swiss cantons, which form the Swiss Confederation. In most cantons, municipalities are also part of districts or other sub-cantonal administrative divisions.

There are 2,110 municipalities as of January 2026. Their populations range between several hundred thousand (Zürich), and a few dozen people (Kammersrohr, Bister), and their territory between 0.32 km^{2} (Rivaz) and 439 km^{2} (Scuol).

== History ==
The beginnings of the modern municipality system date back to the Helvetic Republic. Under the Old Swiss Confederacy, citizenship was granted by each town and village to only residents. These citizens enjoyed access to community property and in some cases additional protection under the law. Additionally, the urban towns and the rural villages had differing rights and laws. The creation of a uniform Swiss citizenship, which applied equally for citizens of the old towns and their tenants and servants, led to conflict. The wealthier villagers and urban citizens held rights to forests, common land and other municipal property which they did not want to share with the "new citizens", who were generally poor. The compromise solution, which was written into the municipal laws of the Helvetic Republic, is still valid today. Two politically separate but often geographically similar organizations were created. The first, the so-called municipality, was a political community formed by election and its voting body consists of all resident citizens. However, the community land and property remained with the former local citizens who were gathered together into the Bürgergemeinde/bourgeoisie. During the Mediation era (1803–1814), and especially during the Restoration era (1814–1830), many of the gains toward uniform citizenship were lost. Many political municipalities were abolished and limits were placed on the exercise of political rights for everyone except the members of the Bürgergemeinde. In the Regeneration era (1830–1848), the liberal revolutions of the common people helped to restore some rights again in a few cantons. In other cantons, the Bürgergemeinden were able to maintain power as political communities. In the city of Zürich it was not until the Municipal Act of 1866 that the political municipality came back into existence.

The relationship between the political municipality and the Bürgergemeinde was often dominated by the latter's ownership of community property. Often the administration and profit from the property were totally held by the Bürgergemeinden, leaving the political municipality dependent on the Bürgergemeinde for money and use of the property. It was not until the political municipality acquired rights over property that served the public (such as schools, fire stations, etc.) and taxes, that they obtained full independence. For example, in the city of Bern, it was not until after the property division of 1852 that the political municipality had the right to levy taxes.

It was not until the Federal Constitution of 1874 that all Swiss citizens were granted equal political rights on local and Federal levels. This revised constitution finally removed all the political voting and electoral body rights from the Bürgergemeinde. In the cities, the percentage of members in the Bürgergemeinde in the population was reduced as a result of increasing emigration to the cities. This led to the Bürgergemeinde losing its former importance to a large extent. However, the Bürgergemeinde has remained, and it includes all individuals who are citizens of the Bürgergemeinde, usually by having inherited the Bürgerrecht (citizenship), regardless of where they were born or where they may currently live. Instead of the place of birth, Swiss legal documents, e.g. passports, contain the Bürgerort (place of citizenship, or place of origin). The Bürgergemeinde also often holds and administers the common property in the village for the members of the community.

== Structure and responsibilities ==
Each canton determines the powers and responsibilities of its municipalities. These may include providing local government services such as education, medical and social services, public transportation, and tax collection. The degree of centralization varies from one canton to another. The federal constitution protects the autonomy of municipalities within the framework set out by cantonal law.

Municipalities are generally governed by an executive council headed by a president or mayor. Legislative authority is exercised by a town meeting of all citizens, or by a municipal parliament, depending on the size of the municipality, and on cantonal and municipal law. In some cantons, foreigners who have lived for a certain time in Switzerland are also allowed to participate in municipal politics. As at the cantonal and federal level, citizens enjoy political rights, including direct democratic ones, in their municipality.

Municipalities are financed through direct taxes (such as income tax), with rates varying more or less within a framework set by the canton (see Taxation in Switzerland). As among the cantons, there is a tax transfer among the municipalities to balance various levels of tax income.

== Size and designations ==
Switzerland has a relatively high number of small municipalities, with a population of 1,000 or less, especially in rural areas. Because of the increasing difficulty in providing professional government services and in finding volunteers for political offices in small municipalities, the cantons tend to encourage voluntary mergers of municipalities. This led to the number of municipalities dropping by 384 between the end of 2010 and the beginning of 2019.

Some municipalities designate themselves as "city" (ville or Stadt) or as "village" (Dorf). These designations result from tradition or local preference – for example, several small municipalities designated as cities held city rights in medieval times – and normally do not impact the legal or political rights or obligations of the municipalities under cantonal or federal law.

Municipalities are numbered by the Swiss Federal Office for Statistics (see Community Identification Number#Switzerland). One or more postal codes (PLZ/NPA) can by assigned to a municipality or shared with other municipalities.

Population	No. of municipalities in 2004 (%)
>20,000	30 (1.1%)
10,000–19,999	89 (3.2%)
5000–9999	180 (6.6%)
1000–4999	1025 (37.4%)
500–999	555 (20.3%)
<500	861 (31.4%)
Total	2740 (100%)

=== List of municipalities by population (2011–21) ===
Between 2011 and 2021 nine of the smallest municipalities merged into others as part of the effort to eliminate the smallest communities. Only Bister has not merged into a new municipality although the smallest municipality is now Kammersrohr with a population of just 32.

Largest municipalities (2011)
Rank	City	Canton	Pop.
1	Zürich	Zürich	376,990
2	Geneva	Geneva	188,234
3	Basel	Basel-Stadt	164,516
4	Lausanne	Vaud	129,383
5	Bern	Bern	125,681
6	Winterthur	Zürich	103,075
7	Lucerne	Lucerne	78,093
8	St. Gallen	St. Gallen	73,505
9	Lugano	Ticino	55,151
10	Biel/Bienne	Bern	51,635

Smallest municipalities (2011)
Rank	City	Canton	Pop.
1	Corippo	Ticino	12
2	Martisberg	Valais	19
3	Mulegns	Graubünden	29
4	St. Martin	Graubünden	31
5	Bister	Valais	33
6	Pigniu	Graubünden	33
7	Selma	Graubünden	33
8	Gresso	Ticino	34
9	Cauco	Graubünden	35
10	Monible	Bern	37

Largest municipalities (2021)
Rank	City	Canton	Pop.
1	Zürich	Zürich	420,217
2	Geneva	Geneva	203,951
3	Basel	Basel-Stadt	173,232
4	Lausanne	Vaud	139,408
5	Bern	Bern	134,591
6	Winterthur	Zürich	113,173
7	Lucerne	Lucerne	82,257
8	St. Gallen	St. Gallen	76,090
9	Lugano	Ticino	62,615
10	Biel/Bienne	Bern	55,602

Smallest municipalities (2021)
Rank	City	Canton	Pop.
1	Kammersrohr	Solothurn	32
2	Bister	Valais	33
3	Schelten	Bern	35
4	Berken	Bern	41
5	Rebévelier	Bern	42
6	Cerentino	Ticino	45
7	Linescio	Ticino	47
8	Clavaleyres	Bern	48
9	Bosco/Gurin	Ticino	49
10	Meienried	Bern	50

== Lists of municipalities by canton ==
- Aargau: Einwohnergemeinden
- Appenzell I.R.: Bezirke
- Appenzell A.R.: Einwohnergemeinden
- Basel-City: Einwohnergemeinden
- Basel-Country: Einwohnergemeinden
- Bern: Einwohnergemeinden or communes municipales
- Fribourg: communes or Gemeinden
- Geneva: communes
- Glarus: Ortsgemeinden
- Grisons: politische Gemeinden,
  Vischnancas politicas or comuni politici
- Jura: communes
- Lucerne: Einwohnergemeinden
- Neuchâtel: communes
- Nidwalden: Gemeinden
- Obwalden: Einwohnergemeinden
- Schaffhausen: Einwohnergemeinden
- Schwyz: Gemeinden
- Solothurn: Einwohnergemeinden
- St. Gallen: Politische Gemeinden
- Thurgau: politische Gemeinden
- Ticino: comuni politici
- Uri: Einwohnergemeinde
- Valais: communes municipales or
  Einwohnergemeinden
- Vaud: communes
- Zug: Einwohnergemeinde
- Zürich: Politische Gemeinden

== Other local subdivisions and entities ==
In addition to the municipalities as basic territorial political subdivisions, a number of other local subdivisions exist in several cantons. These include:

- Bürgergemeinde (also: Burgergemeinde, Ortsgemeinde, Ortsbürgergemeinde, Tagwen, bourgeoisie, commune bourgeoise, vischnanca burgaisa), a statutory corporation that includes everyone who is a citizen of a commune and has the Heimatrecht (home right) in that commune regardless of where they may currently live. Until the 19th century this Heimatrecht included rights to use the commons, which were administered by the Bürgergemeinde. Modernly, some Bürgergemeinden may still control common property, but the Heimatrecht and associated Heimatort is used just as place of birth in other countries.
- Gemischte Gemeinde (mixed communes), found in the Canton of Jura and portions of the Canton of Bern, a combination of a Bürgergemeinde and a political commune.
- Korporationsgemeinde, a legally recognized cooperative in Central Switzerland that controls some land and is responsible for its members support.
- Kirchgemeinde, a parish for members of a large church (generally Roman Catholic or Swiss Reformed). There may be two or more Kirchgemeinden in a single municipality.
- Schulgemeinde, similar to a school district.
- Bäuert, in the Berner Oberland or Graubünden) a small farming community. It is a type of agricultural cooperative with shared equipment and land.
- Degagna, in the Leventina valley in the Canton of Ticino. It manages shared pastures, fields and woods as well as maintaining roads that cross the common land.

== See also ==
- List of municipalities of Switzerland
- List of twin towns and sister cities in Switzerland
- Flags and arms of municipalities of Switzerland
- Former municipalities of Switzerland
- Cantons of Switzerland
- Spatial planning in Switzerland
