= Bettmeralp =

- Municipality
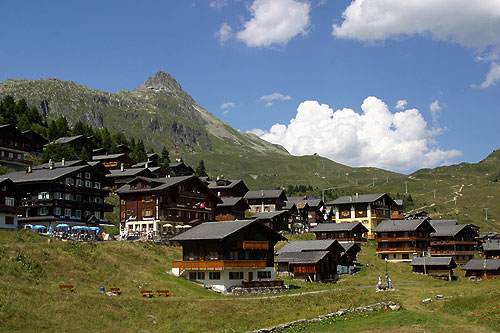
- Bettmeralp village and Bettmerhorn

- Flag Coat of arms
- Location of Bettmeralp
- Location within Switzerland Location within Canton of Valais
- Coordinates: 46°23′N 8°5′E
- Country: Switzerland
- Canton: Valais
- District: Raron

Area
  - Total: 29.36 km^{2} (11.34 sq mi)
- Elevation: 1,970 m (6,460 ft)

Population (Dec 2011)
  - Total: 440
  - Density: 15/km^{2} (39/sq mi)
- Time zone: UTC+01:00 (CET)
  - Summer (DST): UTC+02:00 (CEST)
- Postal codes: 3991 & 3994
- SFOS number: 6205
- ISO 3166 code: CH-VS
- Surrounded by: Fiesch, Fieschertal, Filet, Grengiols, Lax, Martisberg, Naters, Riederalp
- Website: gemeinde.bettmeralp.ch

Bettmeralp is a municipality in the district of Raron in the canton of Valais in Switzerland. On 1 January 2014 the former municipalities of Betten and Martisberg merged into the municipality of Bettmeralp. Before the merger, Bettmeralp was the name of a village and ski resort in Betten.

== Bettmeralp village ==
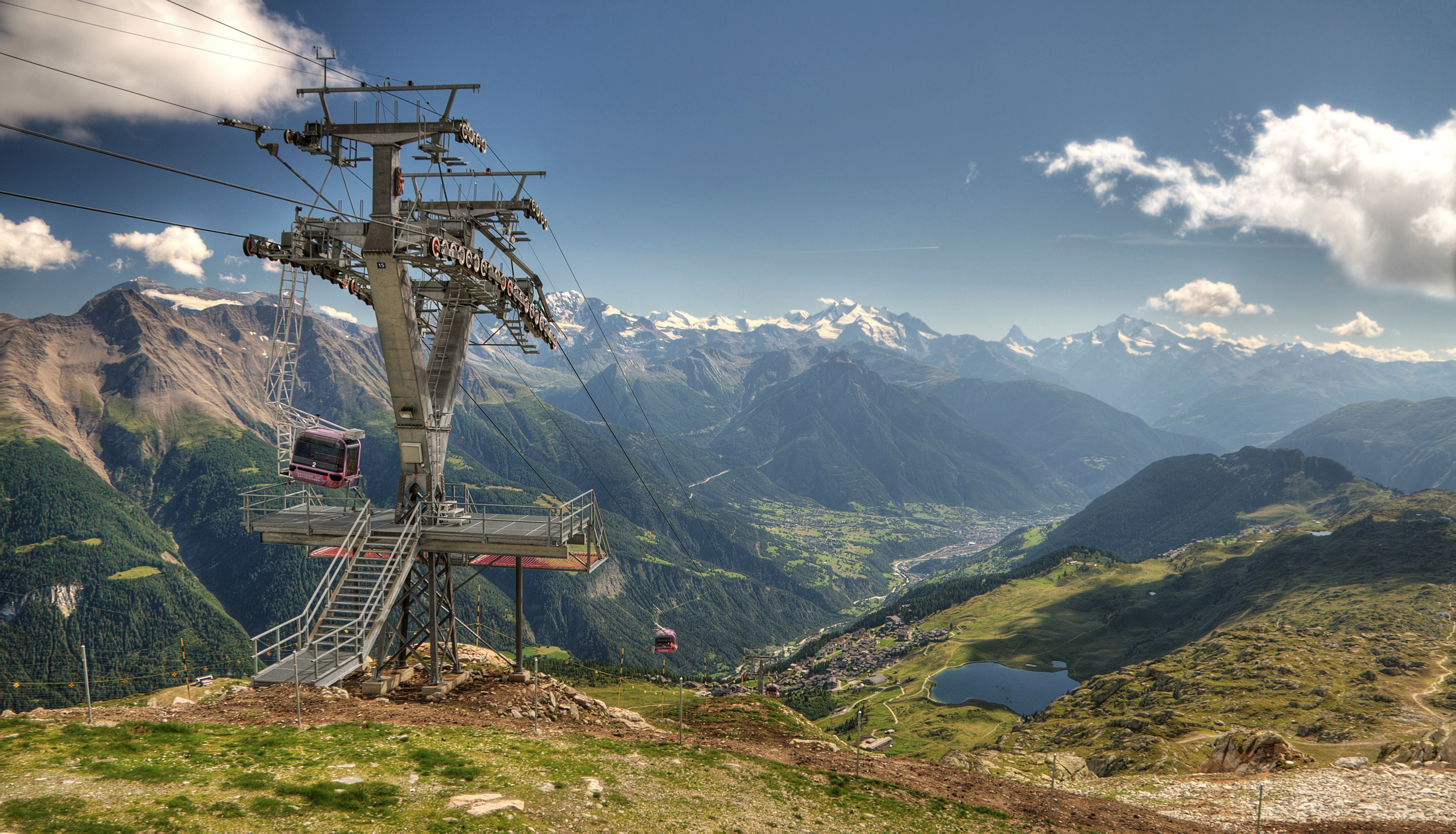
Above Bettmeralp

Bettmeralp is a car free village which can be reached by cable car from the Bettmeralp train station (Matterhorn Gotthard Bahn). From there another cable car leads near to the summit of Bettmerhorn, which lies directly above the Aletsch Glacier. Bettmersee is located above the village at 2006 m.

The position of Bettmeralp allows good view over the Pennine Alps, particularly the summits of Weissmies, Dom, Matterhorn and Weisshorn.

Historic aerial photograph by Werner Friedli from 1949

== History ==
Betten is first mentioned in 1243 as Bettan. Martisberg is first mentioned in 1311 as Martisperg.

== Geography ==
The former municipalities that now make up Bettmeralp have a total combined area of 28.79 km^{2} (11.12 sq mi).

== Demographics ==
The total population of Bettmeralp (as of December 2020) is 452.

== Historic population ==
The historical population is given in the following chart:

== Sights ==
The entire hamlet of Eggen is designated as part of the Inventory of Swiss Heritage Sites.

== Skilift system ==
Bettmeralp village can only be reached via a cable car. The main ski lifts are:

Name or route	type	elevation groundstation	elevation mountainstation	slope length	capacity in persons/hour	construction year(s)
Betten; Betten Village	aerial tramway	832	1199	872	350	1950; 1965
Betten Village; Bettmeralp	aerial tramway	1199	1931	1610	500	1951; 1967; 1979
Betten; Bettmeralp	aerial tramway	832	1933	2446	970	1974
Bettmeralp; Bettmerhorn	gondola	1991	2652	2324	2400	1975; 1995
Wurzenbord	chairlift	1966	2224	1075	2000	2003
Schönbiel	chairlift	1956	2296	1669	2800	1998
Alpmatten 1	surface lift	1861	1951	294	650	1971
Alpmatten 2	surface lift	1861	1951	294	650	1971
Schräglift Alpmatten	inclined lift	1920	1950	130	100	2000
Bettmeralp 1	surface lift	1940	2067	640	1000	1972; 1955
Bettmeralp 2	surface lift	1940	2067	640	1000	1971
Tanzbode	surface lift	1985	2016	488	720	1995; 1992:Temporary lift
Trainerlift	surface lift	1974	2026	303	820	1983; 1st trainer:1969
Lager 1	surface lift	1974	2035	336	1000	1983
Lager 2	surface lift	1974	2022	223	720	1999

== Panorama ==
The village:

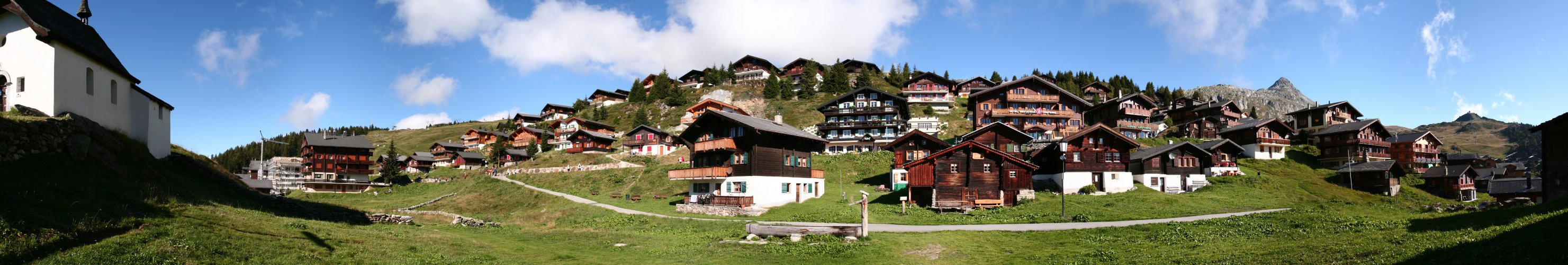

View from the village:

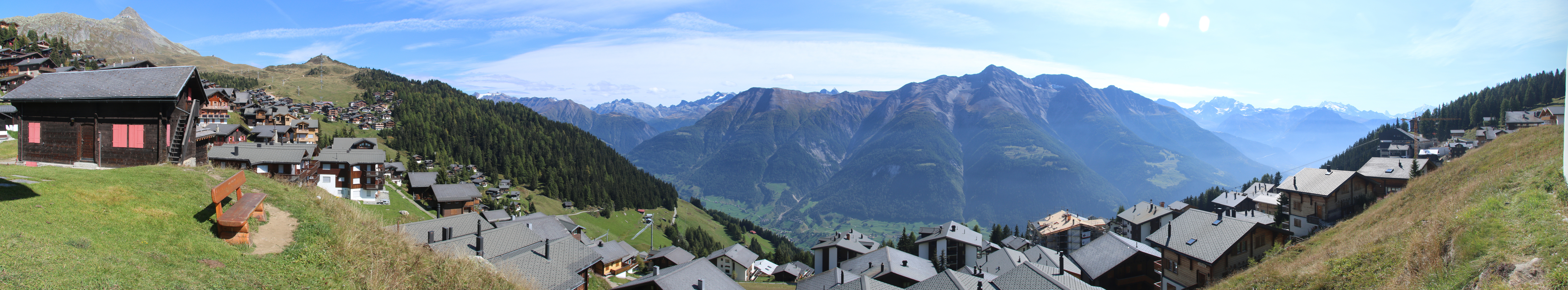
