= Fiesch derailment =

Train wreck

Coordinates: 46.403007°N 8.132672°E

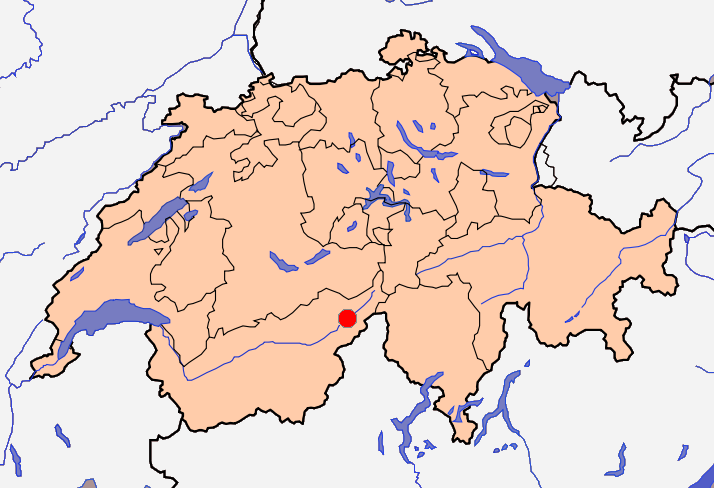
- Location of the derailment in Switzerland

Details
- Date: 23 July 2010
- Location: Fiesch
- Country: Switzerland
- Operator: Matterhorn Gotthard Bahn
- Incident type: derailment

Statistics
- Trains: 1
- Deaths: 1
- Injured: 40

The Fiesch derailment occurred on Friday 23 July 2010, at 11:50 CET when a Glacier Express train, from Zermatt heading towards St. Moritz, derailed at low speed between the cities of Lax and Fiesch, Canton Valais, Switzerland.

Two rear panorama cars were overturned while a third car derailed but remained on the track.

A 64-year-old Japanese woman was killed and 42 people were injured and taken to hospital. The day after the accident 17 persons (16 Japanese, 1 Spanish) were still in hospital care.

The cause of the accident was blamed on human error in that the driver was going too fast. Traffic resumed on Sunday 25 July after repair and the railway had been declared safe by the Matterhorn Gotthard Bahn (operator of the Glacier Express).

On 7 March 2011, it was announced that the driver of the train at the time of its crash had been convicted of homicide and negligence, and would face a fine of 15,000 Swiss francs.

The Investigation Bureau for Railway, Funicular and Boat Accidents investigated the accident.
