= Ausserbinn =

- Former municipality
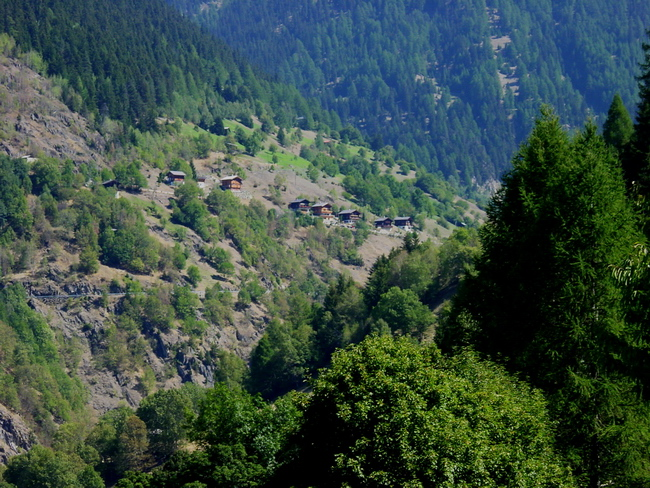

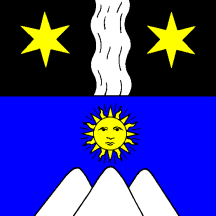
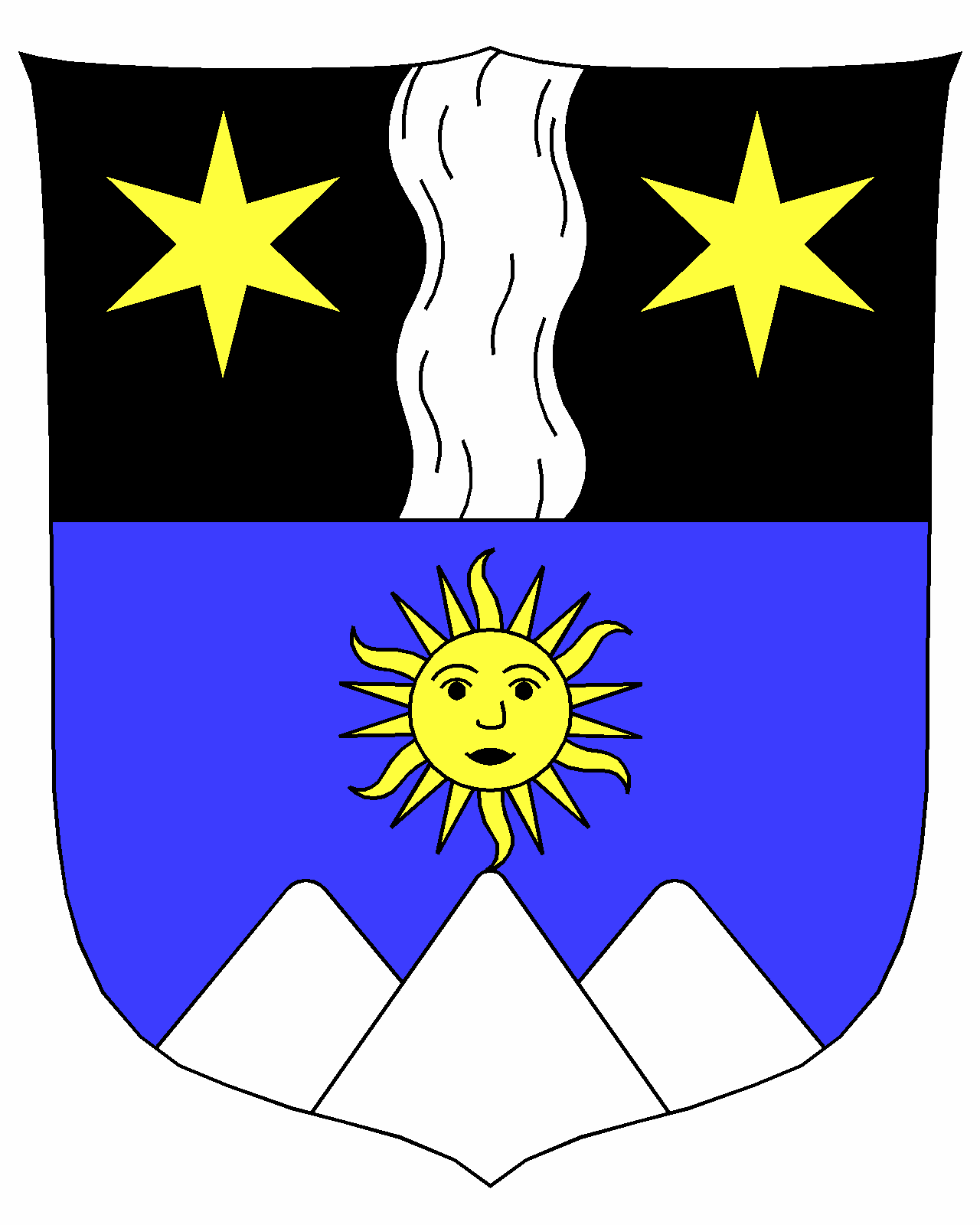
- Flag Coat of arms
- Location of Ausserbinn
- Location within Switzerland Location within Canton of Valais
- Coordinates: 46°23′N 8°9′E
- Country: Switzerland
- Canton: Valais
- District: Goms
- Municipality: Ernen

Area
  - Total: 4.5 km^{2} (1.7 sq mi)
- Elevation: 1,304 m (4,278 ft)

Population (2000)
  - Total: 47
  - Density: 10/km^{2} (27/sq mi)
- Time zone: UTC+01:00 (CET)
  - Summer (DST): UTC+02:00 (CEST)
- Postal code: 3995
- SFOS number: 6051
- ISO 3166 code: CH-VS
- Website: www.ausserbinn.ch

Ausserbinn is a former municipality of the canton of Valais, Switzerland, and now part of the municipality of Ernen. Prior to its incorporation within Ernen, it was one of Switzerland's smallest municipalities with a population of only 47 as of 2000.

The village covers a total area of 4.5 km² and ranges in elevation from 1100 m to 2500 m on the mountain of Eggerhorn. The centre lies at 1300 m above sea level. Ausserbinn is situated in the Binn Valley, well known for its abundant flora and minerals.

A Postbus route connects Ausserbinn to the railway station at Fiesch.

== Merger ==
In a referendum held on 5 November 2002, 19 opposed and 14 voted in favour of a union with the neighbouring municipalities of Ernen, Mühlebach, and Steinhaus. Despite the vote, the cantonal authorities pressed ahead with plans for the merger, declaring that the municipalities would be merged on 1 October 2004. A legal appeal by the inhabitants to the Federal Supreme Court of Switzerland was unsuccessful and in spring 2005 Ausserbinn became part of Ernen.
