= Schräglift Alpmatten =

Funicular at Bettmeralp, Valais, Switzerland

Overview
- Other name(s): Schräglift Mieschgihalta
- Status: In operation
- Owner: Aletsch Bahnen AG (since 2017); Schräglift Mieschgihalta AG (2000–2005/2006), Bettmeralp Bahnen AG (2005/2006–2017, name change)
- Locale: Bettmeralp, Valais, Switzerland
- Termini: Alpmatten; St. Michaels Zentrum
- Stations: 2

Service
- Type: Funicular (inclined elevator)
- Rolling stock: 1
- Ridership: capacity: 105 persons/hour

History
- Opened: 9 December 2000 (24 years ago)

Technical
- Line length: 133 m (436 ft)
- Number of tracks: 1
- Electrification: from opening
- Operating speed: 1.8 metres per second (5.9 ft/s)
- Highest elevation: 1,935 m (6,348 ft)

Schräglift Alpmatten is a funicular at Bettmeralp in the canton of Valais, Switzerland. It leads from the Alpmatten neighborhood at 1870 m to the centre of the car-free resort Bettmeralp at 1935 m. The single-cabin line functions with a counterweight. It has a length of 133 m and a difference of elevation of 65 m.

It is operated by Aletsch Bahnen AG. Journey time is 1.47 minutes.

== History ==
Alpmatten is located below the centre of the car-free village of Bettmeralp. While other installations provided access for skiers, the Schräglift ("inclined lift") was proposed for non-skiers, seniors, and families with children by a transport commission set up in autumn 1996. A bus line, a chair lift, and a covered escalator were considered as alternatives.

The assembly of the municipality of Betten approved the project in 1998, despite opposition favoring expansion of the existing installations.

For the construction, the company Schräglift Mieschgihalta AG (Note: initially "gi" were inverted) was formed on 3 July 2000. Shares were subscribed by the municipality of Betten, Bettmeralp Bahnen, and local residents and businesses.

The lift was built by Garaventa and inaugurated on 9 December 2000.

In 2005/2006, Bettmeralp Bahnen AG took over the line. After a merger, the company was named Aletsch Bahnen AG.
