= SII =

SII may be an acronym of:

- Chartered Institute for Securities & Investment (Securities & Investment Institute), a London-based professional and training body
- Investigation Bureau for Railway, Funicular and Boat Accidents (Servizio d’inchiesta sugli infortuni dei trasporti pubblici), a Swiss Government accident and incident investigation agency
- Seiko Instruments Inc., one of three core companies of the Seiko Group
- Serum Institute of India (SII) is an Indian biotechnology and bio-pharmaceuticals company.
- Silicon Image Inc., a manufacturer of wireless and wired connectivity products used for high-definition content
- Smith International Inc., New York Stock Exchange ticker symbol
- Speech transmission index (Speech intelligibility index), a way to measure the understandability of speech for a listener in different conditions (noise, hearing loss, etc.)
- Standards Institution of Israel, the national standard-setting organization of Israel and an ISO member organization
- Strong Interest Inventory, one of the most popular career assessment tools

or it may refer to

- Secondary somatosensory cortex (S2), a functionally defined region in the brain's parietal cortex
- Samsung Galaxy S II, or Samsung Galaxy S2, the successor to the Samsung Galaxy S
- Solvency II, a European directive to harmonise insurance regulation
