= Swiss Transportation Safety Investigation Board =

Government agency of Switzerland

- (in German) Schweizerische Sicherheitsuntersuchungsstelle (in French) Service suisse d'enquête de securité (in Italian) Servizio d'inchiesta svizzero sulla sicurezza (in Romansh) Servetsch svizzer d'inquisiziun da segirtad

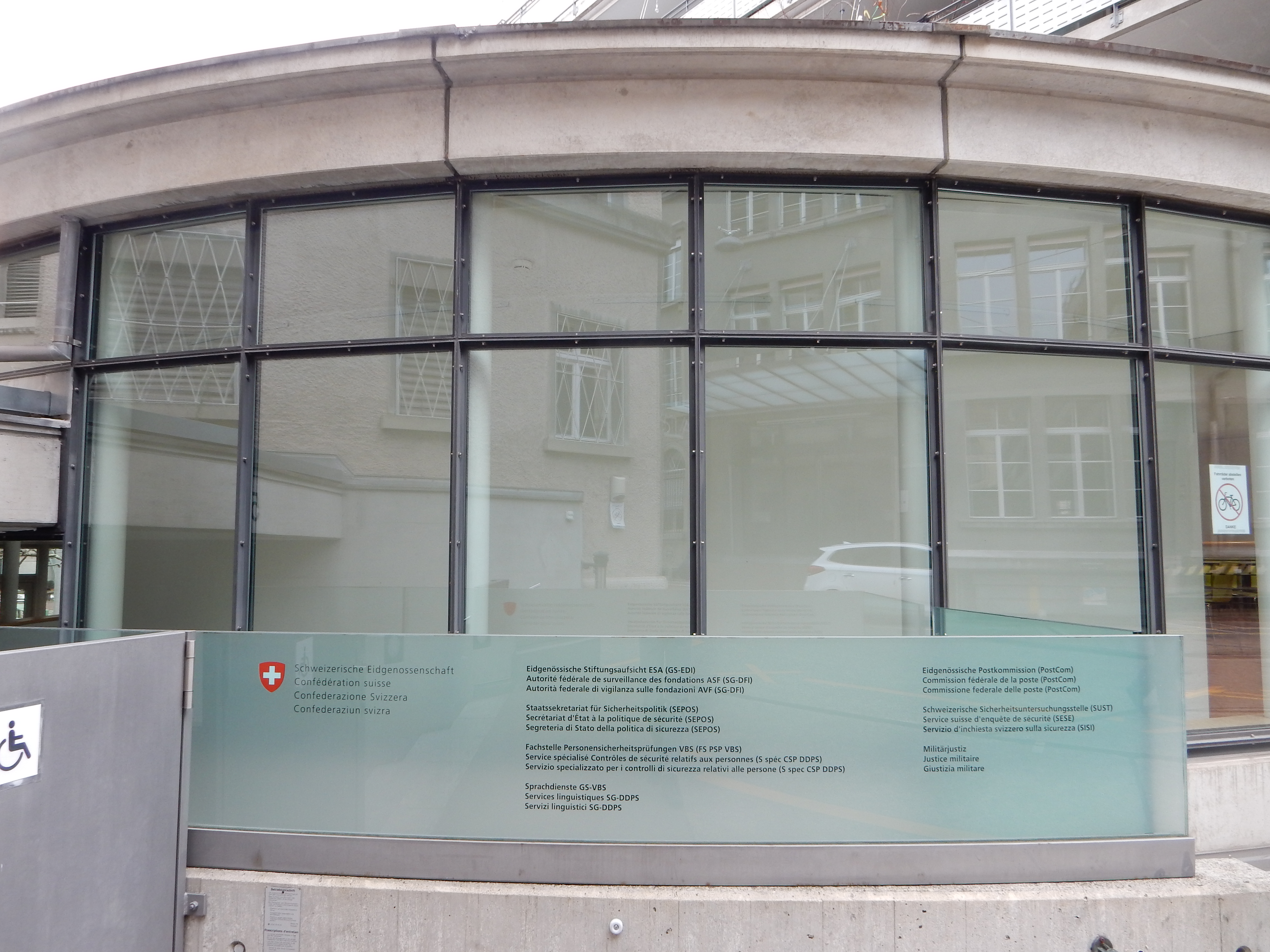
- Offices of the STSB Rail/Navigation Division in Bern

Agency overview
- Formed: 2011
- Jurisdiction: Federal administration of Switzerland
- Minister responsible: Albert Rösti, Federal Councillor
- Parent agency: Federal Department of Environment, Transport, Energy and Communications
- Website: www.sust.admin.ch

The Swiss Transportation Safety Investigation Board (STSB, German: Schweizerische Sicherheitsuntersuchungsstelle (SUST); French: Service suisse d'enquête de securité (SESA); Italian: Servizio d'inchiesta svizzero sulla sicurezza (SISI), Romansh: Survetsch svizzer d'inquisiziun da segirtad (SISE)) is a government agency of Switzerland. It investigates civil aviation accidents and incidents and cableway, roadway, waterway, and railway accidents. The head office is in Bern. The aviation division is based at Payerne Airport in Payerne and the rail/navigation division is based in Bern.

== History ==
The Swiss Accident Investigation Board (SAIB, German: Schweizerische Unfalluntersuchungsstelle (SUST); French: Service d'enquête suisse sur les accidents (SESA); Italian: Servizio d’inchiesta svizzero sugli infortuni (SISI)) was established on 1 November 2011 when the Aircraft Accident Investigation Bureau and the Investigation Bureau for Railway, Funicular and Boat Accidents merged. On 1 February 2015 the name was changed to its current name.
