= Aircraft Accident Investigation Bureau (Switzerland) =

Swiss Aviation Safety Agency

Aircraft Accident Investigation Bureau (AAIB, German: Büro für Flugunfalluntersuchungen, BFU; French: Bureau d'enquête sur les accidents d'aviation, BEAA; Italian: Ufficio d'inchiesta sugli infortuni aeronautici, UIIA) was the Swiss bureau of aircraft accident investigation. In 2011, it was replaced by the Swiss Transportation Safety Investigation Board.

== History ==
The Aircraft Accident Investigation Bureau was established by the Swiss parliament. Operations began in 1960. The bureau was headquartered on the grounds of Payerne Airport and in Payerne.

Normally the original aircraft accident reports were written in the language of the Swiss region where the aircraft accident occurred. Some reports had English versions available.

The agency was disestablished on 1 November 2011 when it and the Investigation Bureau for Railway, Funicular and Boat Accidents merged to form the Swiss Accident Investigation Board.

== See also ==
- Crossair Flight 498
- Crossair Flight 3597
- Investigation Bureau for Railway, Funicular and Boat Accidents
