= Bettmersee =

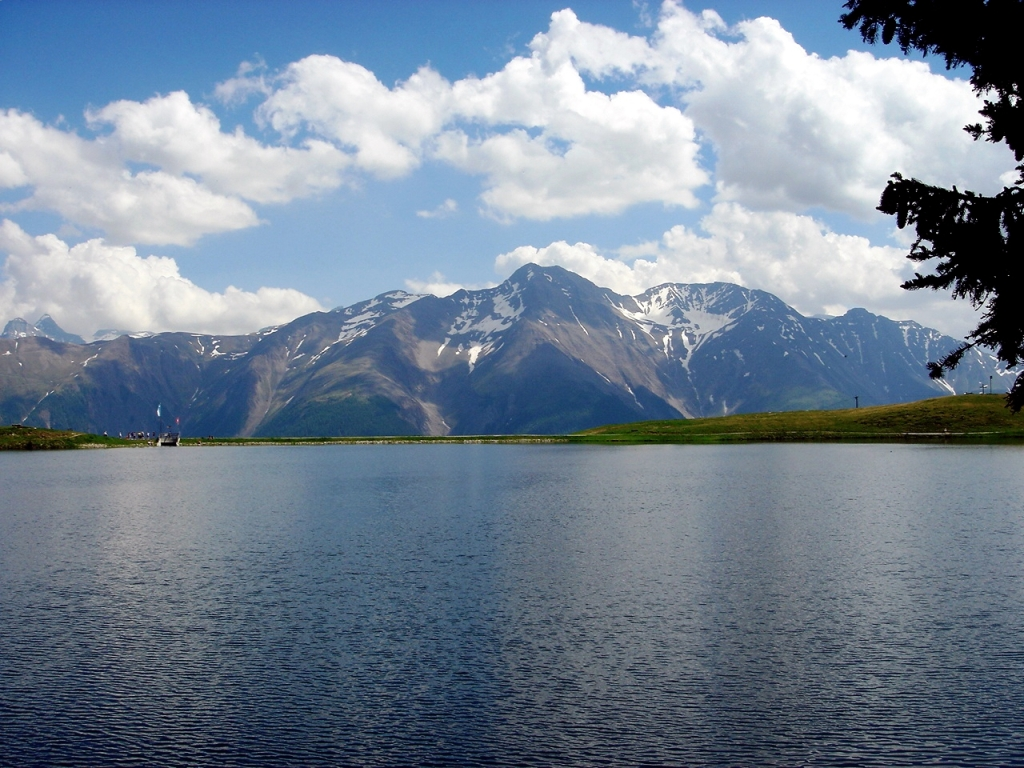

- Location within Canton of Valais Location within Switzerland Location within Alps
- Interactive map of Bettmersee
- Location: Bettmeralp, Valais
- Coordinates: 46°23′35″N 8°3′44″E
- Type: artificial lake
- Basin countries: Switzerland
- Surface area: 5.5 ha (14 acres)
- Surface elevation: 2,006 m (6,581 ft)

Bettmersee is a lake above Bettmeralp in the canton of Valais, Switzerland. Its surface area of 5.5 hectares (14 acres) is located at an elevation of 2,006 metres (6,581 ft).

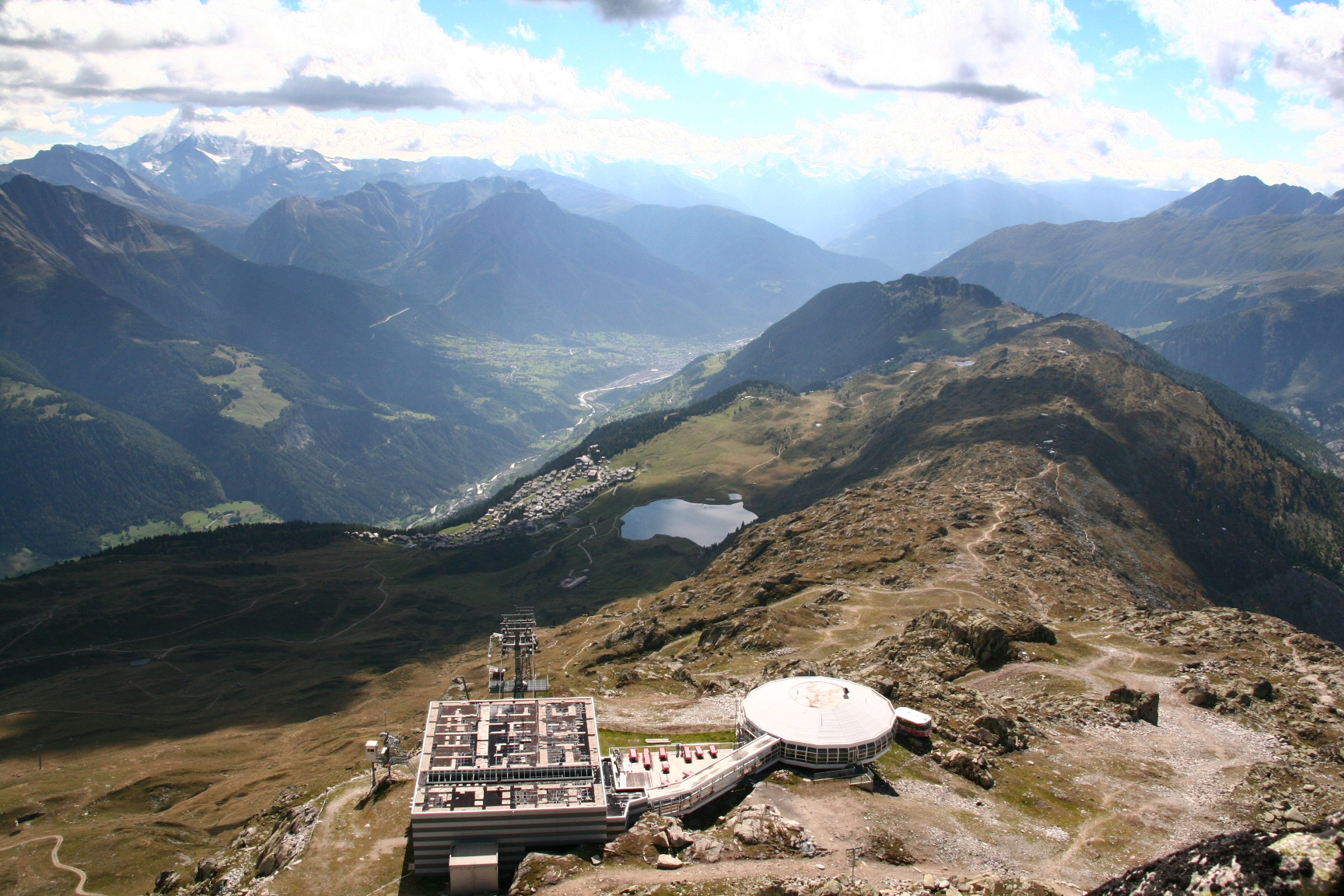
Bettmeralp and Bettmersee from Bettmerhorn.

== See also ==
- List of mountain lakes of Switzerland
