= Ernen =

- Municipality
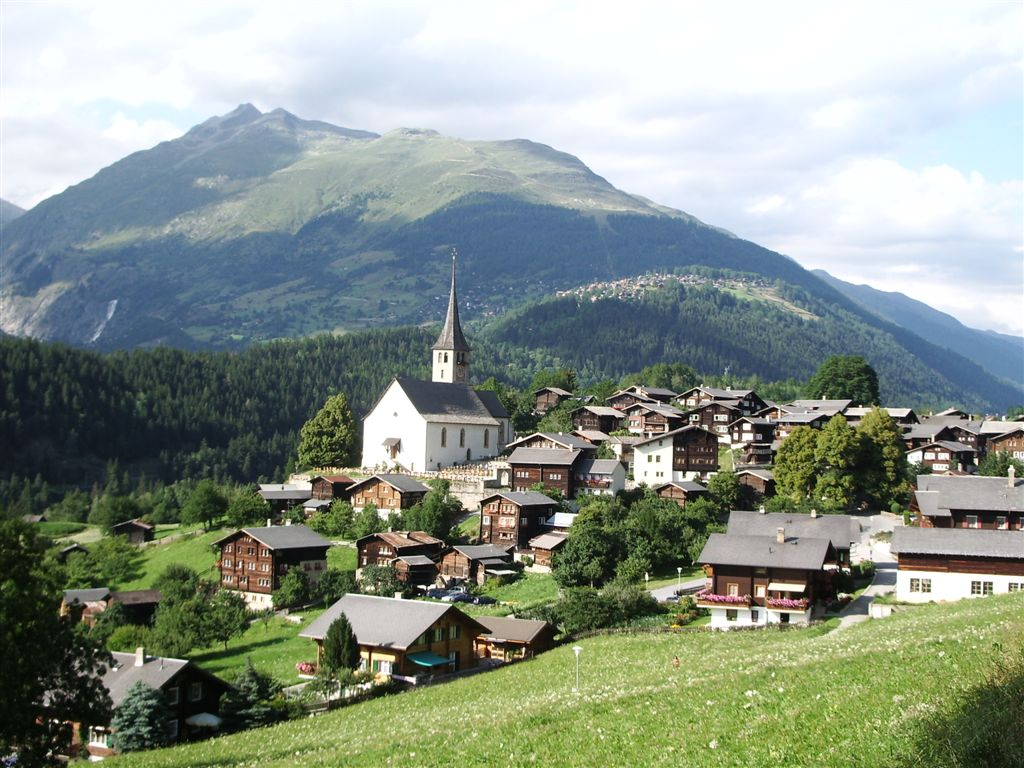

- Flag Coat of arms
- Location of Ernen
- Location within Switzerland Location within Canton of Valais
- Coordinates: 46°24′N 8°9′E
- Country: Switzerland
- Canton: Valais
- District: Goms

Government
  - Mayor: Francesco Walter

Area
  - Total: 35.4 km^{2} (13.7 sq mi)
- Elevation: 1,196 m (3,924 ft)

Population (August 2005)
  - Total: 557
  - Density: 15.7/km^{2} (40.8/sq mi)
- Time zone: UTC+01:00 (CET)
  - Summer (DST): UTC+02:00 (CEST)
- Postal code: 3995
- SFOS number: 6056
- ISO 3166 code: CH-VS
- Surrounded by: Bellwald, Binn, Blitzingen, Fiesch, Grafschaft, Grengiols, Lax, Niederwald, Reckingen-Gluringen
- Website: www.ernen.ch

Ernen is a municipality in the district of Goms in the canton of Valais in Switzerland. In 2005 Ernen incorporated the formerly independent municipalities of Ausserbinn, Mühlebach, and Steinhaus.

In 1979, Ernen was awarded the Wakker Prize for the preservation of its architectural heritage.

== History ==
Ernen is first mentioned in 1214 as Aragnon. In 1220 it was mentioned as Arengnon and in 1510 it was Aernen.

Historic aerial photograph by Werner Friedli from 1955

== Geography ==
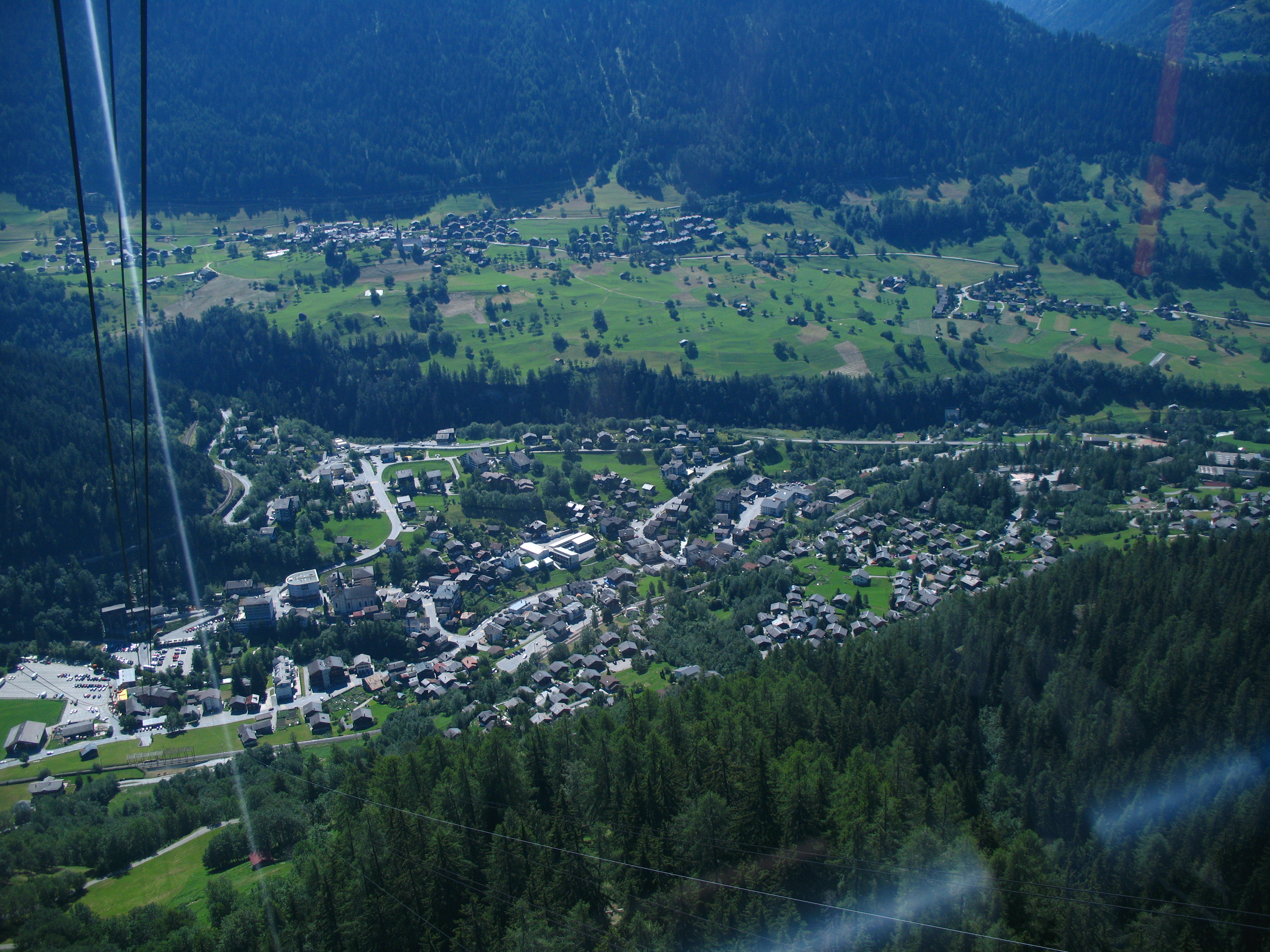
Ernen and Fiesch viewed from Fiescheralp

Ernen has an area, as of 2011, of 35.4 square kilometers (13.7 mi^{2}). Of this area, 36.1% is used for agricultural purposes, while 35.4% is forested. Of the rest of the land, 1.5% is settled (buildings or roads) and 27.0% is unproductive land.

The municipality is located on a moraine terrace above the left side of the Rhone. It consists of the village of Ernen and the hamlet of Niederernen.

On 1 October 2004 the former municipalities of Steinhaus, Ausserbinn and Mühlebach merged into the municipality of Ernen, keeping the name Ernen.

== Coat of arms ==
The blazon of the municipal coat of arms is Per pale Gules and Argent, two Greek Crosses couped palewise counterchanged.

== Demographics ==
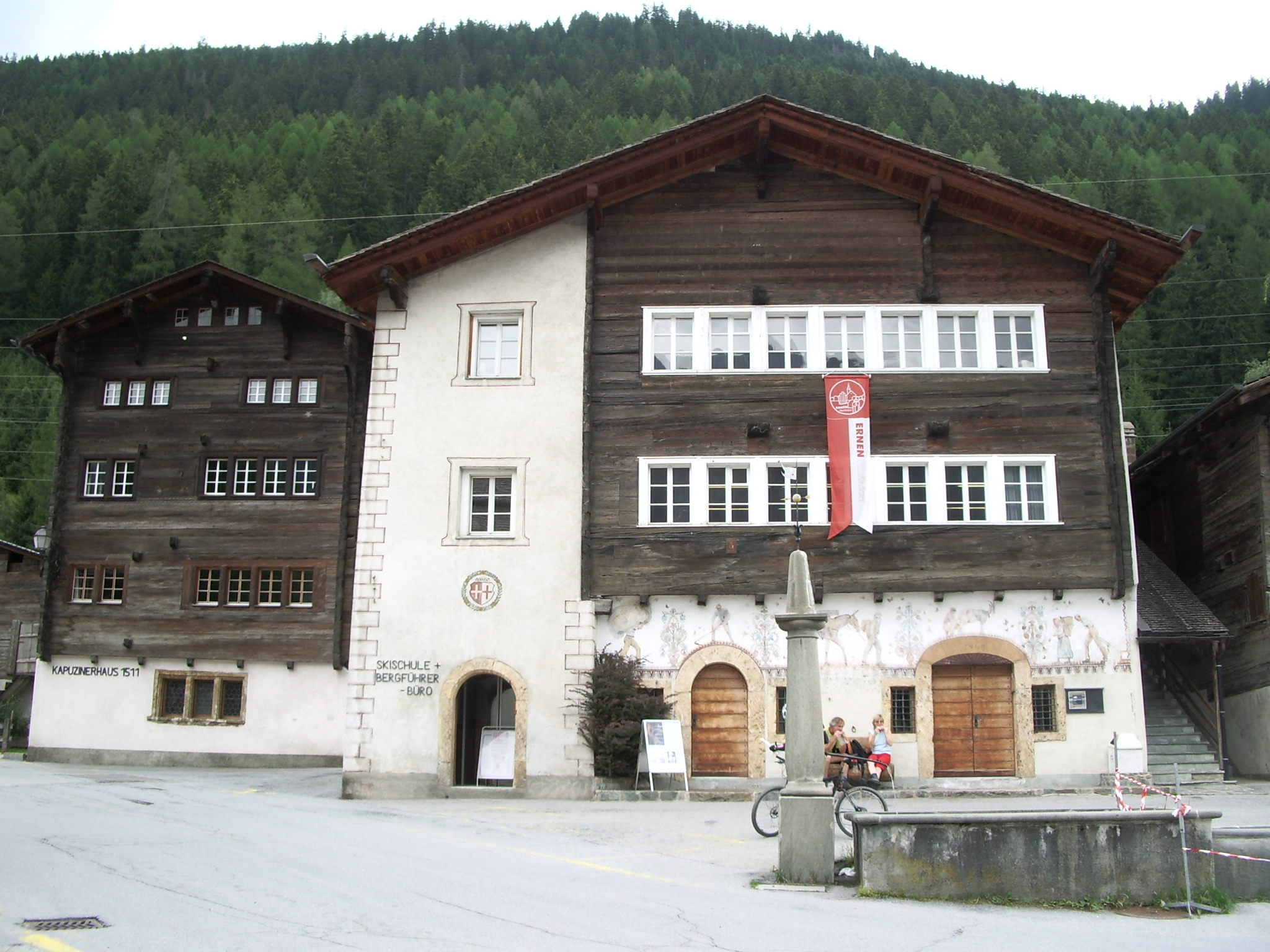
Capuchin house in Ernen

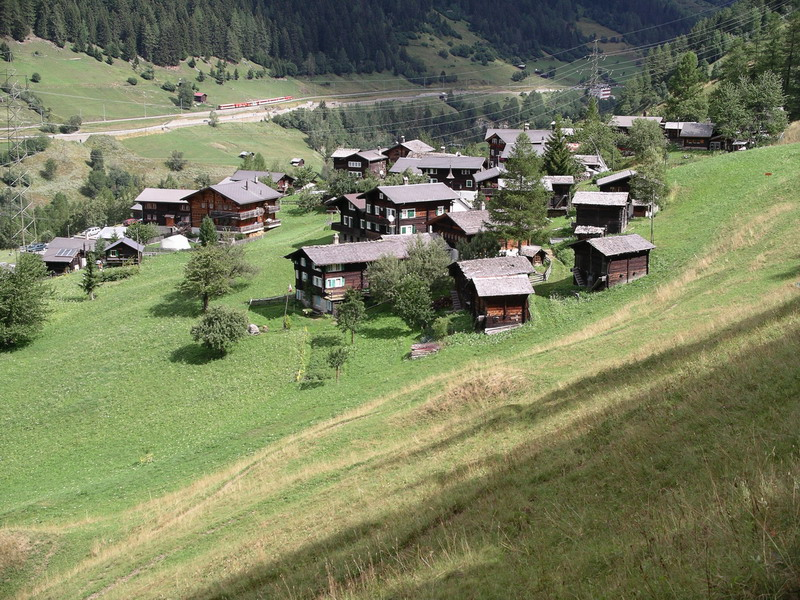
Steinhaus village

Ernen has a population (as of December 2020) of 518. In 2008, 5.2% of the population were resident foreign nationals. Over the 10 years 1999–2009, the population changed at a rate of -8.3%. It has changed at a rate of 0% due to migration and at a rate of -7.1% due to births and deaths.

Most of the population in 2000 spoke German (367 or 95.3%) as their first language, Serbo-Croatian is the second most common (5 or 1.3%) and Dutch is the third (3 or 0.8%). There are 2 people who speak French, 1 person who speaks Italian.

In 2008, the sex distribution of the population was 50.1% male and 49.9% female. The population was made up of 252 Swiss men (47.8% of the population) and 12 (2.3%) non-Swiss men. There were 245 Swiss women (46.5%) and 18 (3.4%) non-Swiss women. Of the population in the municipality, 207 or about 53.8% were born in Ernen and lived there in 2000. There were 97 or 25.2% who were born in the same canton, while 48 or 12.5% were born somewhere else in Switzerland, and 26 or 6.8% born outside of Switzerland.

The age distribution of the population in 2000 wa children and teenagers (0–19 years old) make up 25.6% of the population, while adults (20–64 years old) make up 56.8% and seniors (over 64 years old) make up 17.6%.

In 2000, there were 162 people who were single and never married in the municipality. There were 186 married individuals, 26 widows or widowers and 11 individuals who were divorced.

In 2000, there were 231 private households in the municipality, and an average of 2.3 persons per household. There were 64 households that consisted of only one person and 12 households with five or more people. Of a total of 172 households that answered this question, 37.2% were households made up of just one person and there were 2 adults who lived with their parents. Of the rest of the households, there were 33 married couples without children, 54 married couples with children There were 11 single parents with a child or children. There were 4 households that were made up of unrelated people and 4 households that were made up of some sort of institution or another collective housing.

In 2000, there were 81 single family homes (or 33.9% of the total) out of a total of 239 inhabited buildings. There were 130 multi-family buildings (54.4%), along with 12 multi-purpose buildings that were mostly used for housing (5.0%) and 16 other use buildings (commercial or industrial) that also had some housing (6.7%).

In 2000, 163 apartments (29.0% of the total) were permanently occupied, while 285 apartments (50.6%) were seasonally occupied and 115 apartments (20.4%) were empty. In 2009, the construction rate of new housing units was 3.8 new units per 1000 residents. The vacancy rate for the municipality, in 2010, was 1.7%.

The historical population is given in the following chart:

== Heritage sites of national significance ==
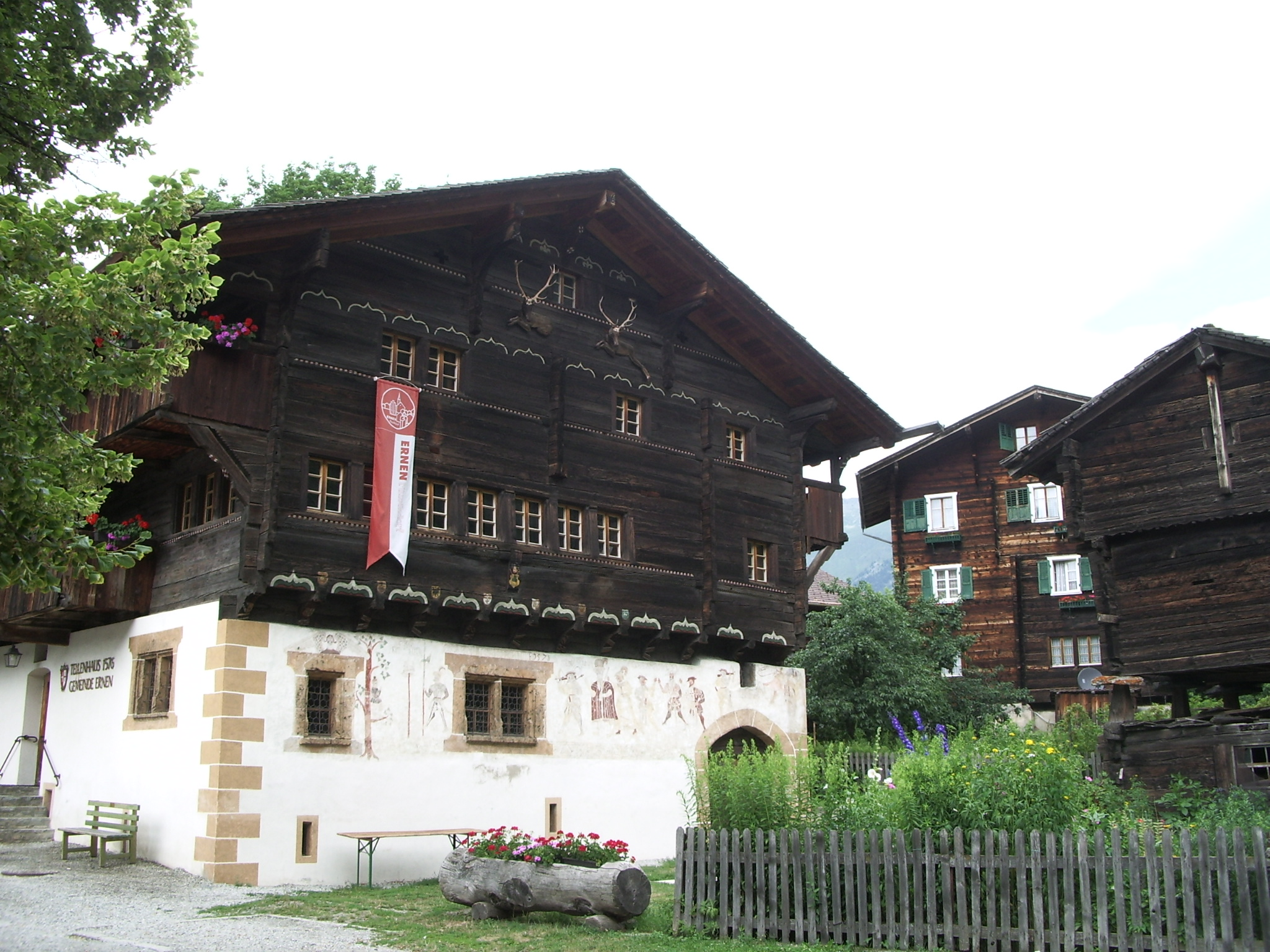
Tellen House

The Erner Galgen, the Jost-Sigristen House, and the Tellen House are listed as Swiss heritage site of national significance. The entire village of Ernen is part of the Inventory of Swiss Heritage Sites.

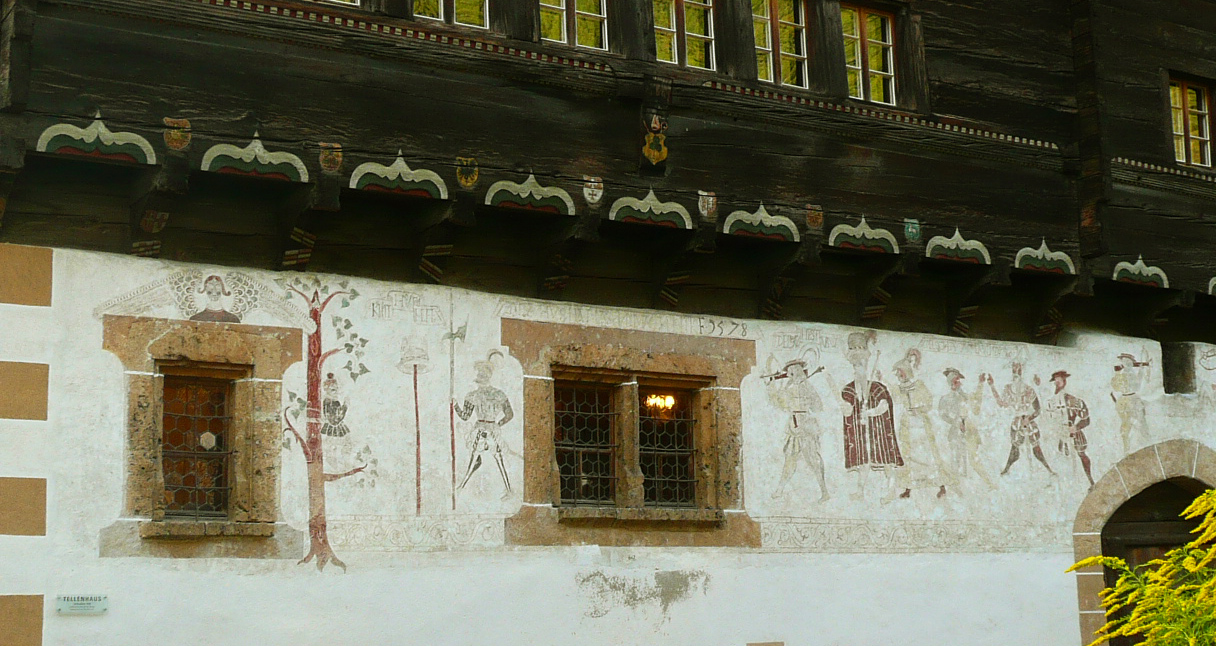
Fresco dated 1578

== Politics ==
In the 2007 federal election the most popular party was the CVP which received 52.6% of the vote. The next three most popular parties were the SVP (19.58%), the SP (17.28%) and the Green Party (4.67%). In the federal election, a total of 204 votes were cast, and the voter turnout was 46.9%.

In the 2009 Conseil d'Etat/Staatsrat election a total of 191 votes were cast, of which 27 or about 14.1% were invalid. The voter participation was 45.7%, which is much less than the cantonal average of 54.67%. In the 2007 Swiss Council of States election a total of 204 votes were cast, of which 6 or about 2.9% were invalid. The voter participation was 46.9%, which is much less than the cantonal average of 59.88%.

== Economy ==
As of 2010, Ernen had an unemployment rate of 0.3%. As of 2008, there were 30 people employed in the primary economic sector and about 14 businesses involved in this sector. 35 people were employed in the secondary sector and there were 7 businesses in this sector. 108 people were employed in the tertiary sector, with 26 businesses in this sector. There were 175 residents of the municipality who were employed in some capacity, of which females made up 35.4% of the workforce.

In 2008 the total number of full-time equivalent jobs was 142. The number of jobs in the primary sector was 23, of which 18 were in agriculture and 5 were in forestry or lumber production. The number of jobs in the secondary sector was 32 of which 1 was in manufacturing and 9 (28.1%) were in construction. The number of jobs in the tertiary sector was 87. In the tertiary sector; 18 or 20.7% were in wholesale or retail sales or the repair of motor vehicles, 7 or 8.0% were in the movement and storage of goods, 41 or 47.1% were in a hotel or restaurant, 6 or 6.9% were technical professionals or scientists, 2 or 2.3% were in education and 3 or 3.4% were in health care.

In 2000, there were 62 workers who commuted into the municipality and 82 workers who commuted away. The municipality is a net exporter of workers, with about 1.3 workers leaving the municipality for every one entering. Of the working population, 8.8% used public transportation to get to work, and 55% used a private car.

== Religion ==
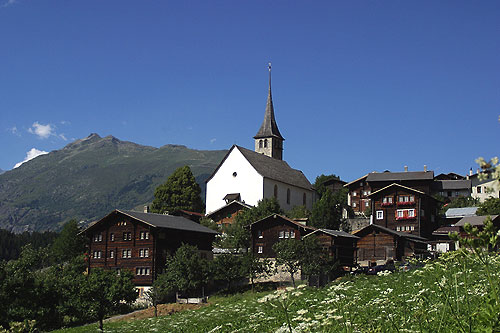
Parish church of St. Georg

From the 2000 census, 337 or 87.5% were Roman Catholic, while 25 or 6.5% belonged to the Swiss Reformed Church. Of the rest of the population, there were 7 individuals (or about 1.82% of the population) who belonged to another Christian church. 14 (or about 3.64% of the population) belonged to no church, are agnostic or atheist, and 5 individuals (or about 1.30% of the population) did not answer the question.

== Education ==
In Ernen about 130 or (33.8%) of the population have completed non-mandatory upper secondary education, and 38 or (9.9%) have completed additional higher education (either university or a Fachhochschule). Of the 38 who completed tertiary schooling, 71.1% were Swiss men, 13.2% were Swiss women.

During the 2010-2011 school year there were a total of 19 students in the Ernen school system. The education system in the Canton of Valais allows young children to attend one year of non-obligatory Kindergarten. During that school year, there were no kindergarten classes (KG1 or KG2) and there were no kindergarten students. The canton's school system requires students to attend six years of primary school. In Ernen there were a total of 2 classes and 19 students in the primary school. The secondary school program consists of three lower, obligatory years of schooling (orientation classes), followed by three to five years of optional, advanced schools. All the lower and upper secondary students from Ernen attend their school in a neighboring municipality.

As of 2000, there were 44 students in Ernen who came from another municipality, while 29 residents attended schools outside the municipality.

== Cultural events ==
In 2016, Ernen hosts a musical festival (the 43rd edition) lasting most of July and August, with a widely varied program.
