= Martisberg =

- Former municipality
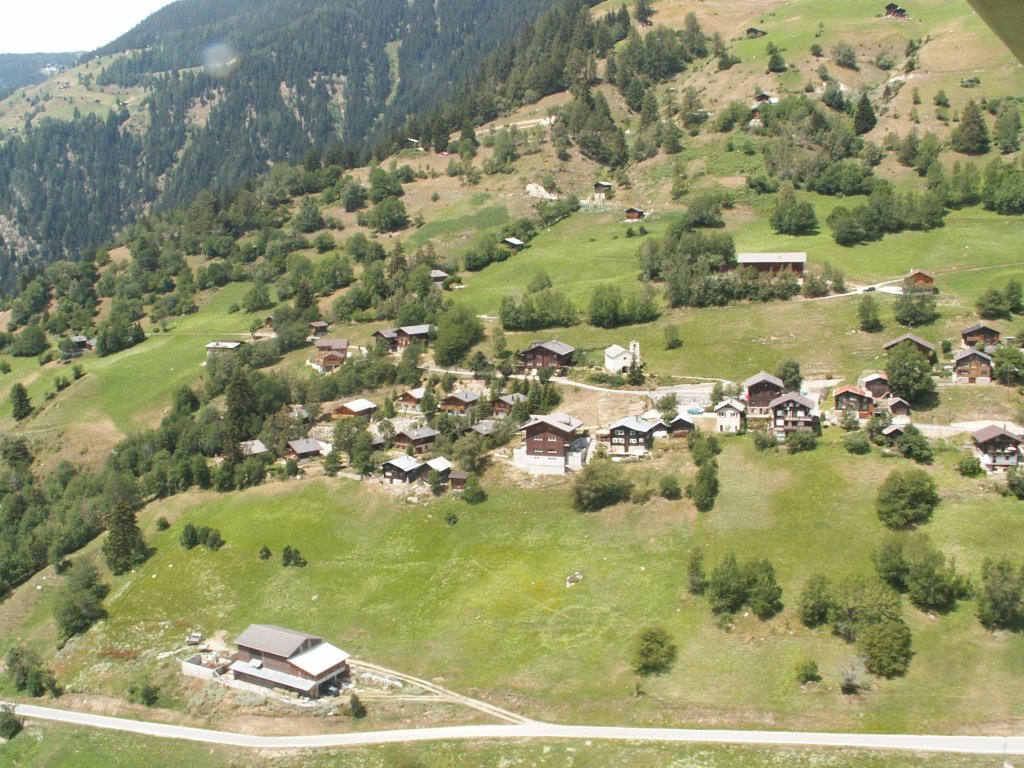

- Flag Coat of arms
- Location of Martisberg
- Location within Switzerland Location within Canton of Valais
- Coordinates: 46°23′N 8°5′E
- Country: Switzerland
- Canton: Valais
- District: Raron

Area
  - Total: 3.0 km^{2} (1.2 sq mi)
- Elevation: 1,367 m (4,485 ft)

Population (Dec 2011)
  - Total: 19
  - Density: 6.3/km^{2} (16/sq mi)
- Time zone: UTC+01:00 (CET)
  - Summer (DST): UTC+02:00 (CEST)
- Postal code: 3994
- SFOS number: 6178
- ISO 3166 code: CH-VS
- Surrounded by: Betten, Grengiols, Lax
- Website: SFSO statistics

Martisberg is a former municipality in the district of Raron in the canton of Valais in Switzerland. On 1 January 2014 the former municipalities of Martisberg and Betten merged into the new municipality of Bettmeralp.

== History ==
Martisberg is first mentioned in 1311 as Martisperg.

== Geography ==
Before the merger, Martisberg had a total area of 3.0 km^{2} (1.2 mi^{2}). Of this area, 42.2% is used for agricultural purposes, while 41.2% is forested. Of the rest of the land, 3.7% is settled (buildings or roads) and 13.0% is unproductive land.

The former municipality is located in the Östlich Raron district, on the northern slopes of the Rhone valley.

== Coat of arms ==
The blazon of the municipal coat of arms is Or a Sword Azure hilted Sable inverted in bend sinistre covered with a cloth Gules in base Coupeaux Vert.

== Demographics ==
Martisberg had a population (as of 2011) of 19. As of 2008, about 9.1% of the population are resident foreign nationals. Over the last 10 years (2000–2010 ) the population has changed at a rate of -26.7%. It has changed at a rate of 0% due to migration and at a rate of -20% due to births and deaths.

All of the population (as of 2000) speaks German.

As of 2008, the population was made up of 20 Swiss citizens. Of the population in the municipality, 23 or about 85.2% were born in Martisberg and lived there in 2000. There were 4 or 14.8% who were born in the same canton but not in Martisberg.

As of 2000, children and teenagers (0–19 years old) make up 25.9% of the population, while adults (20–64 years old) make up 48.1% and seniors (over 64 years old) make up 25.9%.

As of 2000, there were 13 people who were single and never married in the municipality. There were 12 married individuals and 2 widows or widowers.

As of 2000, there were 13 private households in the municipality, and an average of 2.1 persons per household. There were 7 households that consist of only one person and households with five or more people. In 2000, a total of 13 apartments (32.5% of the total) were permanently occupied, while 21 apartments (52.5%) were seasonally occupied and 6 apartments (15.0%) were empty.

The historical population is given in the following chart:

== Politics ==
In the 2007 federal election the most popular party was the CVP which received 70.68% of the vote. The next three most popular parties were the SP (14.29%), the FDP (9.02%) and the SVP (6.02%). In the federal election, a total of 19 votes were cast, and the voter turnout was 79.2%.

In the 2009 Conseil d'État/Staatsrat election a total of 16 votes were cast, of which or about 0.0% were invalid. The voter participation was 94.1%, which is much more than the cantonal average of 54.67%. In the 2007 Swiss Council of States election a total of 14 votes were cast. The voter participation was 77.8%, which is much more than the cantonal average of 59.88%.

== Economy ==
As of 2010, Martisberg had an unemployment rate of 0%. As of 2008, there were 4 people employed in the primary economic sector and about 2 businesses involved in this sector. No one was employed in the secondary sector or the tertiary sector. There were 12 residents of the municipality who were employed in some capacity, of which females made up 25.0% of the workforce.

In 2008 the total number of full-time equivalent jobs was 2, both in agriculture.

In 2000, there were 8 workers who commuted away from the municipality. Of the working population, 8.3% used public transportation to get to work, and 66.7% used a private car.

== Religion ==
From the 2000 census, 26 or 96.3% were Roman Catholic and there was 1 individual who belonged to another church.

== Education ==
In Martisberg about 8 or (29.6%) of the population have completed non-mandatory upper secondary education.

As of 2000, there were 5 students from Martisberg who attended schools outside the municipality.
