= Investigation Bureau for Railway, Funicular and Boat Accidents =

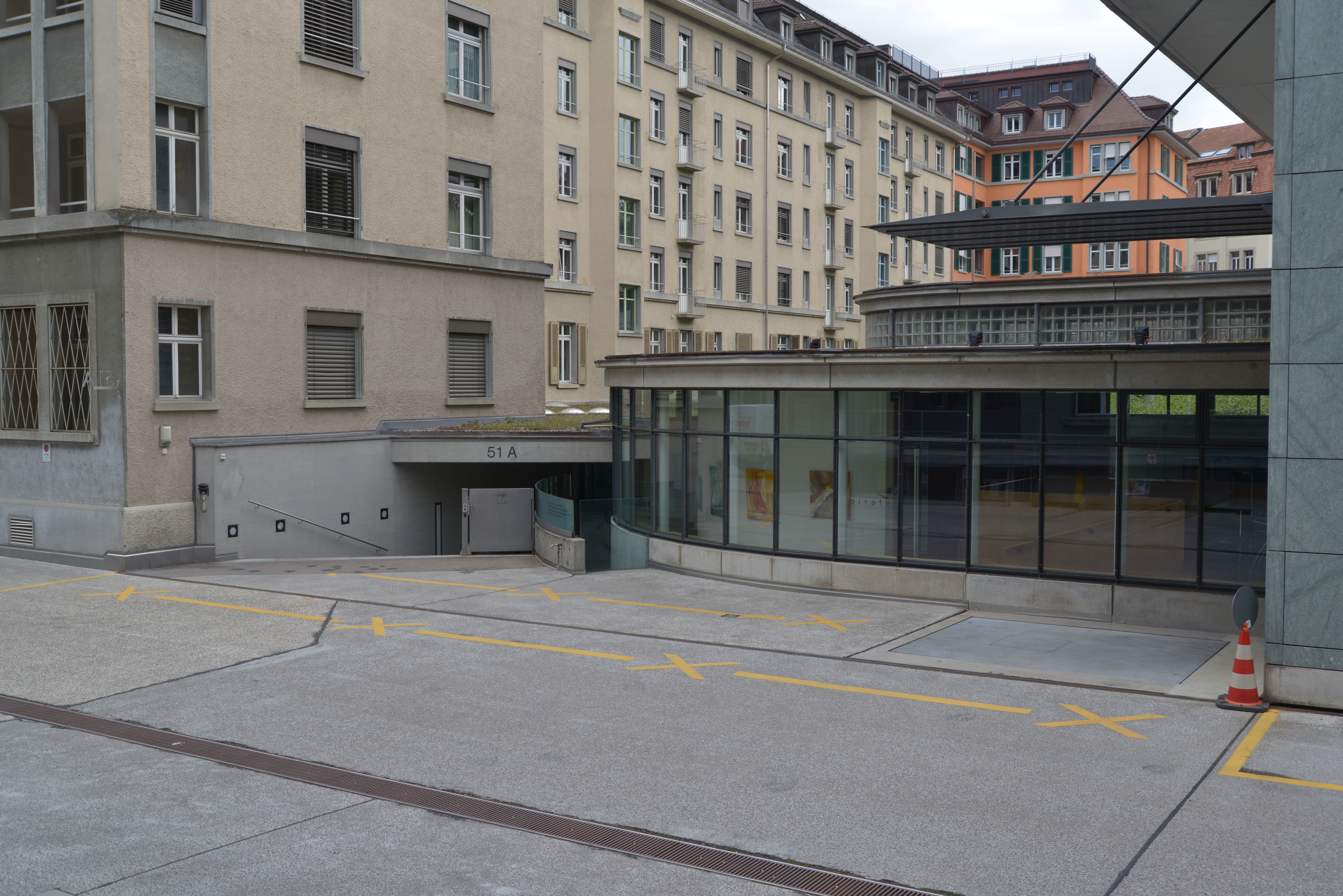
Former IRFBA head office in Bern

The Investigation Bureau for Railway, Funicular and Boat Accidents (IRFBA; German: Unfalluntersuchungsstelle für Bahnen und Schiffe, UUS; French: Service d'enquête sur les accidents des transports publics, SEA; Italian: Servizio d’inchiesta sugli infortuni dei trasporti pubblici, SII) was an agency of the government of Switzerland. In 2011, it was replaced by the Swiss Transportation Safety Investigation Board.

== Description ==
Its head office was in Bern, and it had an eastern Switzerland office in Schlieren. It investigated accidents and incidents concerning railway systems, funicular systems, and boats.

The agency was disestablished on 1 November 2011 when it and the Aircraft Accident Investigation Bureau merged to form the Swiss Accident Investigation Board.

== See also ==
- Fiesch derailment
