= Betten =

- Former municipality
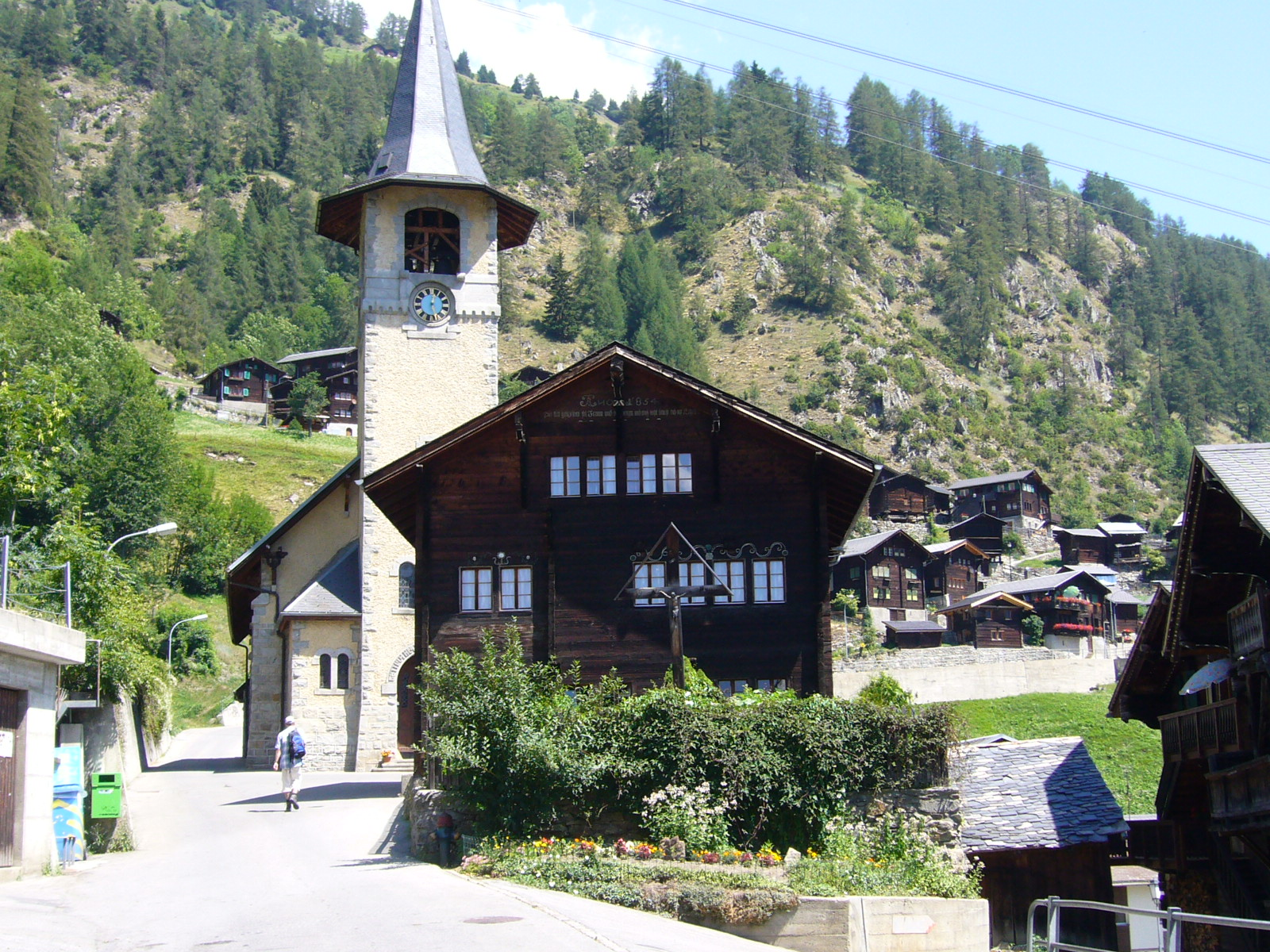

- Flag Coat of arms
- Location of Betten
- Location within Switzerland Location within Canton of Valais
- Coordinates: 46°22′N 8°4′E
- Country: Switzerland
- Canton: Valais
- District: Raron

Area
  - Total: 26.4 km^{2} (10.2 sq mi)
- Elevation: 1,203 m (3,947 ft)

Population (Dec 2011)
  - Total: 420
  - Density: 16/km^{2} (41/sq mi)
- Time zone: UTC+01:00 (CET)
  - Summer (DST): UTC+02:00 (CEST)
- Postal code: 3991
- SFOS number: 6171
- ISO 3166 code: CH-VS
- Surrounded by: Fiesch, Fieschertal, Filet, Grengiols, Lax, Martisberg, Naters, Riederalp
- Website: gemeinde.bettmeralp.ch

Betten is a former municipality in the district of Raron in the canton of Valais in Switzerland. On 1 January 2014 the former municipalities of Betten and Martisberg merged into the new municipality of Bettmeralp.

== History ==
Betten is first mentioned in 1243 as Bettan.

Historic aerial photograph by Werner Friedli from 1955

== Geography ==
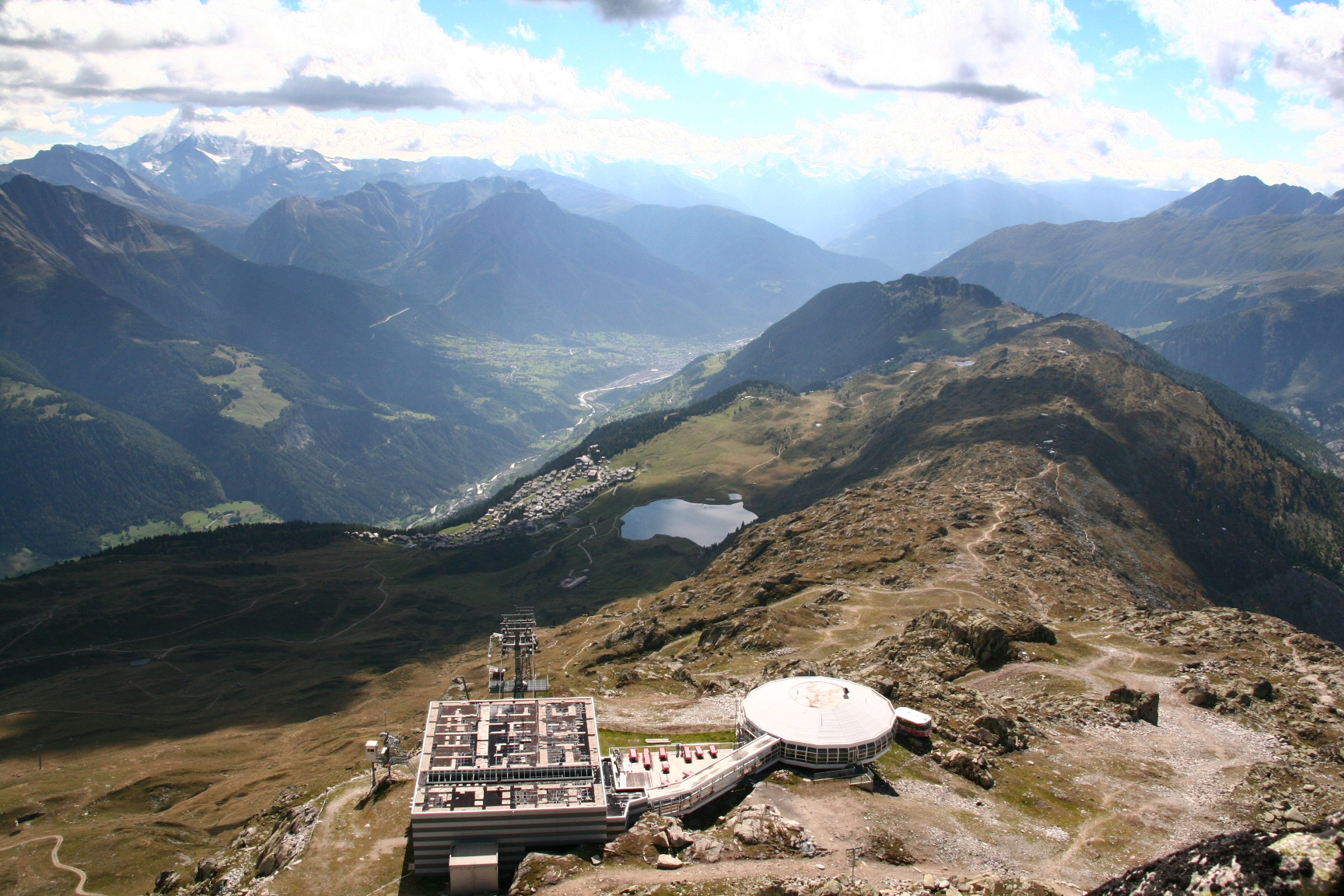
View from Bettmerhorn toward Bettmeralp and Bettmersee

Before the merger, Betten had a total area of 26.4 km^{2} (10.2 mi^{2}). Of this area, 15.9% is used for agricultural purposes, while 12.0% is forested. Of the rest of the land, 1.3% is settled (buildings or roads) and 70.8% is unproductive land.

The former municipality is located in the Östlich-Raron district, on a south facing terrace at an elevation of 1,200 m (3,900 ft). It consists of the main village of Betten, the village of Egga and the Bettmeralp alpine settlement at an elevation of 1,900 m (6,200 ft).

== Coat of arms ==
The blazon of the municipal coat of arms is Tierced per mantle, Or a Fish sautant Azure above a base wavy Azure, in dexter Gules issuant from a base invected a Tree Vert trunked Proper, in sinister Azure issuant from a base invected a Chapel Argent roofed, doored and windowed Sable.

== Demographics ==
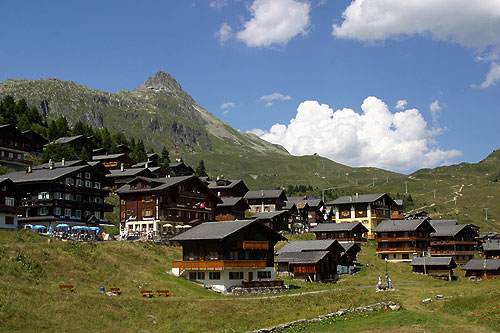
Bettmeralp village

Betten had a population (as of 2011) of 420. As of 2008, 7.6% of the population are resident foreign nationals. Over the last 10 years (2000–2010 ) the population has changed at a rate of -11.6%. It has changed at a rate of -16.6% due to migration and at a rate of -2% due to births and deaths.

Most of the population (as of 2000) speaks German (433 or 96.4%) as their first language, Serbo-Croatian is the second most common (5 or 1.1%) and French is the third (4 or 0.9%). There is 1 person who speaks Italian.

As of 2008, the population was made up of 367 Swiss citizens and 30 non-citizen residents (7.56% of the population). Of the population in the municipality, 272 or about 60.6% were born in Betten and lived there in 2000. There were 79 or 17.6% who were born in the same canton, while 53 or 11.8% were born somewhere else in Switzerland, and 25 or 5.6% were born outside of Switzerland.

As of 2000, children and teenagers (0–19 years old) make up 18% of the population, while adults (20–64 years old) make up 66.1% and seniors (over 64 years old) make up 15.8%.

As of 2000, there were 197 people who were single and never married in the municipality. There were 215 married individuals, 29 widows or widowers and 8 individuals who are divorced.

As of 2000, there were 180 private households in the municipality, and an average of 2.4 persons per household. There were 54 households that consist of only one person and 12 households with five or more people. In 2000, a total of 172 apartments (16.7% of the total) were permanently occupied, while 742 apartments (72.1%) were seasonally occupied and 115 apartments (11.2%) were empty. As of 2009, the construction rate of new housing units was 17.7 new units per 1000 residents. The vacancy rate for the municipality, in 2010, was 0.26%.

The historical population is given in the following chart:

== Sights ==
The entire hamlet of Eggen is designated as part of the Inventory of Swiss Heritage Sites.

== Politics ==
In the 2007 federal election the most popular party was the CVP which received 67.27% of the vote. The next three most popular parties were the SVP (16.11%), the SP (8.06%) and the FDP (6.14%). In the federal election, a total of 148 votes were cast, and the voter turnout was 43.1%.

In the 2009 Conseil d'État/Staatsrat election a total of 135 votes were cast, of which 23 or about 17.0% were invalid. The voter participation was 41.5%, which is much less than the cantonal average of 54.67%. In the 2007 Swiss Council of States election a total of 147 votes were cast, of which 3 or about 2.0% were invalid. The voter participation was 43.6%, which is much less than the cantonal average of 59.88%.

== Economy ==
As of 2010, Betten had an unemployment rate of 0.3%. As of 2008, there were 23 people employed in the primary economic sector and about 13 businesses involved in this sector. 22 people were employed in the secondary sector and there were 7 businesses in this sector. 312 people were employed in the tertiary sector, with 47 businesses in this sector. There were 266 residents of the municipality who were employed in some capacity, of which females made up 41.0% of the workforce.

In 2008 the total number of full-time equivalent jobs was 301. The number of jobs in the primary sector was 10, all of which were in agriculture. The number of jobs in the secondary sector was 18 of which 4 or (22.2%) were in manufacturing and 13 (72.2%) were in construction. The number of jobs in the tertiary sector was 273. In the tertiary sector; 50 or 18.3% were in wholesale or retail sales or the repair of motor vehicles, 76 or 27.8% were in the movement and storage of goods, 120 or 44.0% were in a hotel or restaurant, 4 or 1.5% were the insurance or financial industry, 2 or 0.7% were technical professionals or scientists, 2 or 0.7% were in education and 3 or 1.1% were in health care.

In 2000, there were 81 workers who commuted into the municipality and 39 workers who commuted away. The municipality is a net importer of workers, with about 2.1 workers entering the municipality for every one leaving. About 4.9% of the workforce coming into Betten are coming from outside Switzerland. Of the working population, 20.7% used public transportation to get to work, and 9.4% used a private car.

== Religion ==
From the 2000 census, 378 or 84.2% were Roman Catholic, while 24 or 5.3% belonged to the Swiss Reformed Church. Of the rest of the population, there were 15 members of an Orthodox church (or about 3.34% of the population), and there were 12 individuals (or about 2.67% of the population) who belonged to another Christian church. There were 3 (or about 0.67% of the population) who were Islamic. 8 (or about 1.78% of the population) belonged to no church, are agnostic or atheist, and 15 individuals (or about 3.34% of the population) did not answer the question.

== Education ==
In Betten about 181 or (40.3%) of the population have completed non-mandatory upper secondary education, and 22 or (4.9%) have completed additional higher education (either university or a Fachhochschule). Of the 22 who completed tertiary schooling, 77.3% were Swiss men, 18.2% were Swiss women.

During the 2010–2011 school year there were a total of 17 students in the Betten school system. The education system in the Canton of Valais allows young children to attend one year of non-obligatory Kindergarten. During that school year, there was one kindergarten class (KG1 or KG2) and 3 kindergarten students. The canton's school system requires students to attend six years of primary school. In Betten there were a total of 2 classes and 17 students in the primary school. The secondary school program consists of three lower, obligatory years of schooling (orientation classes), followed by three to five years of optional, advanced schools. All the lower and upper secondary students from Betten attend their school in a neighboring municipality.

As of 2000, there were 21 students from Betten who attended schools outside the municipality.
