= Lax, Switzerland =

Lax
- Municipality
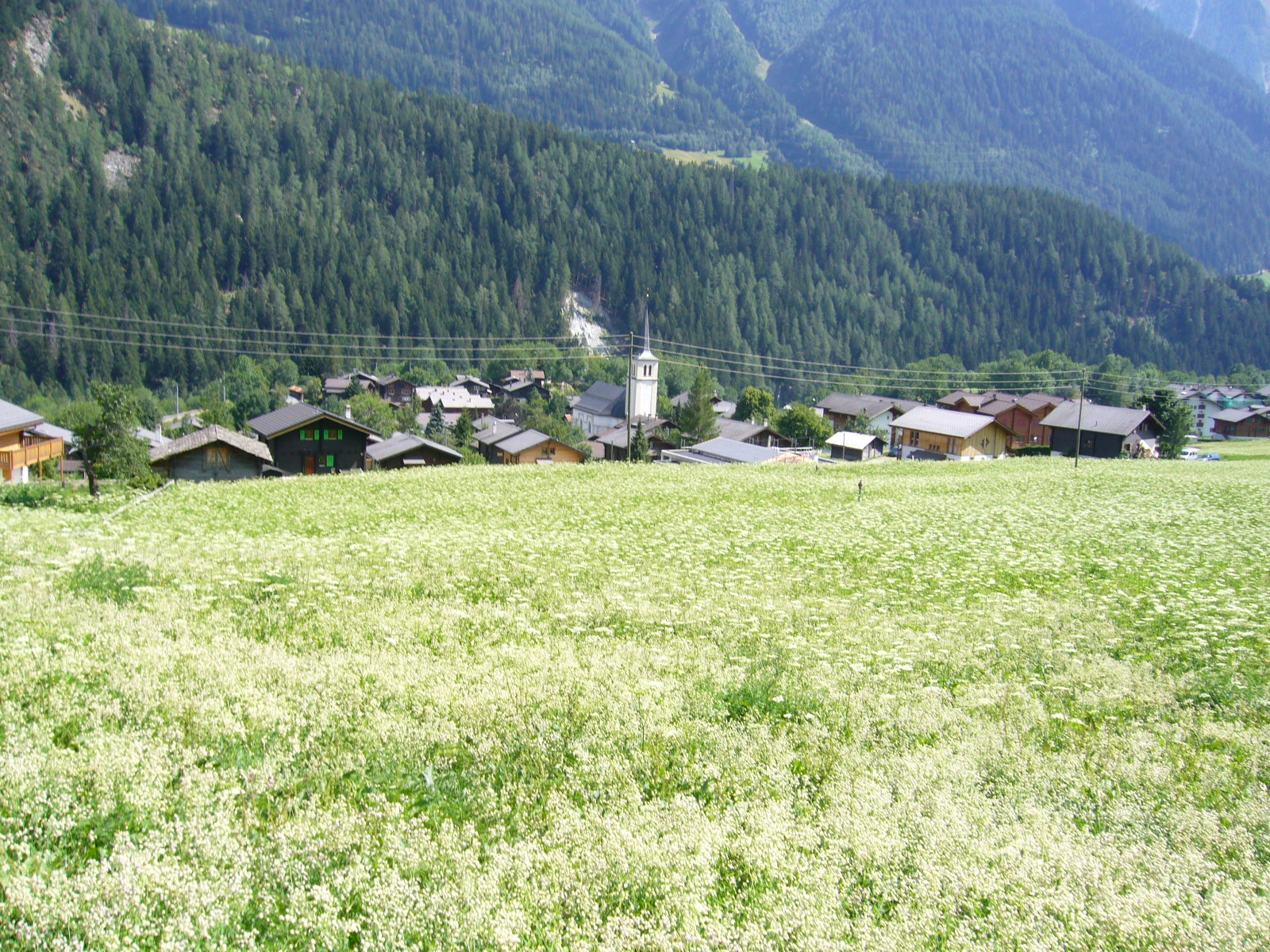

- Flag Coat of arms
- Location of Lax
- Location within Switzerland Location within Canton of Valais
- Coordinates: 46°23′N 8°7′E
- Country: Switzerland
- Canton: Valais
- District: Goms

Government
  - Mayor: Paul Imhof

Area
  - Total: 5.0 km^{2} (1.9 sq mi)
- Elevation: 1,039 m (3,409 ft)

Population (December 2002)
  - Total: 312
  - Density: 62/km^{2} (160/sq mi)
- Time zone: UTC+01:00 (CET)
  - Summer (DST): UTC+02:00 (CEST)
- Postal code: 3994
- SFOS number: 6061
- ISO 3166 code: CH-VS
- Surrounded by: Betten, Ernen, Fiesch, Grengiols, Martisberg
- Website: www.lax.ch

Lax is a municipality in the district of Goms in the canton of Valais in Switzerland.

== History ==
Lax is first mentioned in 1295 as Lacx. Lax is next documented as a community named Zend Goms Lax in 1308. The first division of irrigation was in 1347; the current system feeds seven farms around the small town. The first local regulations date from 1436.

== Geography ==
Lax has an area, as of 2011, of 5 square kilometers (1.9 mi^{2}). Of this area, 37.1% is used for agricultural purposes, while 38.9% is forested. Of the rest of the land, 6.4% is settled (buildings or roads) and 17.6% is unproductive land.

The municipality is located above the Deisch valley on a small plateau on the right bank of the Rhone.

== Coat of arms ==
The blazon of the municipal coat of arms is Azure, a mountain fesswise Argent, in chief three pine trees eradicated Vert trunked proper.

== Demographics ==
Historical population
Year	Pop.	±%
1850	167	—
1860	189	+13.2%
1870	169	−10.6%
1880	200	+18.3%
1888	194	−3.0%
1900	191	−1.5%
1910	225	+17.8%
1920	215	−4.4%
1930	198	−7.9%
1941	212	+7.1%
1950	222	+4.7%
1960	215	−3.2%
1970	212	−1.4%
1980	301	+42.0%
1990	307	+2.0%
2000	290	−5.5%

Lax has a population (as of December 2020) of 329. As of 2008, 13.7% of the population are resident foreign nationals. Over the last 10 years (1999–2009) the population has changed at a rate of -4.7%. It has changed at a rate of -9.7% due to migration and at a rate of 3.7% due to births and deaths.

Most of the population (as of 2000) speaks German (273 or 94.1%) as their first language, Serbo-Croatian is the second most common (12 or 4.1%) and Dutch is the third (2 or 0.7%), 1 person who speaks Italian.

As of 2008, the gender distribution of the population was 53.9% male and 46.1% female. The population was made up of 137 Swiss men (44.8% of the population) and 28 (9.2%) non-Swiss men. There were 124 Swiss women (40.5%) and 17 (5.6%) non-Swiss women. Of the population in the municipality 140 or about 48.3% were born in Lax and lived there in 2000. There were 89 or 30.7% who were born in the same canton, while 20 or 6.9% were born somewhere else in Switzerland, and 34 or 11.7% were born outside of Switzerland.

The age distribution of the population (as of 2000) is children and teenagers (0–19 years old) make up 23.1% of the population, while adults (20–64 years old) make up 65.2% and seniors (over 64 years old) make up 11.7%.

As of 2000, there were 124 people who were single and never married in the municipality. There were 144 married individuals, 15 widows or widowers and 7 individuals who are divorced.

As of 2000, there were 112 private households in the municipality, and an average of 2.6 persons per household. There were 31 households that consist of only one person and 10 households with five or more people. Out of a total of 113 households that answered this question, 27.4% were households made up of just one person. Of the rest of the households, there are 29 married couples without children, 41 married couples with children There were 8 single parents with a child or children. There were 3 households that were made up of unrelated people and 1 household that was made up of some sort of institution or another collective housing.

In 2000 there were 64 single family homes (or 38.8% of the total) out of a total of 165 inhabited buildings. There were 81 multi-family buildings (49.1%), along with 13 multi-purpose buildings that were mostly used for housing (7.9%) and 7 other use buildings (commercial or industrial) that also had some housing (4.2%).

In 2000, a total of 111 apartments (29.1% of the total) were permanently occupied, while 128 apartments (33.6%) were seasonally occupied and 142 apartments (37.3%) were empty. As of 2009, the construction rate of new housing units was 3.3 new units per 1000 residents. The vacancy rate for the municipality, in 2010, was 2.31%.

== Politics ==
In the 2007 federal election the most popular party was the CVP which received 63.01% of the vote. The next three most popular parties were the SVP (16.57%), the SP (13.19%) and the Green Party (3.5%). In the federal election, a total of 129 votes were cast, and the voter turnout was 56.3%.

In the 2009 Conseil d'État/Staatsrat election a total of 109 votes were cast, of which 7 or about 6.4% were invalid. The voter participation was 50.9%, which is similar to the cantonal average of 54.67%. In the 2007 Swiss Council of States election a total of 124 votes were cast, of which 7 or about 5.6% were invalid. The voter participation was 55.6%, which is similar to the cantonal average of 59.88%.

== Economy ==
As of 2010, Lax had an unemployment rate of 3%. As of 2008, there were 15 people employed in the primary economic sector and about 8 businesses involved in this sector. 27 people were employed in the secondary sector and there were 3 businesses in this sector. 52 people were employed in the tertiary sector, with 16 businesses in this sector. There were 163 residents of the municipality who were employed in some capacity, of which females made up 36.8% of the workforce.

In 2008 the total number of full-time equivalent jobs was 82. The number of jobs in the primary sector was 9, all of which were in agriculture. The number of jobs in the secondary sector was 26 of which 5 or (19.2%) were in manufacturing and 21 (80.8%) were in construction. The number of jobs in the tertiary sector was 47. In the tertiary sector; 10 or 21.3% were in wholesale or retail sales or the repair of motor vehicles, 9 or 19.1% were in a hotel or restaurant, 5 or 10.6% were in the information industry, 7 or 14.9% were the insurance or financial industry, 11 or 23.4% were technical professionals or scientists, 1 was in education.

In 2000, there were 46 workers who commuted into the municipality and 94 workers who commuted away. The municipality is a net exporter of workers, with about 2.0 workers leaving the municipality for every one entering. Of the working population, 13.5% used public transportation to get to work, and 57.7% used a private car.

== Religion ==
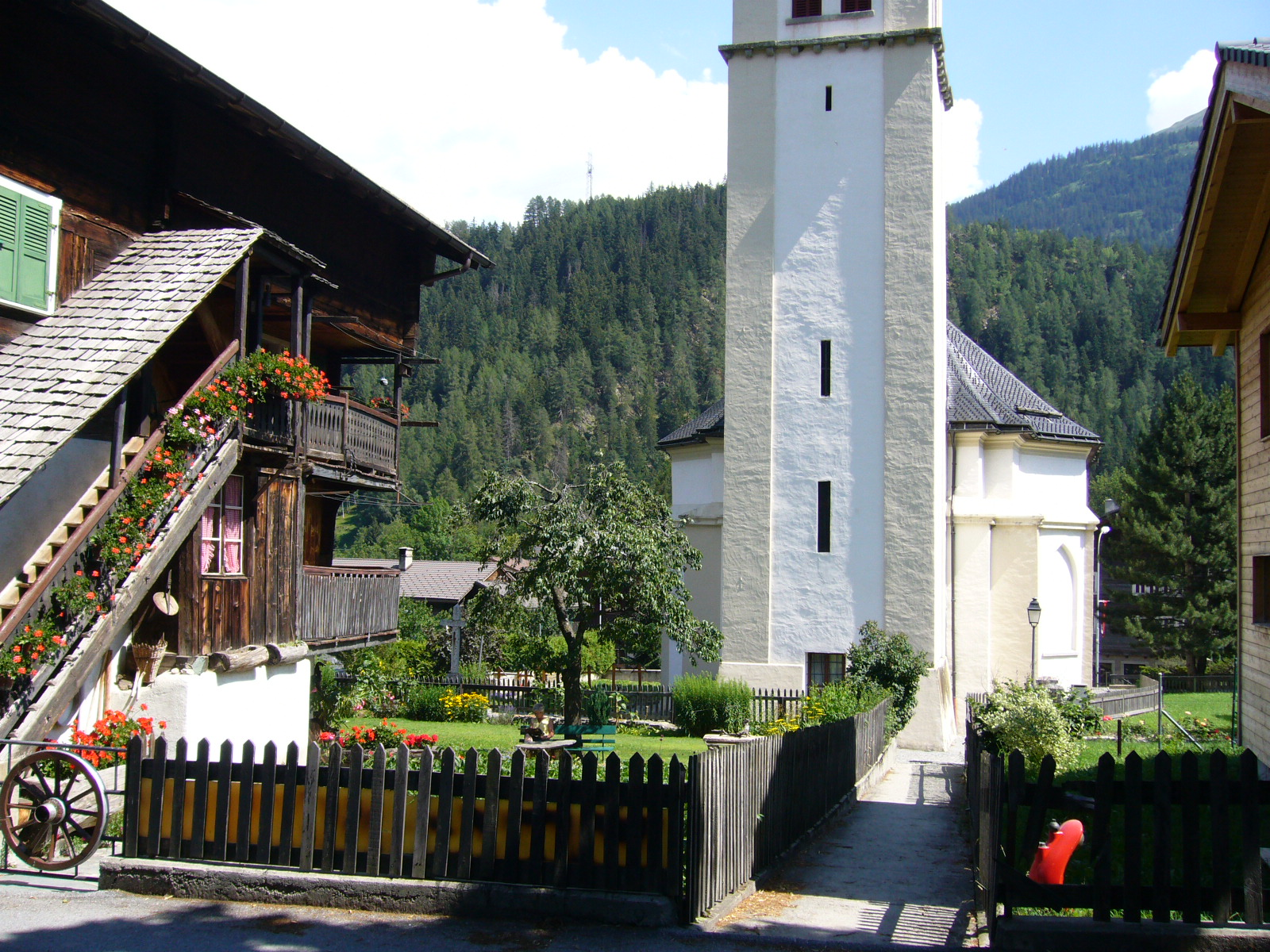
Church of Lax

The principal landmark is the neo-Gothic church of Saint Anne, designed by Antonio Croci, which dates from 1868.

From the 2000 census, 248 or 85.5% were Roman Catholic, while 11 or 3.8% belonged to the Swiss Reformed Church. Of the rest of the population, there were 14 members of an Orthodox church (or about 4.83% of the population), and there was 1 individual who belongs to another Christian church. There were 7 (or about 2.41% of the population) who were Islamic. 2 (or about 0.69% of the population) belonged to no church, are agnostic or atheist, and 7 individuals (or about 2.41% of the population) did not answer the question.

== Education ==
In Lax about 120 or (41.4%) of the population have completed non-mandatory upper secondary education, and 24 or (8.3%) have completed additional higher education (either university or a Fachhochschule). Of the 24 who completed tertiary schooling, 95.8% were Swiss men, 4.2% were Swiss women.

As of 2000, there were 8 students in Lax who came from another municipality, while 25 residents attended schools outside the municipality.
