= Fiesch =

- Municipality
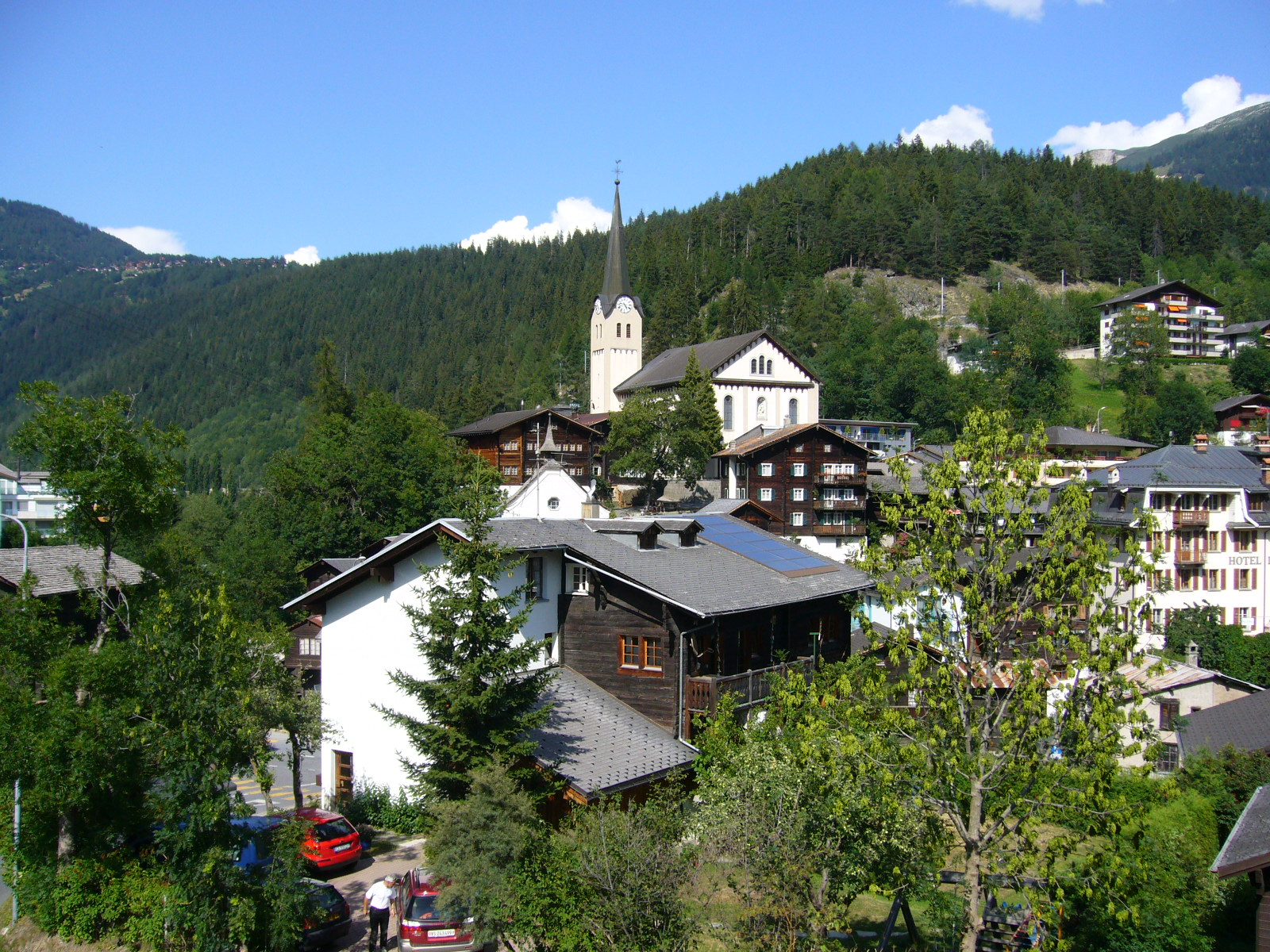

- Flag Coat of arms
- Location of Fiesch
- Location within Switzerland Location within Canton of Valais
- Coordinates: 46°24′N 8°8′E
- Country: Switzerland
- Canton: Valais
- District: Goms

Government
  - Mayor: Russi Klaus

Area
  - Total: 11.3 km^{2} (4.4 sq mi)
- Elevation: 1,049 m (3,442 ft)

Population (December 2002)
  - Total: 1,002
  - Density: 88.7/km^{2} (230/sq mi)
- Time zone: UTC+01:00 (CET)
  - Summer (DST): UTC+02:00 (CEST)
- Postal code: 3984
- SFOS number: 6057
- ISO 3166 code: CH-VS
- Surrounded by: Bellwald, Betten, Ernen, Fieschertal, Lax
- Website: www.gemeinde-fiesch.ch

Fiesch is a municipality in the district of Goms in the canton of Valais in Switzerland. Nearby Fiescheralp is administered by Fiesch and is accessible by the Eggishorn lift.

It has been designated a UNESCO World Heritage site for its view of the Jungfrau-Aletsch Protected Area.

== History ==
Fiesch is first mentioned in 1203 as "Vios". In 1438 it is recorded as "Viesch", and has been known as Fiesch since 1905.

Historic aerial photograph by Werner Friedli from 1955

The Fiesch derailment occurred in 2010.

== Geography ==
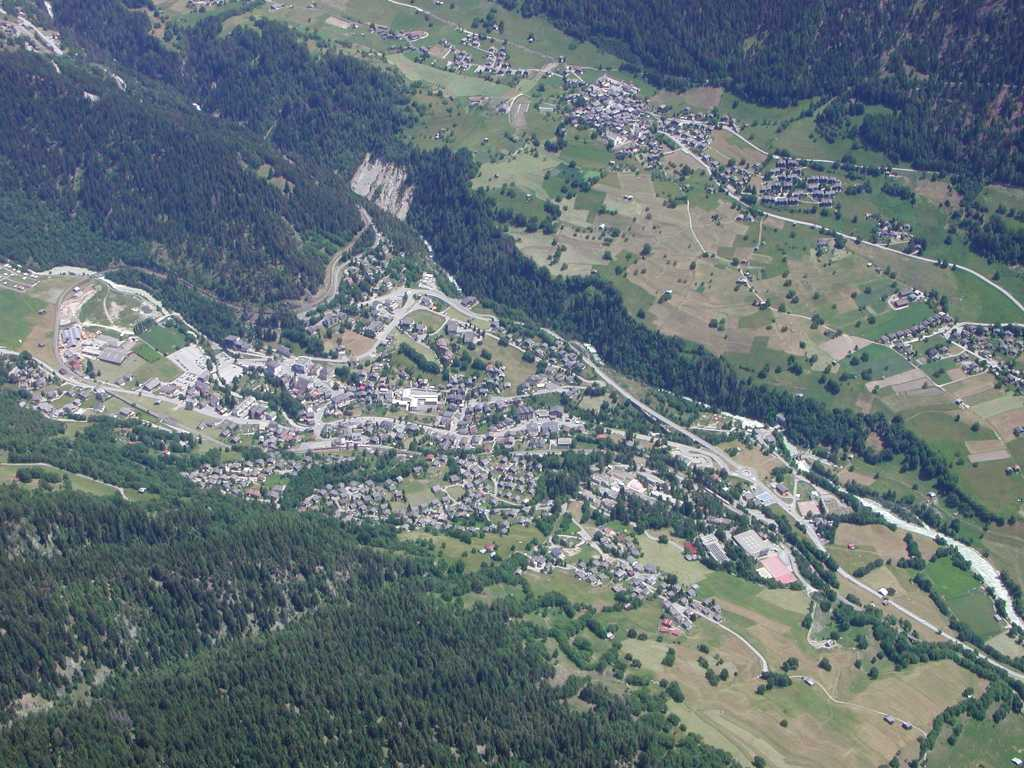
Fiesch viewed from the lift

Fiesch has an area, as of 2011, of 11.3 square kilometers (4.4 mi^{2}). Of this area, 32.6% is used for agricultural purposes, while 40.6% is forested. Of the rest of the land, 6.4% is settled (buildings or roads) and 20.4% is unproductive land.

The municipality is located in a small valley and on the slopes above both sides of the Weisswasser.

== Coat of arms ==
The blazon of the municipal coat of arms is Azure, a fess wavy Argent in base Coupeaux of the same.

== Demographics ==
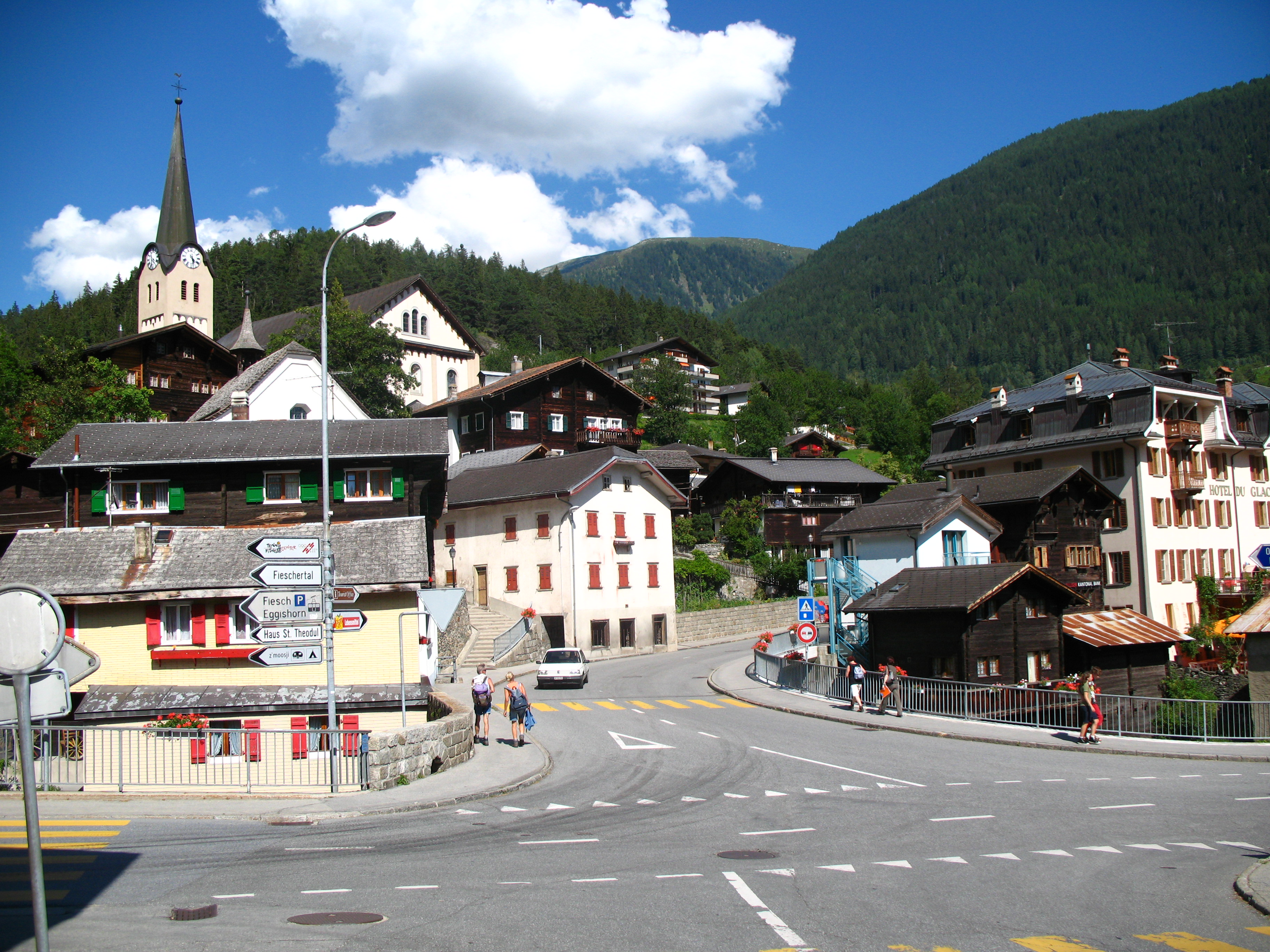
View towards the church from the main road by the river

Fiesch has a population (as of December 2020) of 909. As of 2008, 17.9% of the population are resident foreign nationals. Over the last 10 years (1999–2009 ) the population has changed at a rate of -4.5%. It has changed at a rate of -2% due to migration and at a rate of -2% due to births and deaths.

Most of the population (as of 2000) speaks German (872 or 87.6%) as their first language, Serbo-Croatian is the second most common (87 or 8.7%) and Albanian is the third (13 or 1.3%). There are 7 people who speak French, 1 person who speaks Italian.

As of 2008, the gender distribution of the population was 50.9% male and 49.1% female. The population was made up of 403 Swiss men (41.5% of the population) and 92 (9.5%) non-Swiss men. There were 382 Swiss women (39.3%) and 95 (9.8%) non-Swiss women. Of the population in the municipality 433 or about 43.5% were born in Fiesch and lived there in 2000. There were 272 or 27.3% who were born in the same canton, while 103 or 10.3% were born somewhere else in Switzerland, and 172 or 17.3% were born outside of Switzerland.

The age distribution of the population (as of 2000) is children and teenagers (0–19 years old) make up 24.1% of the population, while adults (20–64 years old) make up 60% and seniors (over 64 years old) make up 15.9%.

As of 2000, there were 401 people who were single and never married in the municipality. There were 514 married individuals, 57 widows or widowers and 24 individuals who are divorced.

As of 2000, there were 372 private households in the municipality, and an average of 2.5 persons per household. There were 97 households that consist of only one person and 35 households with five or more people. Out of a total of 379 households that answered this question, 25.6% were households made up of just one person and there were 2 adults who lived with their parents. Of the rest of the households, there are 110 married couples without children, 145 married couples with children There were 11 single parents with a child or children. There were 7 households that were made up of unrelated people and 7 households that were made up of some sort of institution or another collective housing.

In 2000 there were 266 single family homes (or 54.8% of the total) out of a total of 485 inhabited buildings. There were 151 multi-family buildings (31.1%), along with 29 multi-purpose buildings that were mostly used for housing (6.0%) and 39 other use buildings (commercial or industrial) that also had some housing (8.0%).

In 2000, a total of 351 apartments (41.8% of the total) were permanently occupied, while 427 apartments (50.8%) were seasonally occupied and 62 apartments (7.4%) were empty. As of 2009, the construction rate of new housing units was 4.1 new units per 1000 residents. The vacancy rate for the municipality, in 2010, was 1.02%.

The historical population is given in the following chart:

== Twin Town ==
Fiesch is twinned with the town of Neufra, Germany.

== Politics ==
In the 2007 federal election the most popular party was the CVP which received 60.07% of the vote. The next three most popular parties were the SVP (16.05%), the SP (14.91%) and the FDP (7.37%). In the federal election, a total of 356 votes were cast, and the voter turnout was 50.6%.

In the 2009 Conseil d'État/Staatsrat election a total of 352 votes were cast, of which 18 or about 5.1% were invalid. The voter participation was 51.4%, which is similar to the cantonal average of 54.67%. In the 2007 Swiss Council of States election a total of 356 votes were cast, of which 7 or about 2.0% were invalid. The voter participation was 51.4%, which is much less than the cantonal average of 59.88%.

== Economy ==
The main source of income of the village is tourism, especially hiking, mountain biking, paragliding, snowboarding and skiing, along with many other sports for which the village is an ideal starting point. Above Fiesch, in the Fiescheralp (previously referred to as Kühboden), there is a ski resort and a launch point for hang glider and paraglider pilots.

As of 2010, Fiesch had an unemployment rate of 2.4%. As of 2008, there were 10 people employed in the primary economic sector and about 7 businesses involved in this sector. 57 people were employed in the secondary sector and there were 14 businesses in this sector. 551 people were employed in the tertiary sector, with 78 businesses in this sector. There were 532 residents of the municipality who were employed in some capacity, of which females made up 41.9% of the workforce.

In 2008 the total number of full-time equivalent jobs was 511. The number of jobs in the primary sector was 5, all of which were in agriculture. The number of jobs in the secondary sector was 54 of which 23 or (42.6%) were in manufacturing and 31 (57.4%) were in construction. The number of jobs in the tertiary sector was 452. In the tertiary sector; 84 or 18.6% were in wholesale or retail sales or the repair of motor vehicles, 55 or 12.2% were in the movement and storage of goods, 119 or 26.3% were in a hotel or restaurant, 1 was in the information industry, 18 or 4.0% were the insurance or financial industry, 9 or 2.0% were technical professionals or scientists, 4 or 0.9% were in education and 80 or 17.7% were in health care.

In 2000, there were 285 workers who commuted into the municipality and 183 workers who commuted away. The municipality is a net importer of workers, with about 1.6 workers entering the municipality for every one leaving. Of the working population, 10.2% used public transportation to get to work, and 39.1% used a private car.

== Religion ==
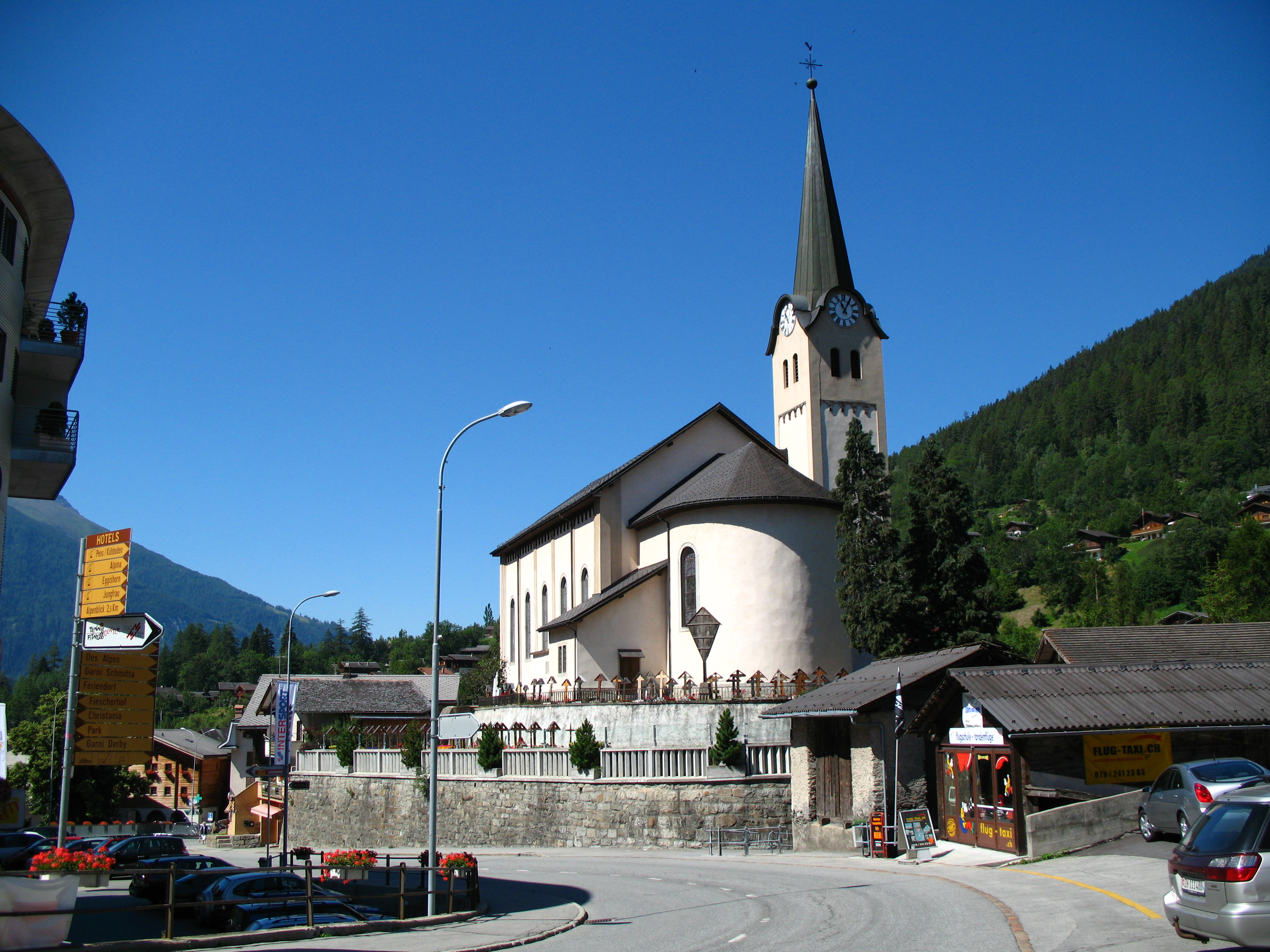
Village church

From the 2000 census, 804 or 80.7% were Roman Catholic, while 60 or 6.0% belonged to the Swiss Reformed Church. Of the rest of the population, there were 80 members of an Orthodox church (or about 8.03% of the population), and there was 1 individual who belongs to another Christian church. There were 14 (or about 1.41% of the population) who were Islamic. 24 (or about 2.41% of the population) belonged to no church, are agnostic or atheist, and 13 individuals (or about 1.31% of the population) did not answer the question.

== Education ==
In Fiesch about 370 or (37.1%) of the population have completed non-mandatory upper secondary education, and 90 or (9.0%) have completed additional higher education (either university or a Fachhochschule). Of the 90 who completed tertiary schooling, 67.8% were Swiss men, 15.6% were Swiss women, 8.9% were non-Swiss men and 7.8% were non-Swiss women.

During the 2010-2011 school year there were a total of 179 students in the Fiesch school system. The education system in the Canton of Valais allows young children to attend one year of non-obligatory Kindergarten. During that school year, there 2 kindergarten classes (KG1 or KG2) and 31 kindergarten students. The canton's school system requires students to attend six years of primary school. In Fiesch there were a total of 6 classes and 98 students in the primary school. The secondary school program consists of three lower, obligatory years of schooling (orientation classes), followed by three to five years of optional, advanced schools. There were 81 lower secondary students who attended school in Fiesch. All the upper secondary students attended school in another municipality.

As of 2000, there were 122 students in Fiesch who came from another municipality, while 31 residents attended schools outside the municipality.

Fiesch is home to the Regionalbibliothek Goms in Fiesch library. The library has (as of 2008) 3,843 books or other media, and loaned out 3,885 items in the same year. It was open a total of 150 days with average of 6 hours per week during that year.

== Transport connections ==
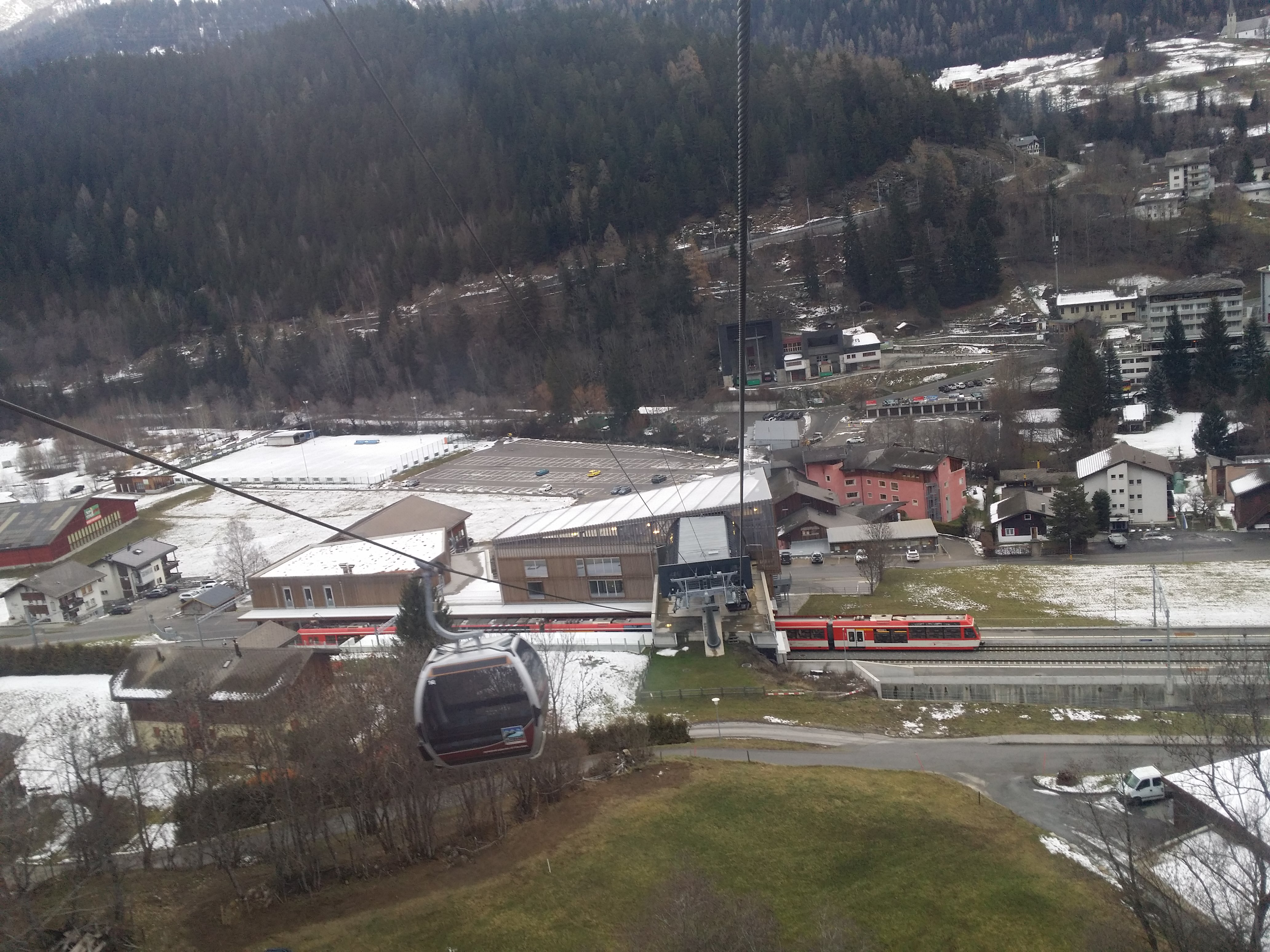
Fiesch, new 2019, combined train bus and cable station

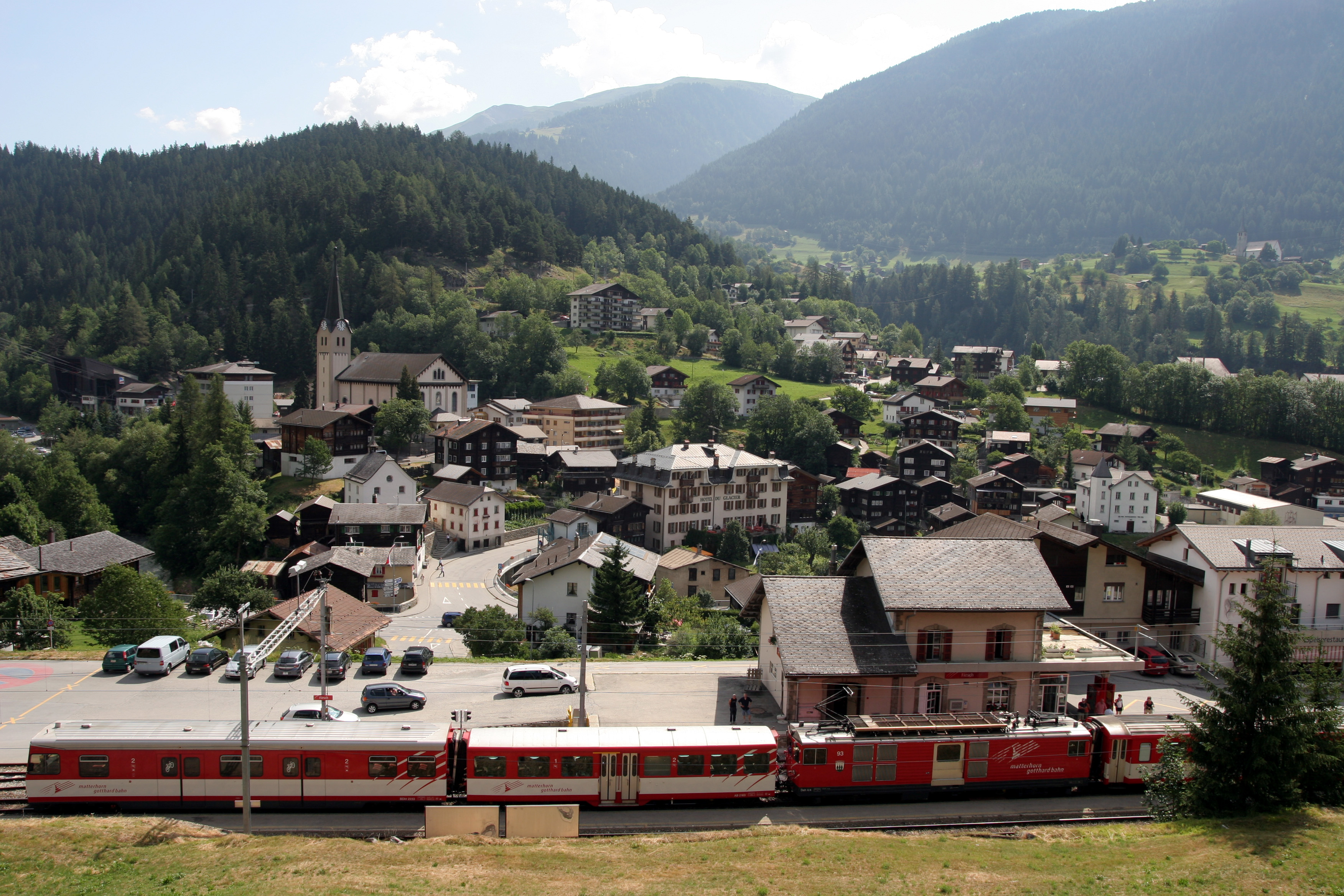
Fiesch old train station

Fiesch is served by the following transport connections:

- Furka Pass- the road through the Rhone Valley between Brig and Gletsch;
- Fiesch railway station on the Matterhorn Gotthard Bahn (formerly the Furka Oberalp Bahn);
- The valley station of the Fiesch-Eggishorn cable car;
- Postauto buses linking Fiesch with Fieschertal and Ernen.

== Lifts ==
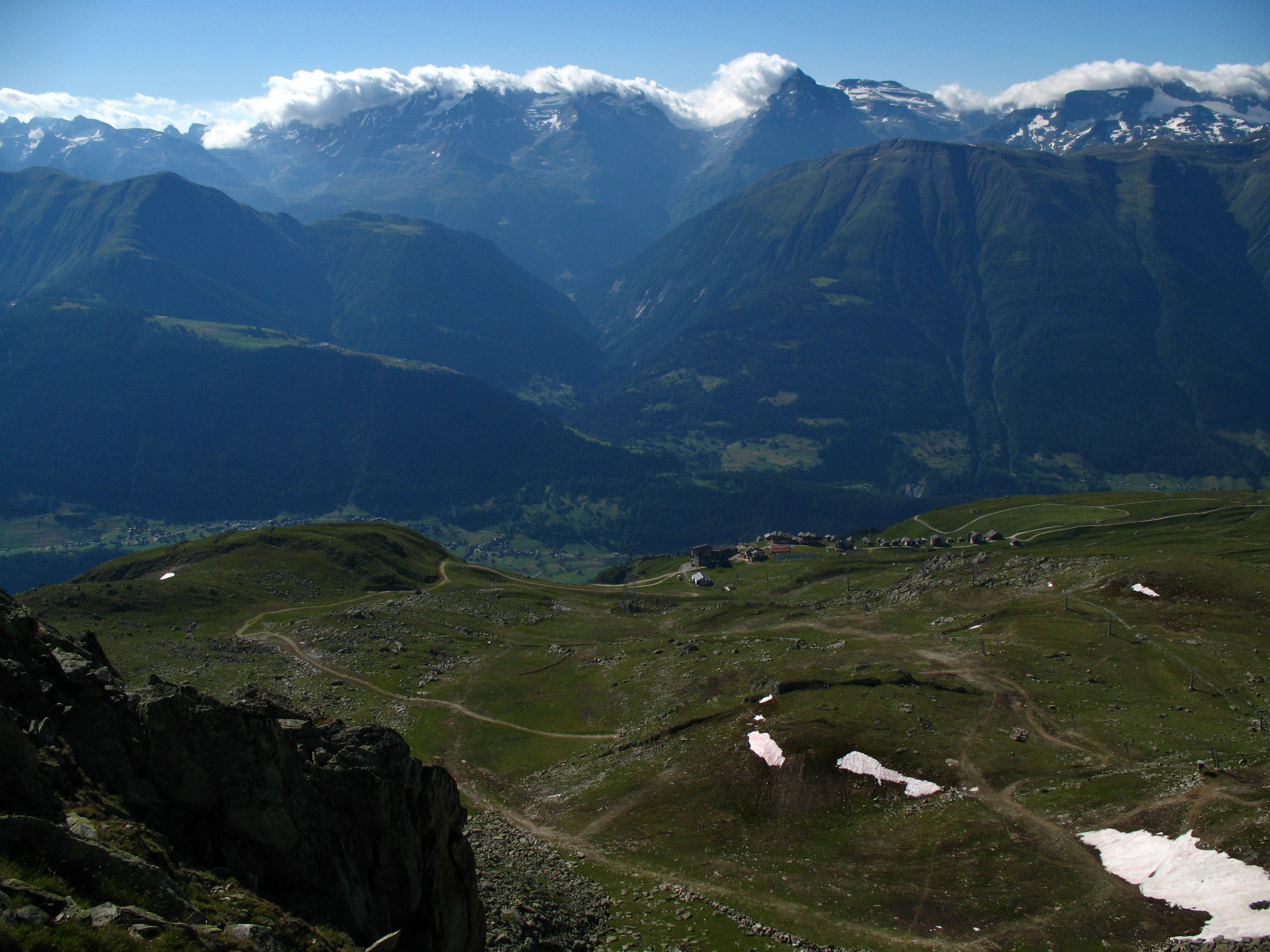
Fiescheralp

From the village, a gondola lift rises to Fiescheralp directly from the Matterhorn Gotthard Bahn railway station and Postbus terminal.

The main lifts are:

Name	type	elevation (ground station)	elevation (mountain station)	slope length	capacity (persons/hour)	construction year
Fiesch- -alp 1+2 (removed)	cable car	1074	2227	2940	800	1973
Fiesch- -alp 3+4 (removed)	cable car	1071	2221	2937	270	1966
Fiescheralp-Eggishorn	cable car	2225	2879	1836	495	1968
Heimat	chairlift	1858	2301	1144	1400	2000
Talegga	chairlift	2208	2727	1782	2200	2010
Flesch	chairlift	2208	2630	1357	2400	1993
Trainer 1	surface lift	2206	2264	218	1200	1987
Trainer 2	surface lift	2206	2264	218	1200	1987
Laxeralp 1	surface lift	2135	2179	396	1100	1981
Laxeralp 2	surface lift	2179	2280	394	1214	1981

== External links and references ==
- Municipal website (in German)
- Tourism website (in English)
- Fiesch-Eggishorn cable car website (in English)
- "Fiesch" in German, French and Italian in the online Historical Dictionary of Switzerland.
