= Berisal =

Town in Valais, Switzerland

Coordinates: 46°17′N 8°03′E

Berisal is a town in the canton of Valais, Switzerland. The town is part of the municipality of Ried-Brig and lies on the auto route E62 between the city of Brig-Glis to the northwest and the town of Rothwald to the southwest.

== Notable residents ==
- Anton Anderledy, (1819-1892), born in Berisal, Superior General of the Jesuits
