= Mund =

- Former municipality
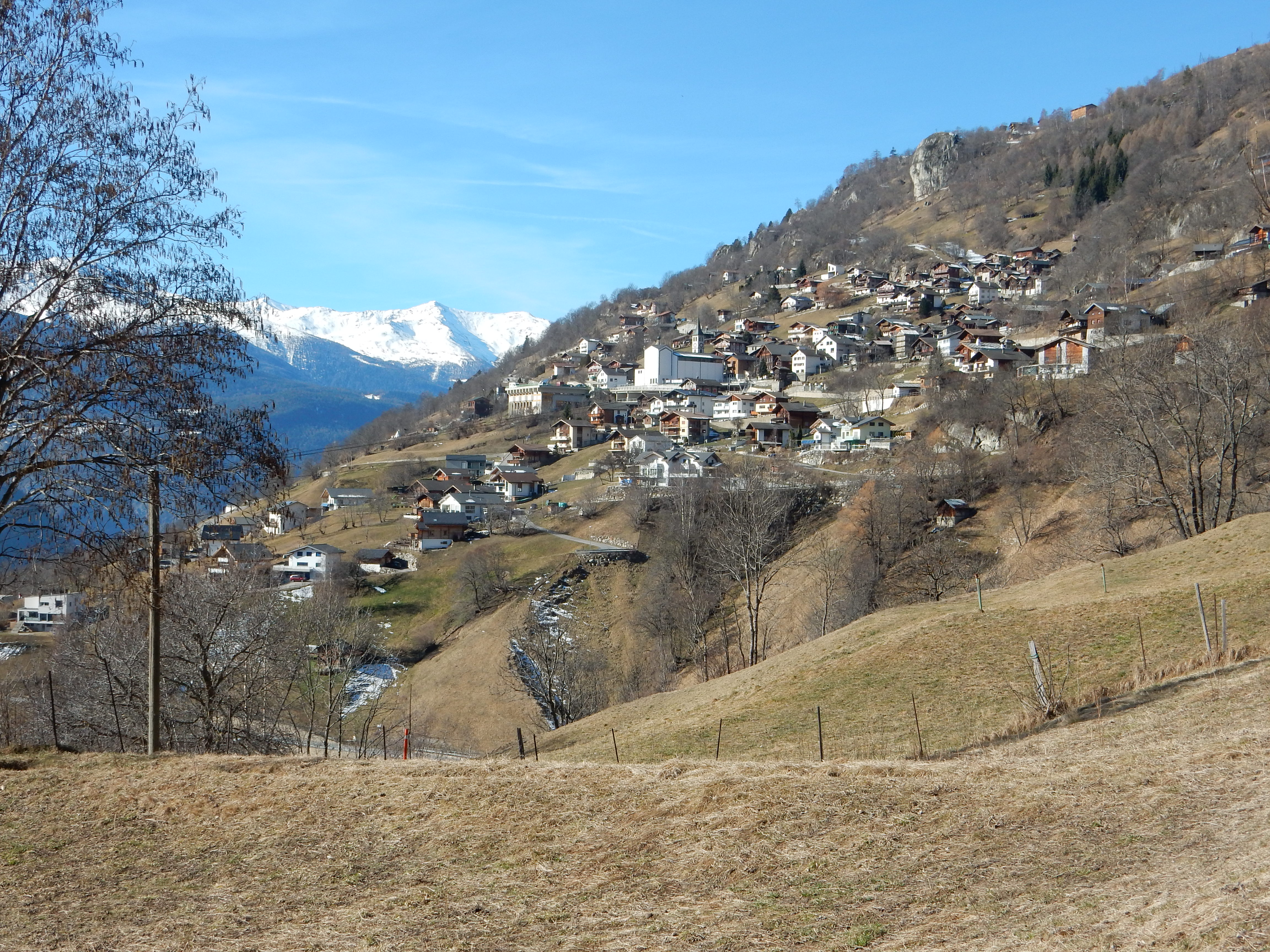

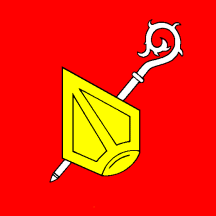
- Flag Coat of arms
- Location of Mund
- Location within Switzerland Location within Canton of Valais
- Coordinates: 46°19′N 7°57′E
- Country: Switzerland
- Canton: Valais
- District: Brig

Government
  - Mayor: Josianne Wyssen

Area
  - Total: 40.2 km^{2} (15.5 sq mi)
- Elevation: 1,188 m (3,898 ft)

Population (2010)
  - Total: 528
  - Density: 13.1/km^{2} (34.0/sq mi)
- Time zone: UTC+01:00 (CET)
  - Summer (DST): UTC+02:00 (CEST)
- Postal code: 3903
- SFOS number: 6006
- ISO 3166 code: CH-VS
- Surrounded by: Baltschieder, Brig-Glis, Eggerberg, Lalden, Naters
- Website: www.mund.ch

Mund (Swiss Standard German pronunciation: [mʊnd]) is a former municipality in the district of Brig in the canton of Valais in Switzerland. On 1 January 2013 the former municipalities of Mund and Birgisch merged into the municipality of Naters.

== History ==
Mund is first mentioned in 1259 as Munt. Until about 1800 it was normally known as Wyler and the last mention of that name was in 1850.

== Geography ==
Before the merger, Mund had a total area of 40.2 km^{2} (15.5 mi^{2}). Of this area, 24.2% is used for agricultural purposes, while 20.3% is forested. Of the rest of the land, 0.7% is settled (buildings or roads) and 54.7% is unproductive land.

The former municipality is located in the Brig district, on the northern slope of the Rhone valley at an elevation of about 1,200 m (3,900 ft).

== Coat of arms ==
The blazon of the municipal coat of arms is Gules, a Mitre Or and a Crosier Argent in saltire.

== Demographics ==
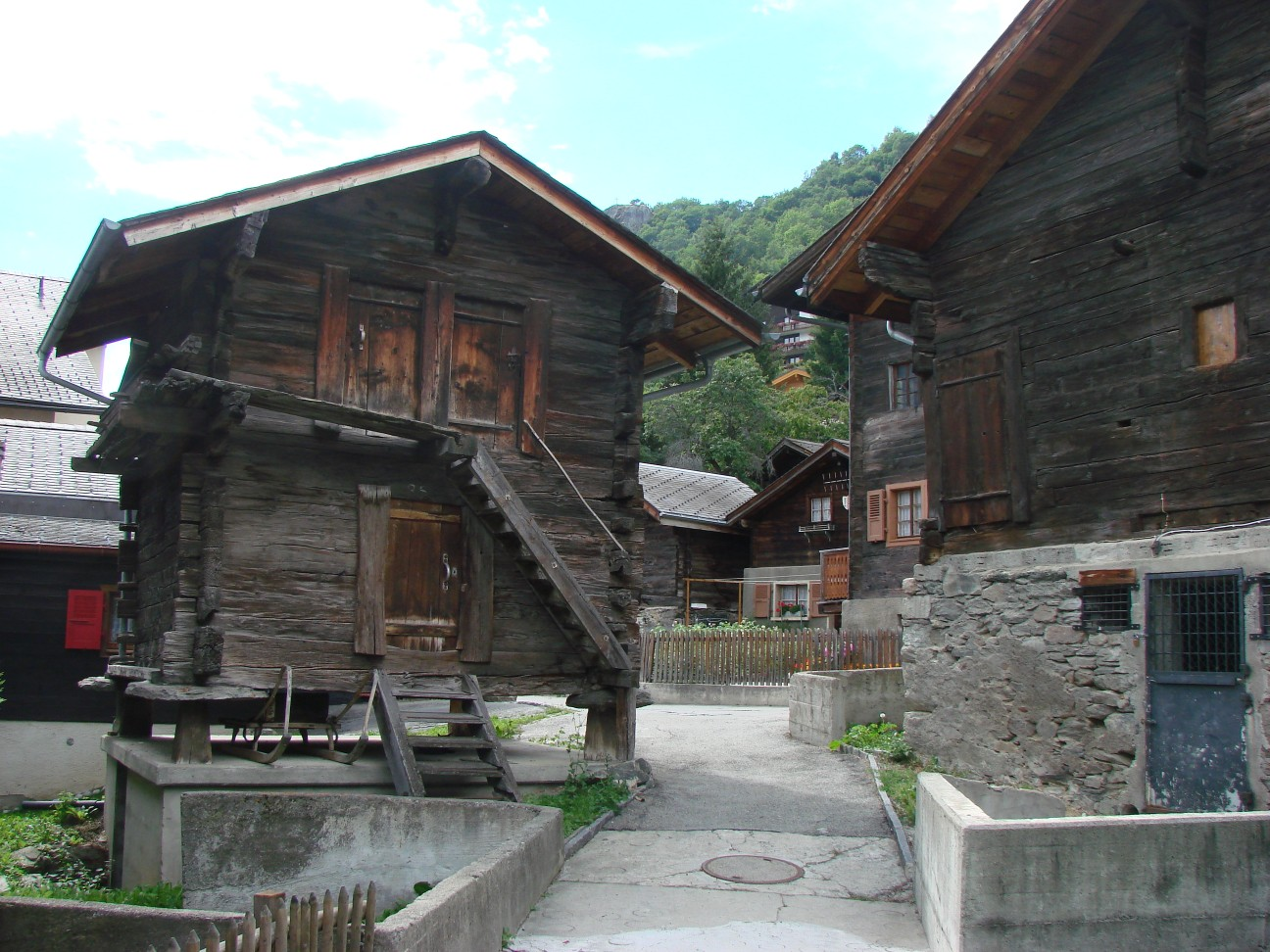
Walser granary and old houses in Mund

Mund had a population (as of 2010) of 528. As of 2008, 2.0% of the population are resident foreign nationals. Over the last 10 years (1999–2009 ) the population has changed at a rate of -12.8%. It has changed at a rate of -13% due to migration and at a rate of -1.3% due to births and deaths.

Most of the population (as of 2000) speaks German (571 or 99.5%) as their first language, while one person speaks Italian and one speaks English as their first languages.

As of 2008, the gender distribution of the population was 50.8% male and 49.2% female. The population was made up of 265 Swiss men (49.8% of the population) and 5 (0.9%) non-Swiss men. There were 258 Swiss women (48.5%) and 4 (0.8%) non-Swiss women. Of the population in the municipality 447 or about 77.9% were born in Mund and lived there in 2000. There were 98 or 17.1% who were born in the same canton, while 16 or 2.8% were born somewhere else in Switzerland, and 6 or 1.0% were born outside of Switzerland. The age distribution of the population (as of 2000) is children and teenagers (0–19 years old) make up 26% of the population, while adults (20–64 years old) make up 58.7% and seniors (over 64 years old) make up 15.3%.

As of 2000, there were 256 people who were single and never married in the municipality. There were 269 married individuals, 41 widows or widowers and 8 individuals who are divorced.

In 2000 there were 124 single family homes (or 67.8% of the total) out of a total of 183 inhabited buildings. There were 49 multi-family buildings (26.8%), along with 3 multi-purpose buildings that were mostly used for housing (1.6%) and 7 other use buildings (commercial or industrial) that also had some housing (3.8%).

In 2000, a total of 186 apartments (77.2% of the total) were permanently occupied, while 42 apartments (17.4%) were seasonally occupied and 13 apartments (5.4%) were empty. As of 2009, the construction rate of new housing units was 7.5 new units per 1000 residents. The vacancy rate for the municipality, in 2010, was 3.07%.

The historical population is given in the following chart:

== Sights ==
The entire hamlet of Bodmen is designated as part of the Inventory of Swiss Heritage Sites.

== Politics ==
In the 2007 federal election the most popular party was the CVP which received 76.82% of the vote. The next three most popular parties were the SVP (16.8%), the SP (3.92%) and the FDP (1.18%). In the federal election, a total of 280 votes were cast, and the voter turnout was 61.4%.

In the 2009 Conseil d'État/Staatsrat election a total of 284 votes were cast, of which 8 or about 2.8% were invalid. The voter participation was 67.8%, which is much more than the cantonal average of 54.67%. In the 2007 Swiss Council of States election a total of 275 votes were cast, of which 5 or about 1.8% were invalid. The voter participation was 60.3%, which is similar to the cantonal average of 59.88%.

== Economy ==
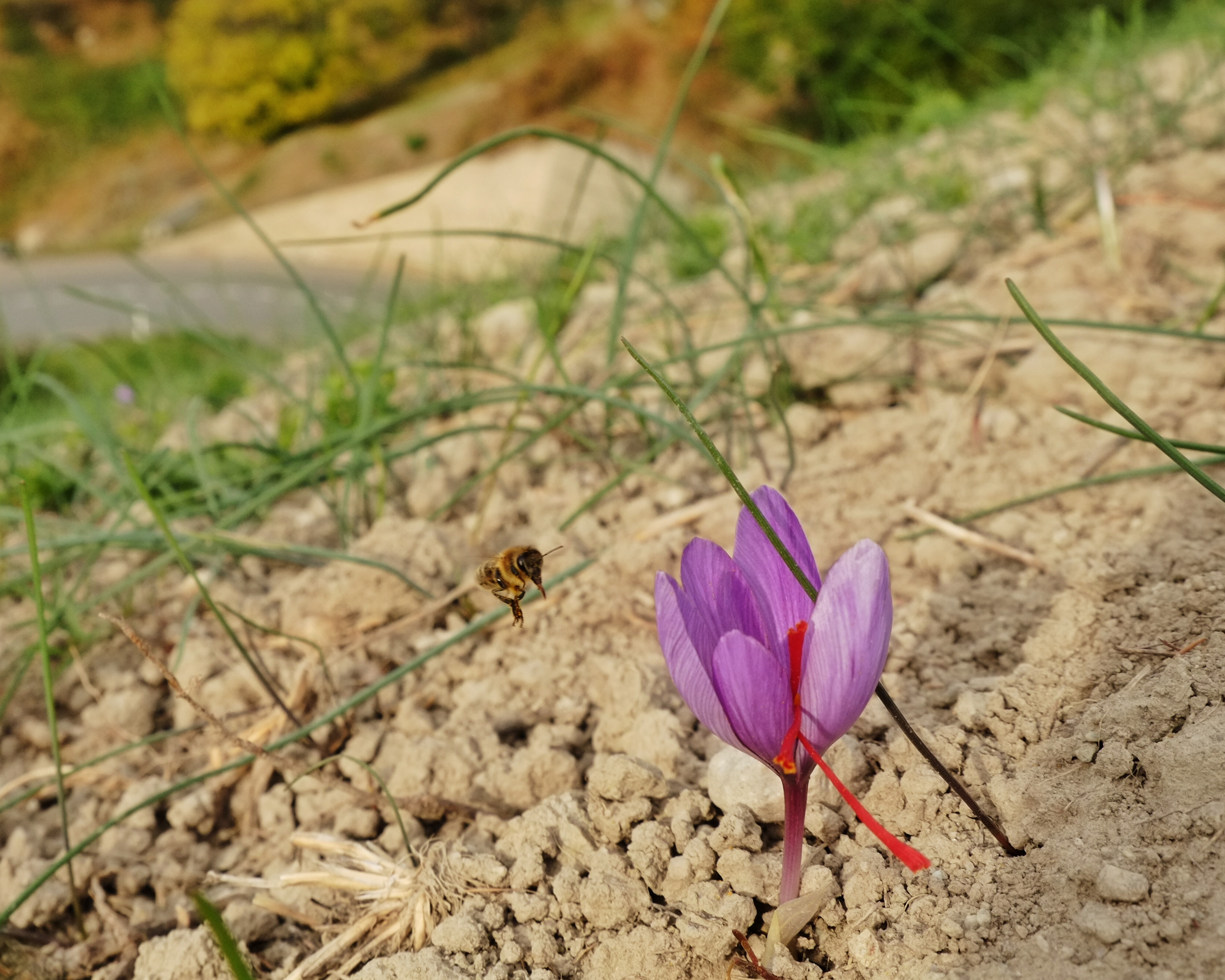
A saffron field in Mund

As of 2010, Mund had an unemployment rate of 0.5%. As of 2008, there were 60 people employed in the primary economic sector and about 41 businesses involved in this sector. 4 people were employed in the secondary sector and there were 3 businesses in this sector. 34 people were employed in the tertiary sector, with 11 businesses in this sector. There were 271 residents of the municipality who were employed in some capacity, of which females made up 32.8% of the workforce.

In 2008 the total number of full-time equivalent jobs was 43. The number of jobs in the primary sector was 18, all of which were in agriculture. The number of jobs in the secondary sector was 4, all of which were in construction. The number of jobs in the tertiary sector was 21. In the tertiary sector; 2 or 9.5% were in wholesale or retail sales or the repair of motor vehicles, 2 or 9.5% were in the movement and storage of goods, 5 or 23.8% were in a hotel or restaurant, 1 was the insurance or financial industry, 3 or 14.3% were technical professionals or scientists, 3 or 14.3% were in education.

In 2000, there were 11 workers who commuted into the municipality and 221 workers who commuted away. The municipality is a net exporter of workers, with about 20.1 workers leaving the municipality for every one entering. Of the working population, 34.7% used public transportation to get to work, and 53.9% used a private car.

== Religion ==
From the 2000 census, 544 or 94.8% were Roman Catholic, while 5 or 0.9% belonged to the Swiss Reformed Church. Of the rest of the population, there were 4 individuals (or about 0.70% of the population) who belonged to another Christian church. There was 1 individual who was Islamic. 7 (or about 1.22% of the population) belonged to no church, are agnostic or atheist, and 15 individuals (or about 2.61% of the population) did not answer the question.

== Education ==
In Mund about 193 or (33.6%) of the population have completed non-mandatory upper secondary education, and 22 or (3.8%) have completed additional higher education (either university or a Fachhochschule). Of the 22 who completed tertiary schooling, 77.3% were Swiss men, 22.7% were Swiss women.

During the 2010-2011 school year there were a total of 40 students in the Mund school system. The education system in the Canton of Valais allows young children to attend one year of non-obligatory Kindergarten. During that school year, there was one kindergarten class (KG1 or KG2) and 7 kindergarten students. The canton's school system requires students to attend six years of primary school. In Mund there were a total of 3 classes and 40 students in the primary school. The secondary school program consists of three lower, obligatory years of schooling (orientation classes), followed by three to five years of optional, advanced schools. All the lower secondary students from Mund attend their school in a neighboring municipality. All the upper secondary students attended school in another municipality.

As of 2000, there were 4 students in Mund who came from another municipality, while 49 residents attended schools outside the municipality.
