= Josef Ritler =

Swiss journalist (1939–2026)

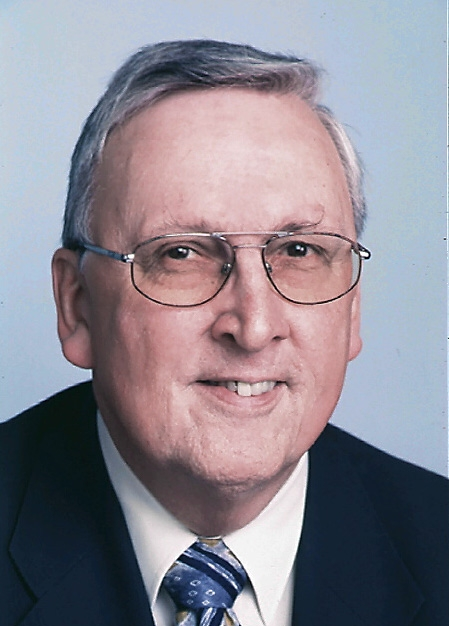
Josef Ritler in 2003

Josef "Sepp(i)" Ritler (1939 – 29 October 2026) was a Swiss journalist who worked as a writer and photographer for the newspaper Blick for 40 years. He was also employed as a video journalist for the central Swiss television station Tele Tell.

== Life and career ==
Ritler was born in Naters, in the canton of Valais. He went to the local primary school in his place of birth, Naters. Because of bullying, he was forced to change to a school in Brig. In his free time he often assisted his father in his work, who was a foreman, wanting to follow his father's profession when older. During his apprenticeship as a mason, he learnt that he had an allergy to cement and had to quit the course.

But he discovered his passion for photography and began photographing everything that crossed his way. He moved to Lucerne as it was one of the few locations where photography apprenticeships were offered. When Ritler accidentally photographed a film set producing an army propaganda film for the Swiss national exhibition "Expo 64", the paper Blick became interested in hiring Ritler as a journalist. The chief editor of the time, Werner Schollenberger, invited Ritler to write for the paper. Ritler was hesitant due to the reputation of Blick as a tabloid. He eventually accepted the job offer for one year only initially. Eventually he would work for Blick for forty years.

The journalist managed to become something of an intermediary between the more conservative people of central Switzerland and the modern Zurich team of Blick. Ritler's character attracted a considerable amount of curiosity and trouble; on occasion he was chased by farmers with pitchforks, his tyres were slit, he received death threats and for a while was only able to work under police protection.

One of Ritler's attributes is his curiosity for the "people behind the headlines", such as in the case of the chainsaw vigilante where Ritler was keen to find out more about the person behind the story.

He was only interested in real news. Because of that, he often held interviews after conferences, not during. When the Kapellbrücke was on fire, Ritler was there.

At the age of 64, Ritler was retired early (one year before the regular Swiss retirement age) and had to leave Blick. He had a number of job offers and finally accepted the offer of Tele Tell, where he is now working as a video-journalist.

Ritler later worked in television for the first time. Within this young team, Ritler had a reputation for being a "total professional who knew central Switzerland like no one else" and who had an "eye for the perfect picture".

Ritler died on 29 October 2026, at the age of 87.

== Awards ==
- 1997 "Swiss Press Foto"
- 2003 "Ringier Medienpreis"
- 2007 Lifetime-Award Schweizerischer Berufsfotografenverband
