= Brig District =

Coordinates: 46°18′42″N 7°59′6″E

Brig Bezirk Brig
- District
- Flag Coat of arms
- Country: Switzerland
- Canton: Valais
- Capital: Brig-Glis

Area
  - Total: 434.5 km^{2} (167.8 sq mi)

Population (2020)
  - Total: 27,360
  - Density: 62.97/km^{2} (163.1/sq mi)
- Time zone: UTC+1 (CET)
  - Summer (DST): UTC+2 (CEST)
- Municipalities: 7

The district of Brig is a district in the canton of Valais, Switzerland. It has a population of 27,360 (as of 31 December 2020).

== Municipalities ==
It includes the following municipalities:

| Coat of arms | Municipality | Population (31 December 2020) | Area km^{2} |
|---|---|---|---|
| Brig-Glis | Brig-Glis | 13,221 | 38.08 |
| Eggerberg | Eggerberg | 324 | 5.94 |
| Naters | Naters | 10,290 | 147.22 |
| Ried-Brig | Ried-Brig | 2,141 | 47.5 |
| Simplon | Simplon | 292 | 90.82 |
| Termen | Termen | 1,021 | 18.73 |
| Zwischbergen | Zwischbergen | 71 | 86.15 |
| | Total | 27,360 | 434.26 |

== Coat of arms ==
The blazon of the municipal coat of arms is Or, an Eagle with dragon's tail displayed Sable, crowned, beaked, langued, membered and tailed Gules.

== Demographics ==
Brig has a population (as of December 2020) of 27,360. Most of the population (as of 2000) speaks German (21,176 or 91.9%) as their first language, Italian is the second most common (434 or 1.9%) and French is the third (316 or 1.4%). There are 17 people who speak Romansh.

As of 2008, the gender distribution of the population was 48.5% male and 51.5% female. The population was made up of 10,437 Swiss men (42.6% of the population) and 1,449 (5.9%) non-Swiss men. There were 11,126 Swiss women (45.4%) and 1,512 (6.2%) non-Swiss women.

Of the population in the district 9,899 or about 42.9% were born in Brig and lived there in 2000. There were 7,813 or 33.9% who were born in the same canton, while 2,196 or 9.5% were born somewhere else in Switzerland, and 2,463 or 10.7% were born outside of Switzerland.

As of 2000, there were 9,857 people who were single and never married in the district. There were 11,064 married individuals, 1,331 widows or widowers and 800 individuals who are divorced.

There were 2,556 households that consist of only one person and 645 households with five or more people. Out of a total of 9,179 households that answered this question, 27.8% were households made up of just one person and there were 125 adults who lived with their parents. Of the rest of the households, there are 2,450 married couples without children, 3,165 married couples with children. There were 475 single parents with a child or children. There were 147 households that were made up of unrelated people and 261 households that were made up of some sort of institution or another collective housing.

The historical population is given in the following chart:

== Mergers and name changes ==
On 1 October 1972 the former municipalities of Brig, Brigerbad and Glis merged to form the new municipality of Brig-Glis.

On 1 January 2013 the former municipalities of Birgisch and Mund merged into the municipality of Naters.

== Politics ==
In the 2007 Swiss federal election the most popular party was the CVP which received 54.67% of the vote. The next three most popular parties were the SVP (21.66%), the SP (15.85%) and the FDP (5.48%). In the federal election, a total of 10,625 votes were cast, and the voter turnout was 59.0%.

In the 2009 Conseil d'État/Staatsrat election a total of 9,701 votes were cast, of which 969 or about 10.0% were invalid. The voter participation was 54.1%, which is similar to the cantonal average of 54.67%. In the 2007 Swiss Council of States election a total of 10,530 votes were cast, of which 603 or about 5.7% were invalid. The voter participation was 59.0%, which is similar to the cantonal average of 59.88%.

== Religion ==
From the 2000 census, 19,711 or 85.5% were Roman Catholic, while 1,067 or 4.6% belonged to the Swiss Reformed Church. Of the rest of the population, there were 265 members of an Orthodox church (or about 1.15% of the population), there were 4 individuals (or about 0.02% of the population) who belonged to the Christian Catholic Church, and there were 365 individuals (or about 1.58% of the population) who belonged to another Christian church. There was 1 individual who was Jewish, and 592 (or about 2.57% of the population) who were Islamic. There were 31 individuals who were Buddhist, 25 individuals who were Hindu and 10 individuals who belonged to another church. 453 (or about 1.97% of the population) belonged to no church, are agnostic or atheist, and 707 individuals (or about 3.07% of the population) did not answer the question.

== Weather ==
Brig municipality has an average of 85 days of rain or snow per year and on average receives 735 mm (28.9 in) of precipitation. The wettest month is November during which time Brig receives an average of 81 mm (3.2 in) of rain or snow. During this month there is precipitation for an average of 7.5 days. The month with the most days of precipitation is January, with an average of 7.9, but with only 65 mm (2.6 in) of rain or snow. The driest month of the year is September with an average of 37 mm (1.5 in) of precipitation over 5.4 days.

== Education ==
In Brig about 8,589 or (37.3%) of the population have completed non-mandatory upper secondary education, and 2,232 or (9.7%) have completed additional higher education (either University or a Fachhochschule). Of the 2,232 who completed tertiary schooling, 65.6% were Swiss men, 20.6% were Swiss women, 8.2% were non-Swiss men and 5.6% were non-Swiss women.
