= Naters =

- Municipality
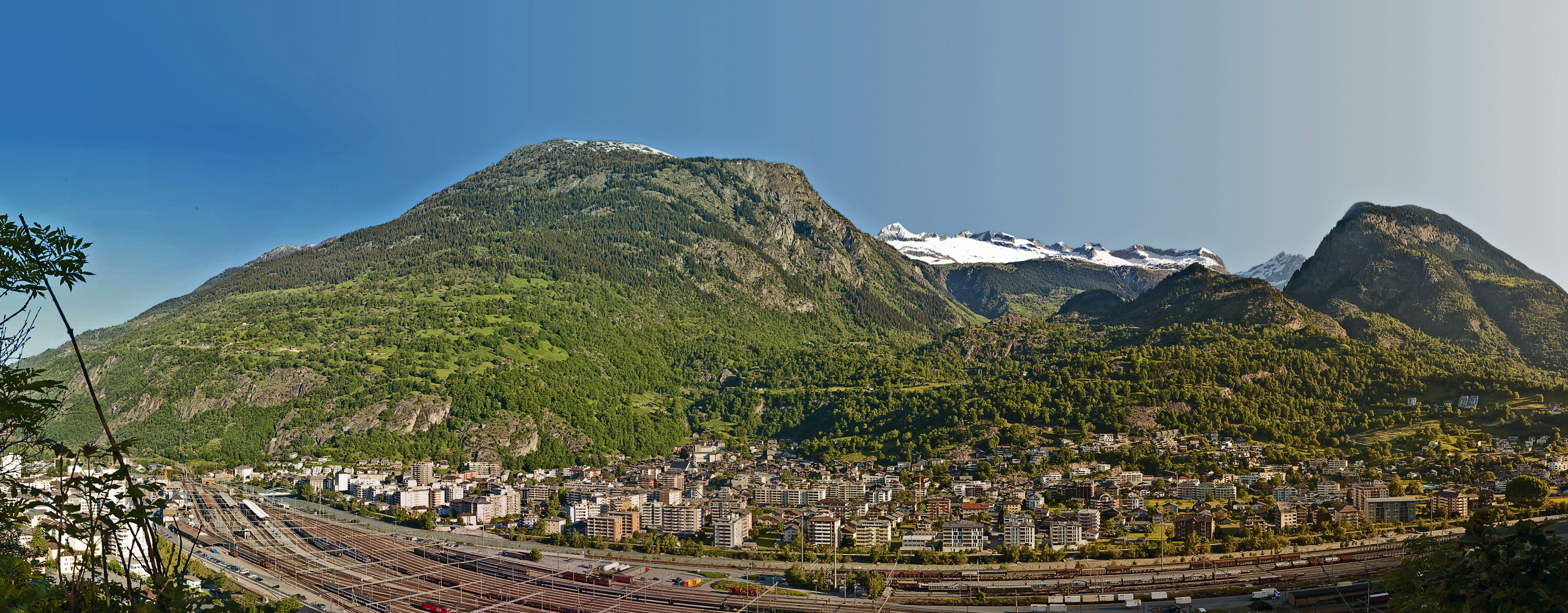
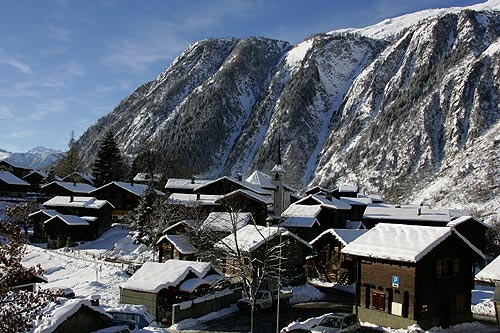
- Naters Blatten

- Flag Coat of arms
- Location of Naters
- Location within Switzerland Location within Canton of Valais
- Coordinates: 46°19′N 7°59′E
- Country: Switzerland
- Canton: Valais
- District: Brig

Government
  - Mayor: Gemeindepräsident (list); Charlotte Salzmann-Briand The Centre (as of 2024)

Area
  - Total: 101.26 km^{2} (39.10 sq mi)
- Elevation: 673 m (2,208 ft)

Population (2005)
  - Total: 7,810
  - Density: 77.1/km^{2} (200/sq mi)
- Time zone: UTC+01:00 (CET)
  - Summer (DST): UTC+02:00 (CEST)
- Postal code: 3904
- SFOS number: 6007
- ISO 3166 code: CH-VS
- Surrounded by: Baltschieder, Betten, Birgisch, Bitsch, Blatten (Lötschen), Brig-Glis, Fieschertal, Mund, Riederalp, Termen
- Twin towns: Ornavasso (Italy)
- Website: www.naters.ch

Naters (Swiss Standard German pronunciation: [ˈnaːtərs]) is a municipality in the district of Brig in the canton of Valais in Switzerland. On 1 January 2013 the former municipalities of Birgisch and Mund merged into the municipality of Naters, which also includes the villages of Hegdorn, Geimen, Mehlbaum, Rischinen and Blatten bei Naters.

== History ==
Aerial view (1955)

Naters is first mentioned in 1018 as Nares.

== Geography ==
Naters has an area, as of 2011, of 101.3 square kilometers (39.1 mi^{2}). Of this area, 16.5% is used for agricultural purposes, while 9.0% is forested. Of the rest of the land, 1.8% is settled (buildings or roads) and 72.7% is unproductive land.

The municipality is located in the Brig district, on the right bank of the Rhone river on the gently sloping alluvial country around the Kelchbach. It covers the entire Natischer mountain between Kelchbach and the Mass. It consists of the villages of Naters, Hegdorn, Geimen, Mehlbaum, Rischinen and Blatten, and the mountain village and ski resort of Belalp.

== Coat of arms ==
The blazon of the municipal coat of arms is Gules, between two Crosiers Or in saltire in chief a Mitre of the same.

== Demographics ==
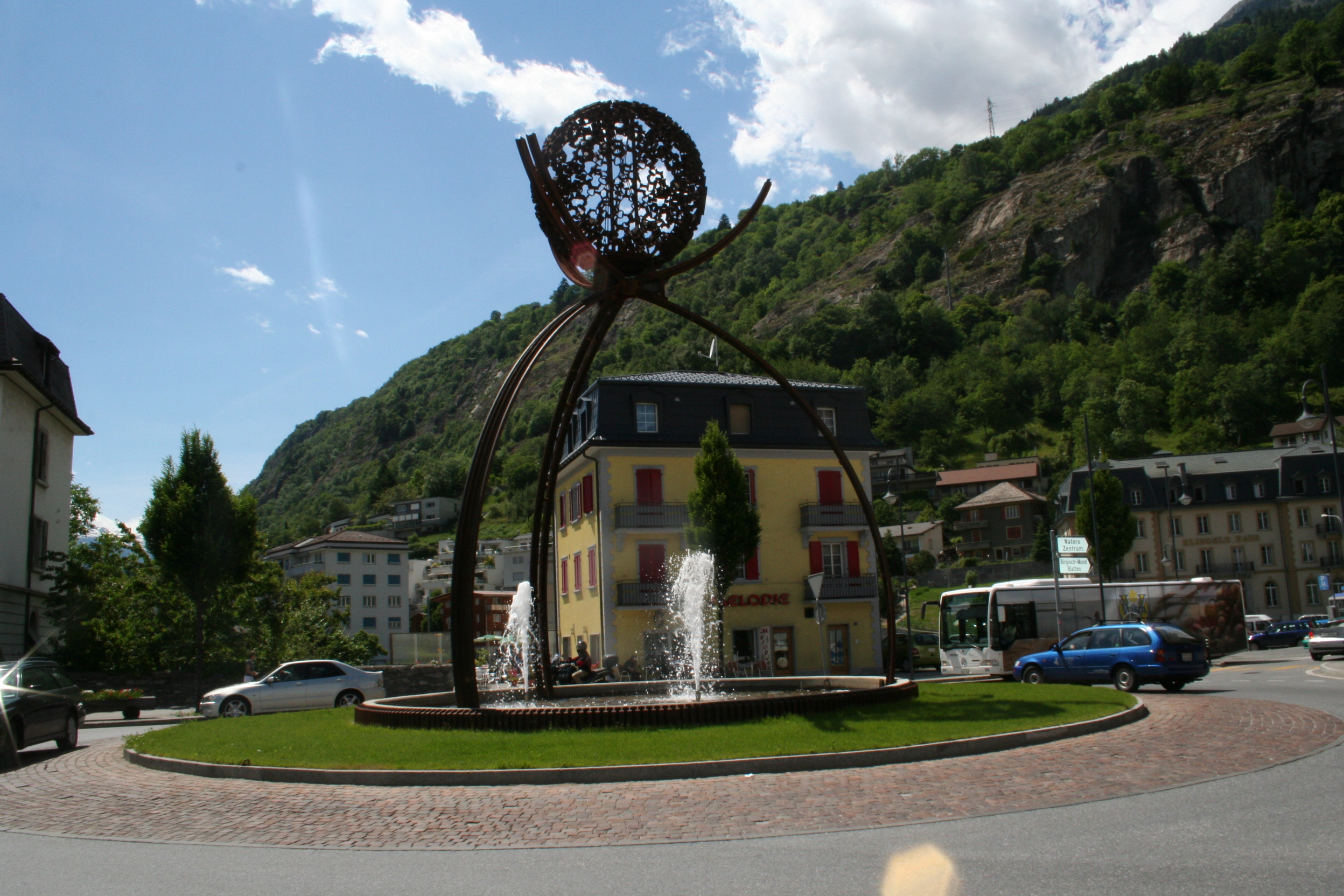
Sonnengesang sculpture in Naters

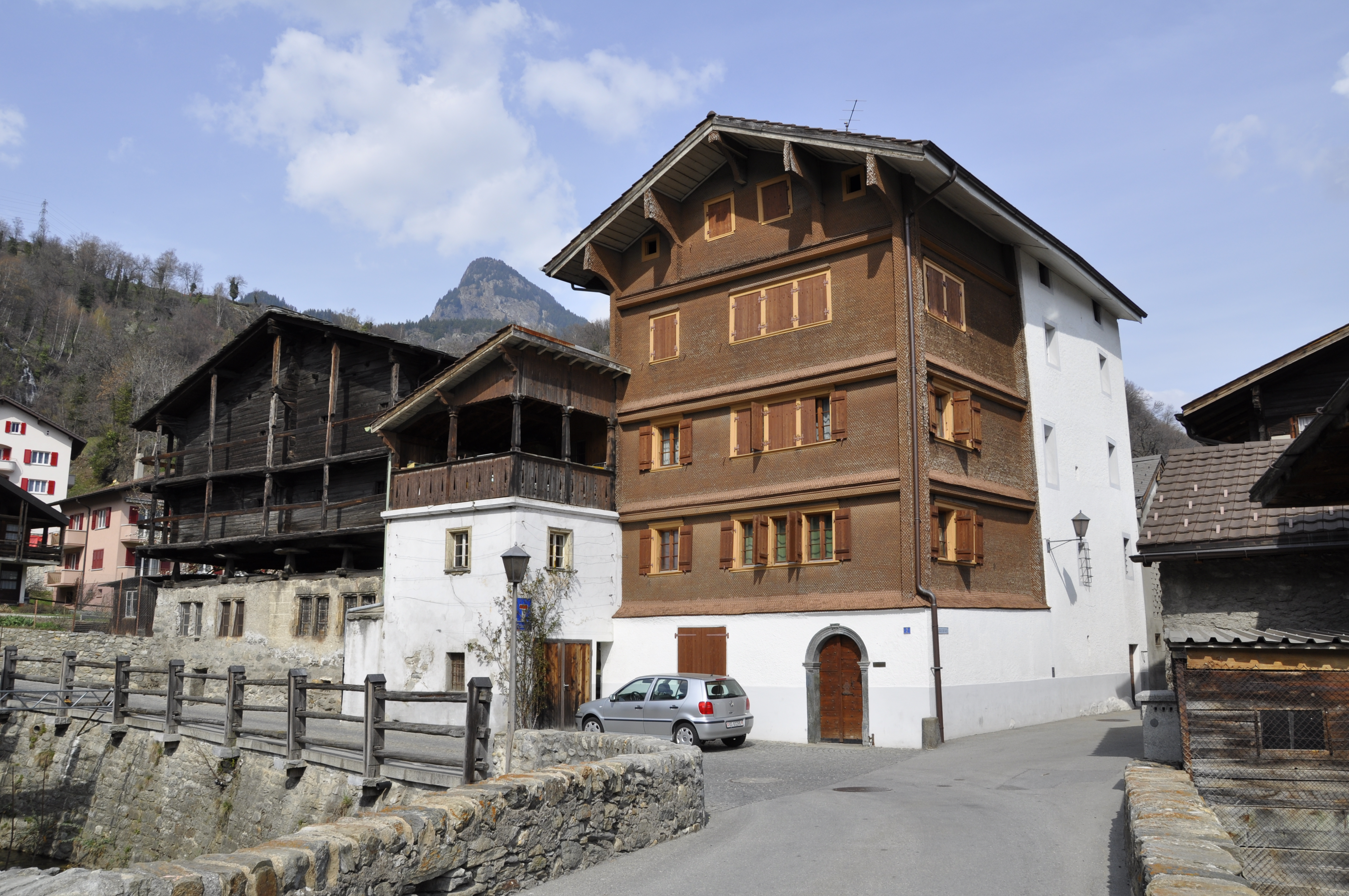
Houses in Naters

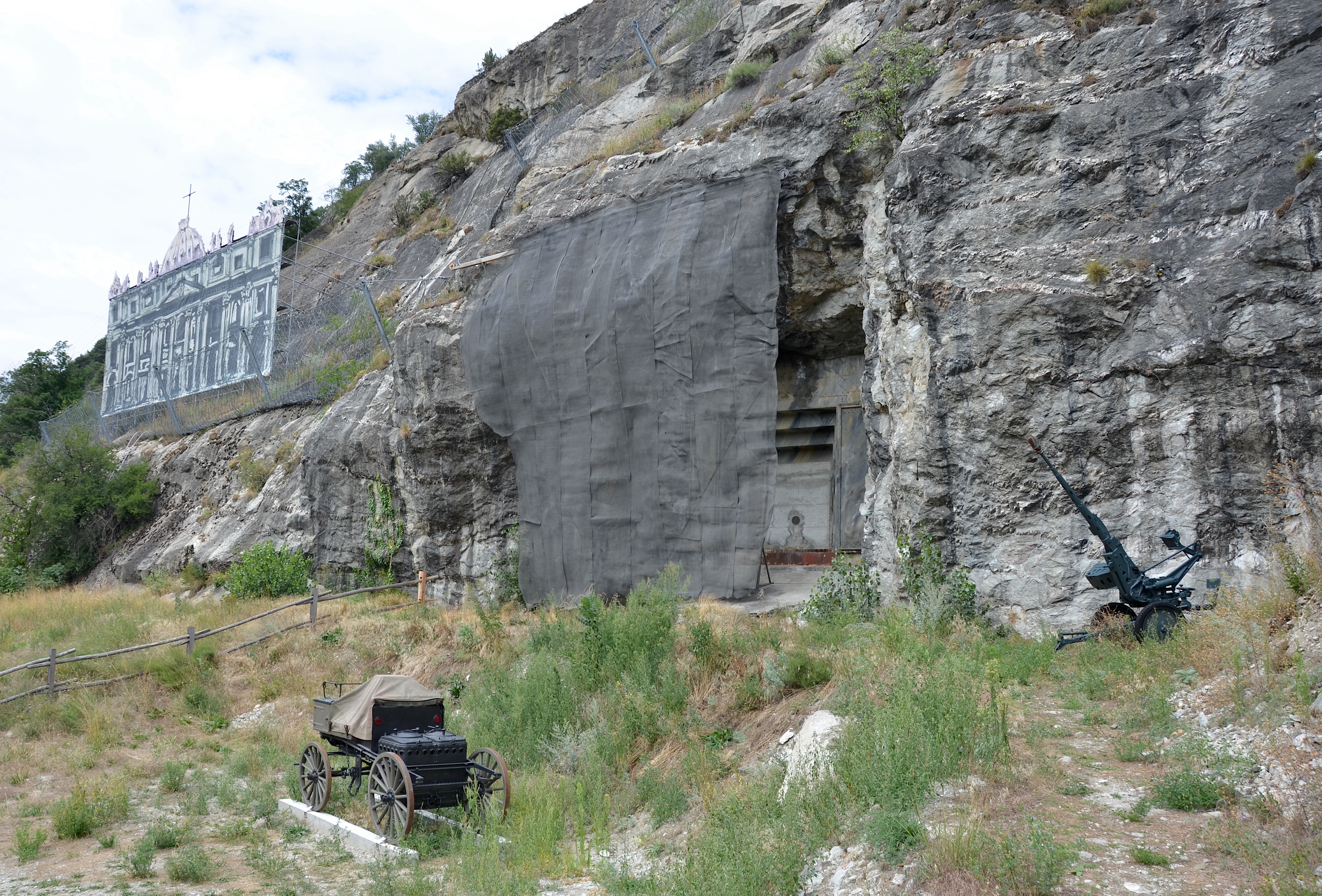
The Simplon Fortress in the mountain at Naters, from the time of the Second World War

Naters has a population (as of December 2020) of 10,290. As of 2008, 11.9% of the population are resident foreign nationals. Over the last 10 years (1999–2009) the population has changed at a rate of 6.9%. It has changed at a rate of 5.7% due to migration and at a rate of -0.1% due to births and deaths.

Most of the population (as of 2000) speaks German (6,902 or 91.8%) as their first language, Italian is the second most common (188 or 2.5%) and Albanian is the third (101 or 1.3%). There are 79 people who speak French and 7 people who speak Romansh.

As of 2008, the gender distribution of the population was 48.4% male and 51.6% female. The population was made up of 3,403 Swiss men (42.0% of the population) and 512 (6.3%) non-Swiss men. There were 3,671 Swiss women (45.3%) and 510 (6.3%) non-Swiss women. Of the population in the municipality 3,252 or about 43.3% were born in Naters and lived there in 2000. There were 2,579 or 34.3% who were born in the same canton, while 687 or 9.1% were born somewhere else in Switzerland, and 796 or 10.6% were born outside of Switzerland. The age distribution of the population (as of 2000) is children and teenagers (0–19 years old) make up 24.1% of the population, while adults (20–64 years old) make up 59.9% and seniors (over 64 years old) make up 16%.

As of 2000, there were 3,026 people who were single and never married in the municipality. There were 3,774 married individuals, 451 widows or widowers and 264 individuals who are divorced.

As of 2000, there were 3,020 private households in the municipality, and an average of 2.4 persons per household. There were 869 households that consist of only one person and 198 households with five or more people. Out of a total of 3,100 households that answered this question, 28.0% were households made up of just one person and there were 40 adults who lived with their parents. Of the rest of the households, there are 885 married couples without children, 1,032 married couples with children. There were 147 single parents with a child or children. There were 47 households that were made up of unrelated people and 80 households that were made up of some sort of institution or another collective housing.

In 2000 there were 932 single family homes (or 54.9% of the total) out of a total of 1,699 inhabited buildings. There were 546 multi-family buildings (32.1%), along with 120 multi-purpose buildings that were mostly used for housing (7.1%) and 101 other use buildings (commercial or industrial) that also had some housing (5.9%).

In 2000, a total of 2,882 apartments (69.1% of the total) were permanently occupied, while 1,049 apartments (25.1%) were seasonally occupied and 242 apartments (5.8%) were empty. As of 2009, the construction rate of new housing units was 10.9 new units per 1000 residents.

The historical population is given in the following chart:

== Heritage sites of national significance ==
The Ossuary at Beinhausweg and the Church of St. Mauritius are listed as Swiss heritage site of national significance. The urbanized village of Naters, the village of Blatten and the entire hamlet of Bodmen are part of the Inventory of Swiss Heritage Sites.

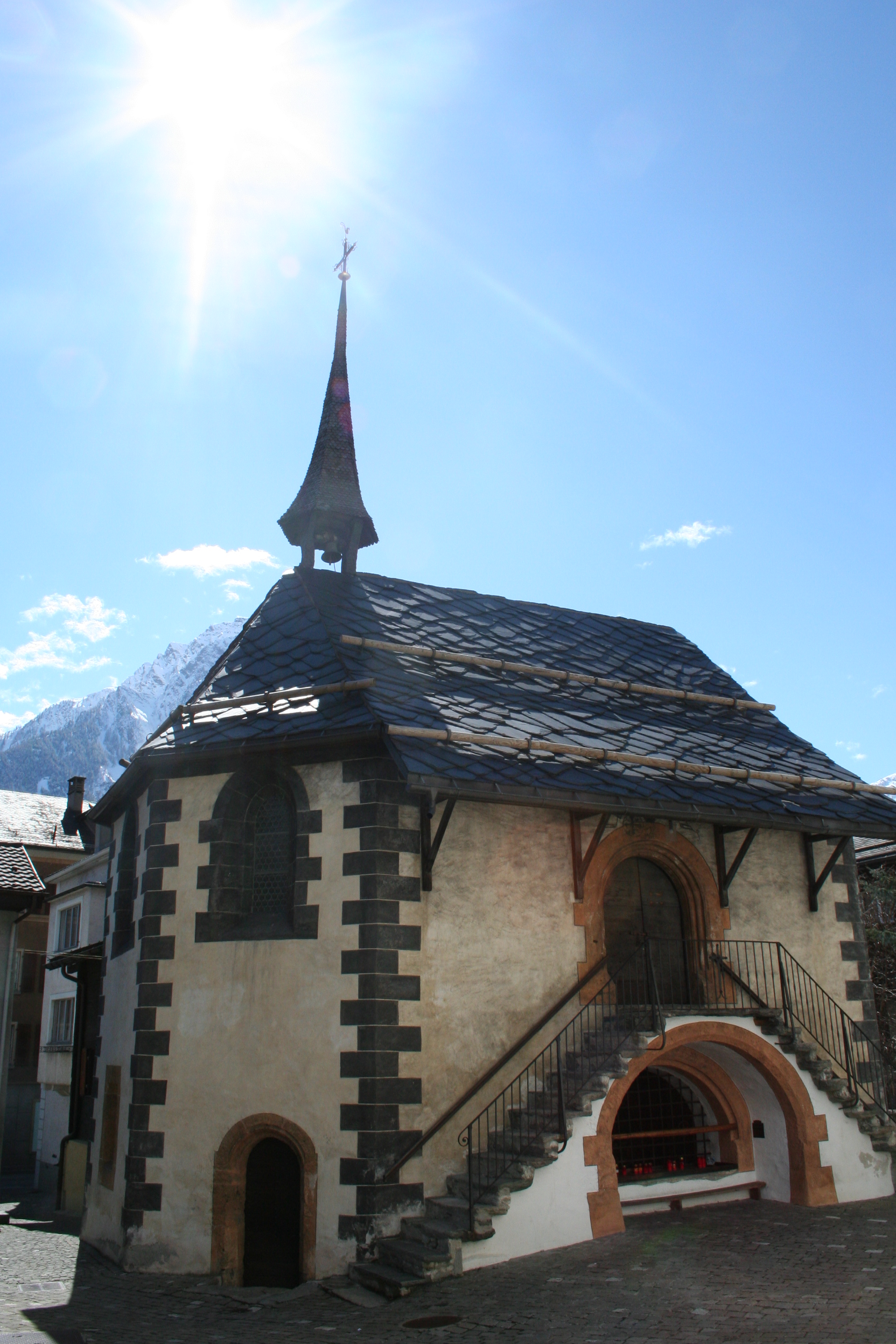
Ossuary

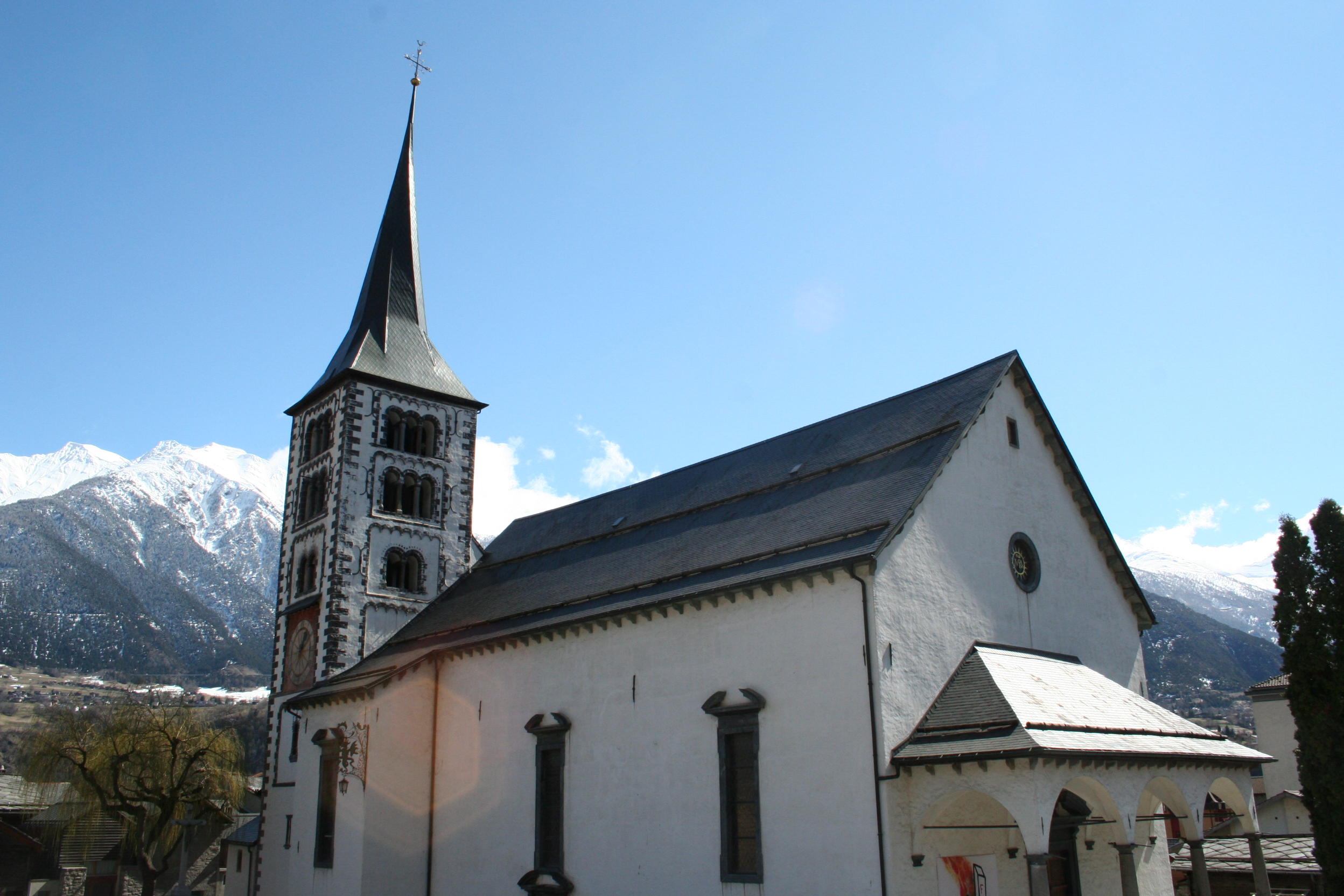
Church of St. Mauritius

== Politics ==
In the 2007 federal election the most popular party was the CVP which received 46.41% of the vote. The next three most popular parties were the SVP (28.69%), the SP (19.11%) and the FDP (4.14%). In the federal election, a total of 3,617 votes were cast, and the voter turnout was 59.6%.

In the 2009 Conseil d'État/Staatsrat election a total of 3,301 votes were cast, of which 296 or about 9.0% were invalid. The voter participation was 54.6%, which is similar to the cantonal average of 54.67%. In the 2007 Swiss Council of States election a total of 3,587 votes were cast, of which 189 or about 5.3% were invalid. The voter participation was 59.6%, which is similar to the cantonal average of 59.88%.

== Economy ==
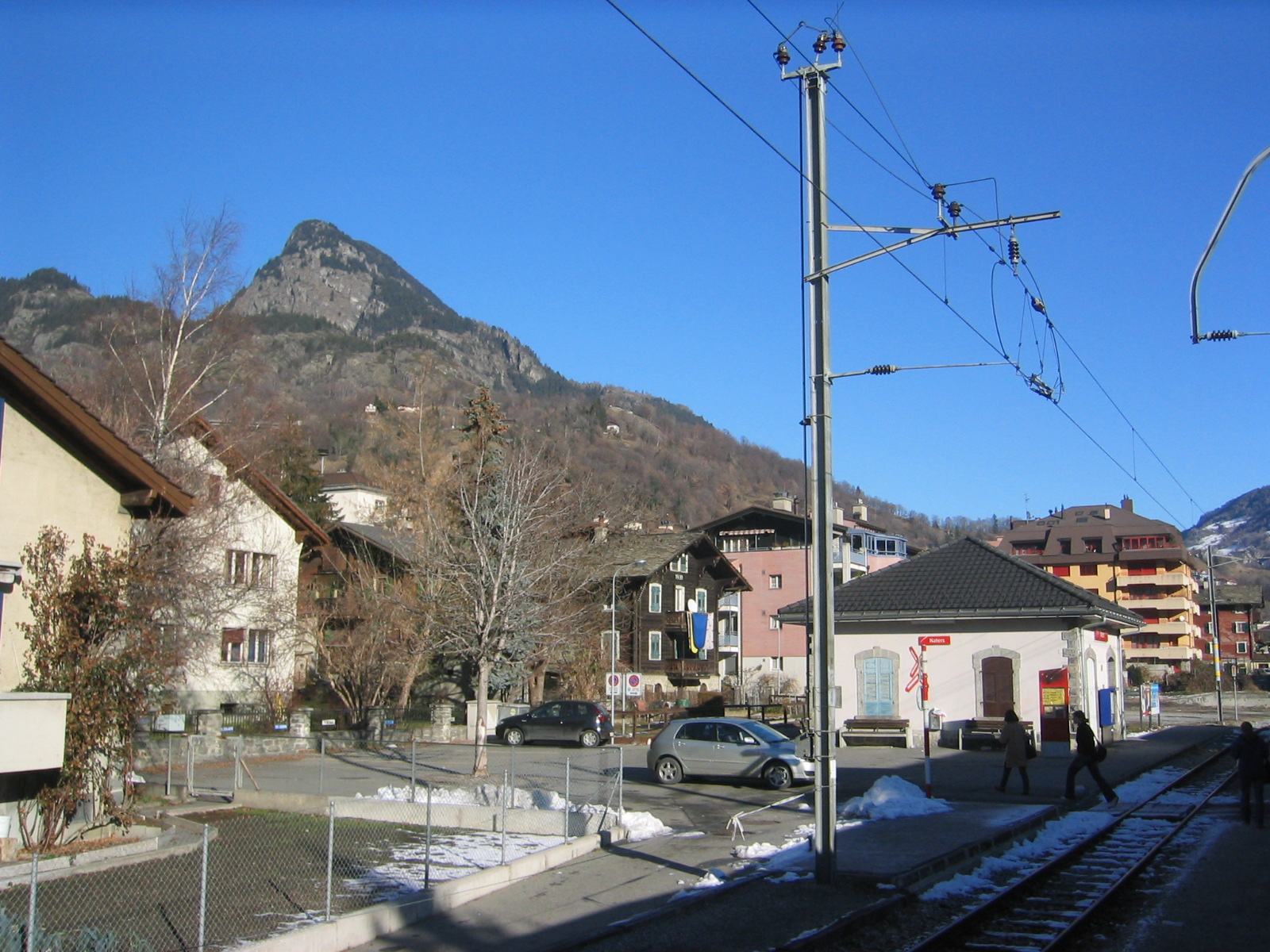
Rail line of the Matterhorn-Gotthard railway in Naters

In 2010, Naters had an unemployment rate of 2.3%. As of 2008, there were 142 people employed in the primary economic sector and about 71 businesses involved in this sector. 564 people were employed in the secondary sector and there were 59 businesses in this sector. 1,009 people were employed in the tertiary sector, with 187 businesses in this sector. There were 3,581 residents of the municipality who were employed in some capacity, of which females made up 40.5% of the workforce.

In 2008 the total number of full-time equivalent jobs was 1,381. The number of jobs in the primary sector was 57, of which 50 were in agriculture and 7 were in forestry or lumber production. The number of jobs in the secondary sector was 536 of which 184 or (34.3%) were in manufacturing, 2 or (0.4%) were in mining and 350 (65.3%) were in construction. The number of jobs in the tertiary sector was 788. In the tertiary sector; 162 or 20.6% were in wholesale or retail sales or the repair of motor vehicles, 30 or 3.8% were in the movement and storage of goods, 176 or 22.3% were in a hotel or restaurant, 35 or 4.4% were the insurance or financial industry, 97 or 12.3% were technical professionals or scientists, 70 or 8.9% were in education and 132 or 16.8% were in health care.

In 2000, there were 925 workers who commuted into the municipality and 2,480 workers who commuted away. The municipality is a net exporter of workers, with about 2.7 workers leaving the municipality for every one entering. About 15.4% of the workforce coming into Naters are coming from outside Switzerland. Of the working population, 23.4% used public transportation to get to work, and 41.9% used a private car.

== Religion ==
From the 2000 census, 6,525 or 86.8% were Roman Catholic, while 282 or 3.8% belonged to the Swiss Reformed Church. Of the rest of the population, there were 86 members of an Orthodox church (or about 1.14% of the population), there were 2 individuals (or about 0.03% of the population) who belonged to the Christian Catholic Church, and there were 86 individuals (or about 1.14% of the population) who belonged to another Christian church. There were 233 (or about 3.10% of the population) who were Islamic. There were 10 individuals who were Buddhist, 3 individuals who were Hindu and 5 individuals who belonged to another church. 100 (or about 1.33% of the population) belonged to no church, are agnostic or atheist, and 225 individuals (or about 2.99% of the population) did not answer the question.

== Education ==
In Naters about 2,860 or (38.1%) of the population have completed non-mandatory upper secondary education, and 594 or (7.9%) have completed additional higher education (either university or a Fachhochschule). Of the 594 who completed tertiary schooling, 70.5% were Swiss men, 20.0% were Swiss women, 5.6% were non-Swiss men and 3.9% were non-Swiss women.

During the 2010-2011 school year there were a total of 762 students in the Naters school system. The education system in the Canton of Valais allows young children to attend one year of non-obligatory Kindergarten. During that school year, there 7 kindergarten classes (KG1 or KG2) and 151 kindergarten students. The canton's school system requires students to attend six years of primary school. In Naters there were a total of 25 classes and 536 students in the primary school. The secondary school program consists of three lower, obligatory years of schooling (orientation classes), followed by three to five years of optional, advanced schools. There were 226 lower secondary students who attended school in Naters. All the upper secondary students attended school in another municipality.

As of 2000, there were 324 students in Naters who came from another municipality, while 289 residents attended schools outside the municipality.

Naters is home to the Gemeindebibliothek (municipal library of Naters). The library has (as of 2008) 17,945 books or other media, and loaned out 47,534 items in the same year. It was open a total of 264 days with average of 16 hours per week during that year.

== Sport ==
The village is home to FC Naters. The team currently plays in Liga 1., the third highest tier in the Swiss football pyramid.

Professional hockey player Nico Hischier, and his brother Luca, were born and raised in Naters and learned to play the game of hockey in nearby Visp. Nico was a highly rated prospect leading up to the 2017 NHL Draft, where he was selected 1st overall by the New Jersey Devils. He became the first Swiss player in NHL history to be chosen with the first overall pick.

== Notable people ==
- Josef Ritler, journalist
- Nico Hischier, hockey player
