= Ried-Brig =

- Municipality
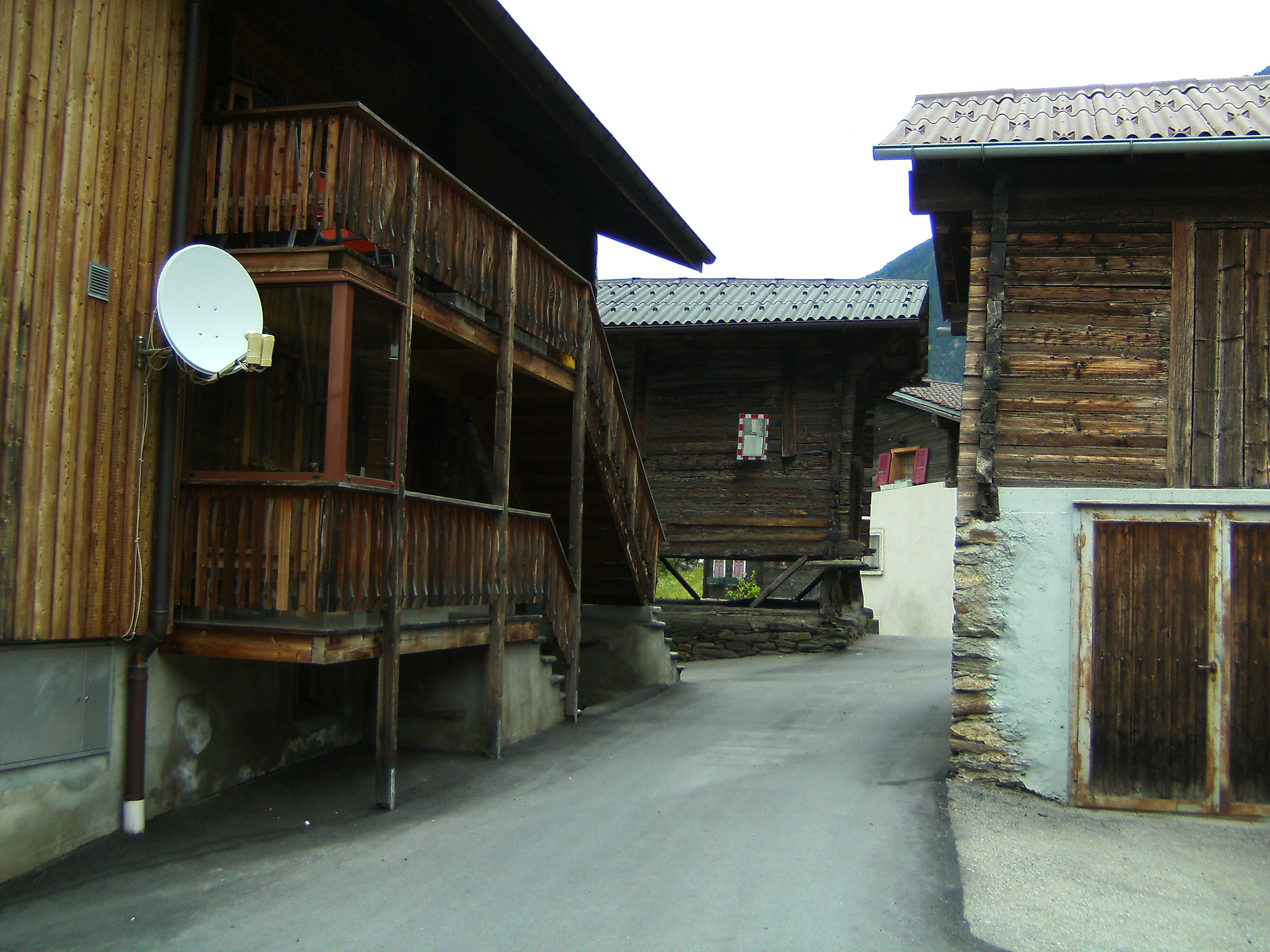
- Houses in Ried-Brig village

- Flag Coat of arms
- Location of Ried-Brig
- Location within Switzerland Location within Canton of Valais
- Coordinates: 46°19′N 8°1′E
- Country: Switzerland
- Canton: Valais
- District: Brig

Government
  - Mayor: Herbert Schmidhalter

Area
  - Total: 47.53 km^{2} (18.35 sq mi)
- Elevation: 918 m (3,012 ft)

Population (December 2003)
  - Total: 1,860
  - Density: 39.1/km^{2} (101/sq mi)
- Time zone: UTC+01:00 (CET)
  - Summer (DST): UTC+02:00 (CEST)
- Postal code: 3911
- SFOS number: 6008
- ISO 3166 code: CH-VS
- Localities: Berisal
- Surrounded by: Brig-Glis, Grengiols, Simplon, Termen, Varzo (IT-VB), Zwischbergen
- Website: www.ried-brig.ch

Ried-Brig is a municipality in the district of Brig in the canton of Valais in Switzerland.

== History ==
Ried-Brig is first mentioned in 1232 as Riet. In 1428 it was mentioned as ried de briga. Until 1993 it was officially known as Ried bei Brig.

== Geography ==
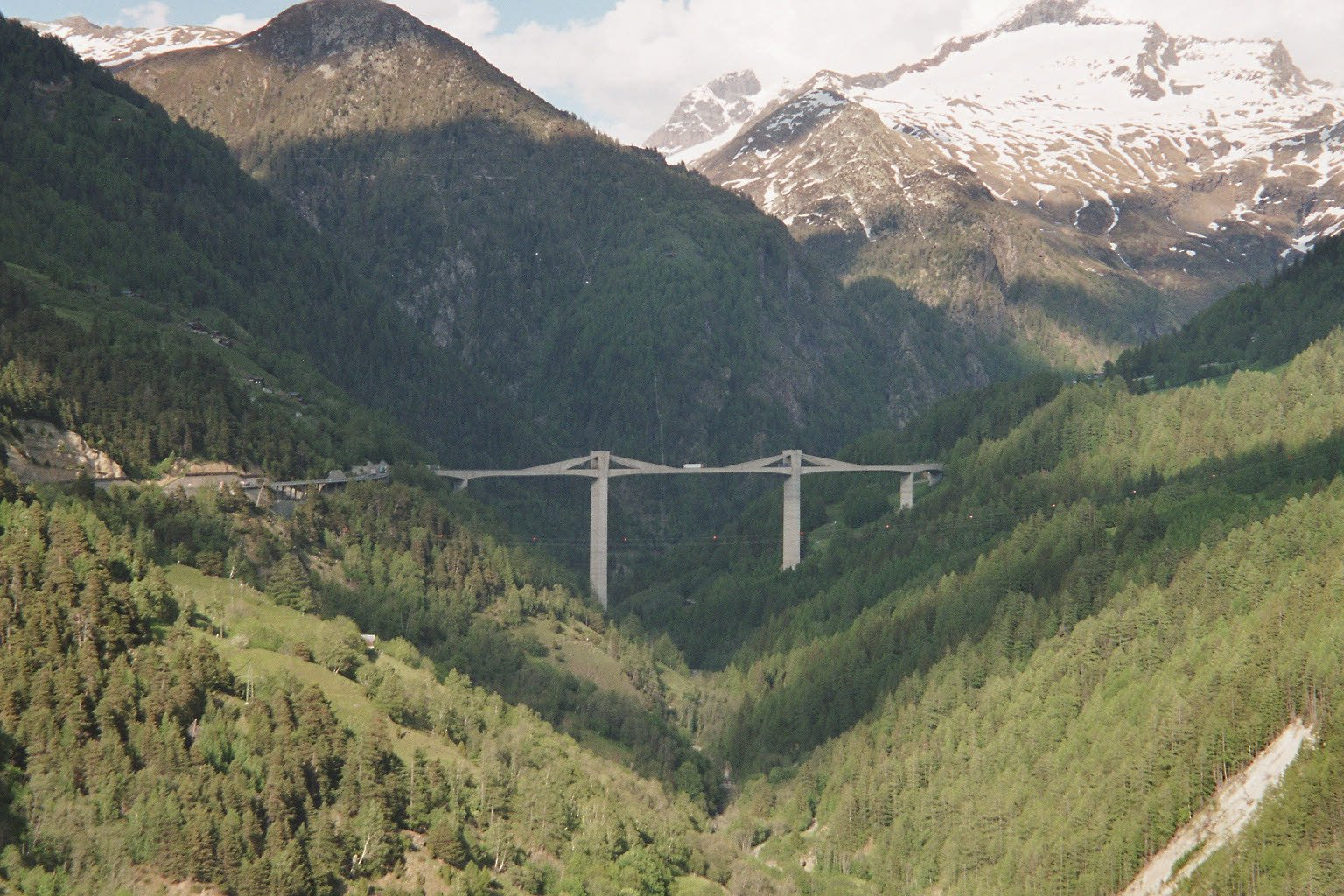
Modern Ganter valley bridge, near Ried-Brig

Ried-Brig has an area, as of 2011, of 47.5 square kilometers (18.3 mi^{2}). Of this area, 19.0% is used for agricultural purposes, while 30.7% is forested. Of the rest of the land, 2.7% is settled (buildings or roads) and 47.6% is unproductive land.

The municipality is located in the Brig district, above Brig and on the Simplon Pass road.

== Coat of arms ==
The blazon of the municipal coat of arms is Argent, issuant from Coupeaux Vert three Pine-trees Vert trunked proper.

== Demographics ==
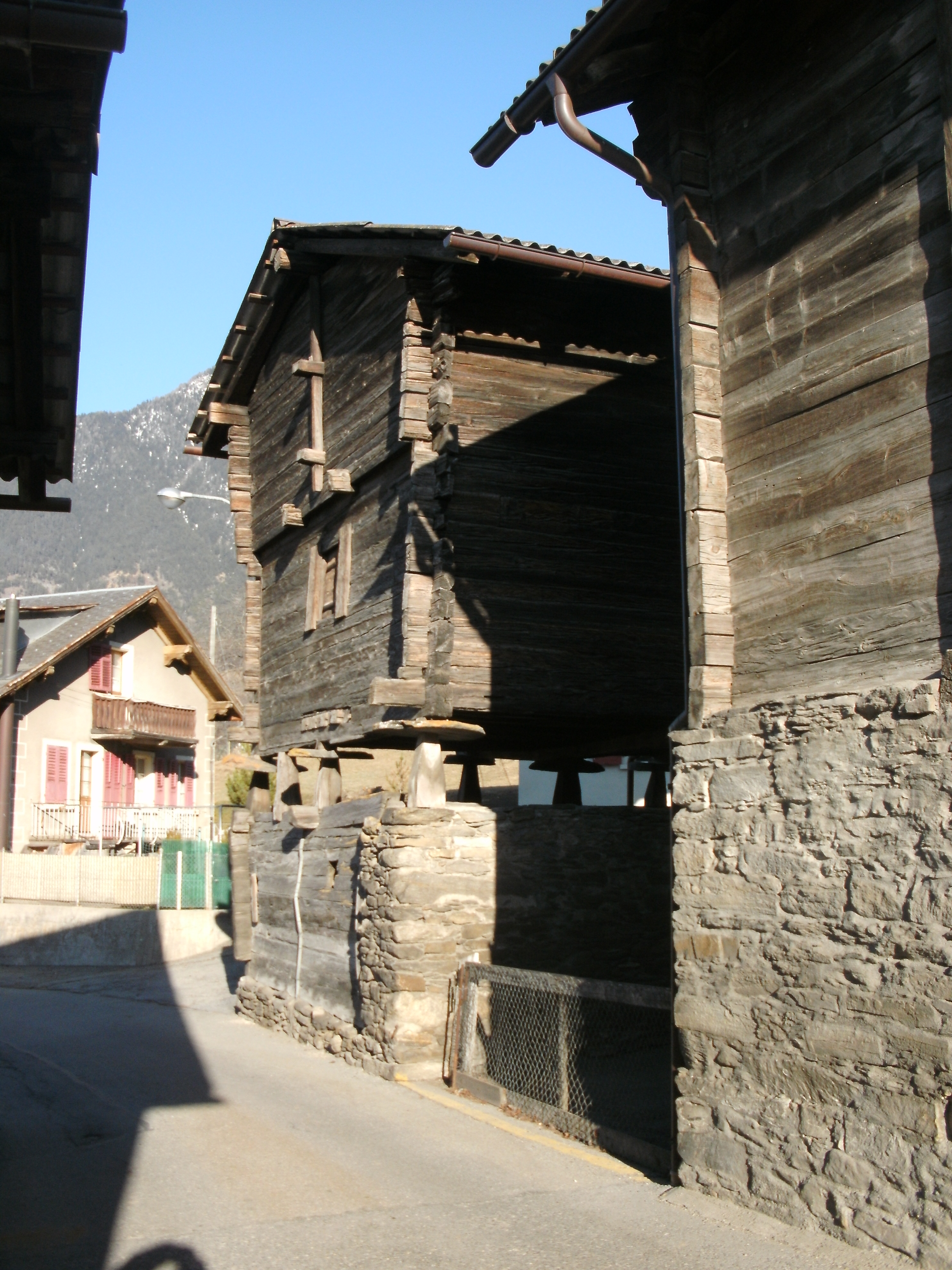
Traditional houses in Ried-Brig

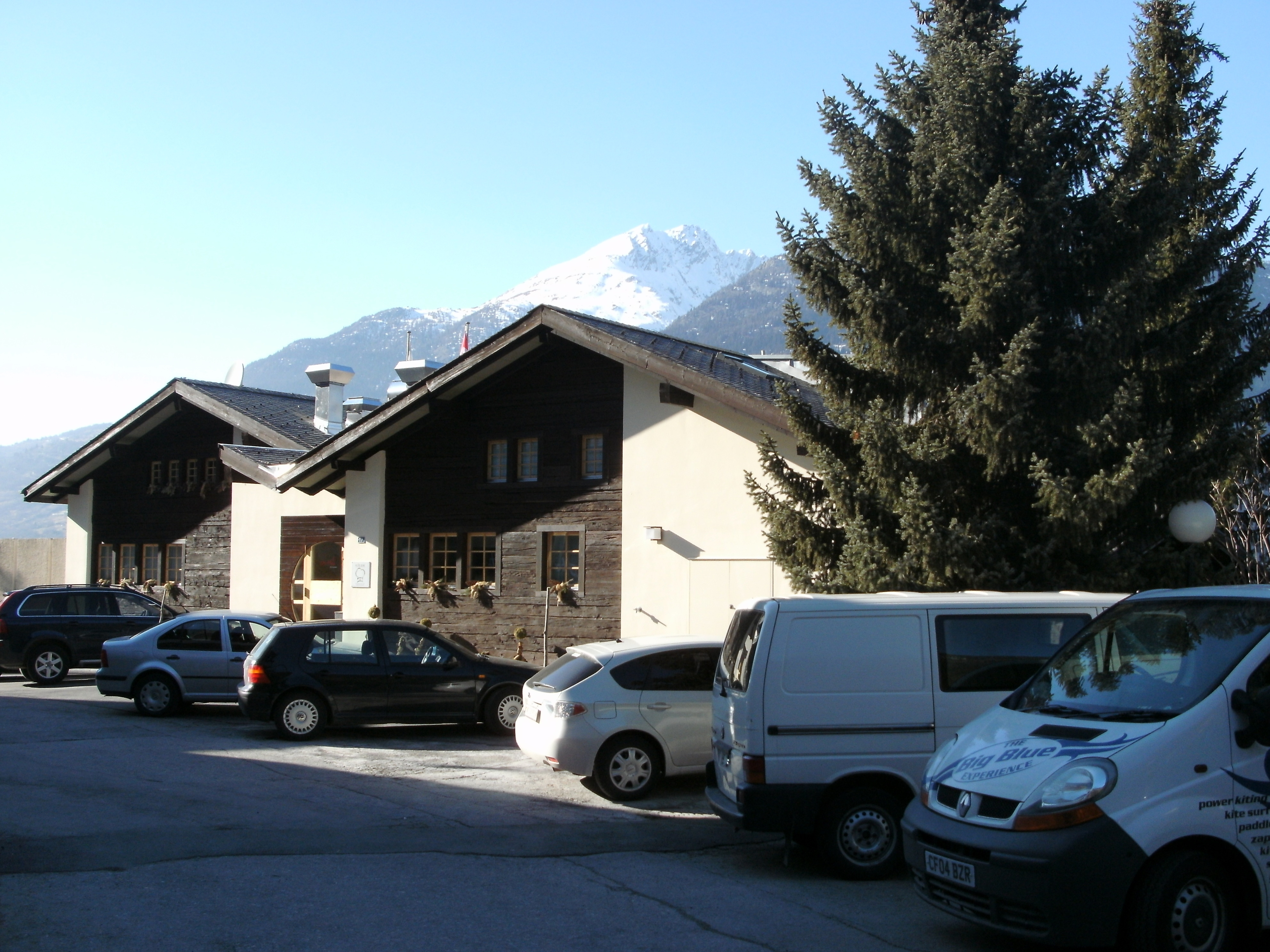
Modern houses in Ried-Brig

Ried-Brig has a population (as of December 2020) of 2,141. As of 2008, 6.1% of the population are resident foreign nationals. Over the last 10 years (1999–2009 ) the population has changed at a rate of 3.4%. It has changed at a rate of 5.3% due to migration and at a rate of 3.8% due to births and deaths.

Most of the population (as of 2000) speaks German (1,519 or 96.0%) as their first language, French is the second most common (21 or 1.3%) and Italian is the third (13 or 0.8%). There is 1 person who speaks Romansh.

As of 2008, the gender distribution of the population was 50.6% male and 49.4% female. The population was made up of 833 Swiss men (47.5% of the population) and 54 (3.1%) non-Swiss men. There were 818 Swiss women (46.7%) and 48 (2.7%) non-Swiss women. Of the population in the municipality 701 or about 44.3% were born in Ried-Brig and lived there in 2000. There were 578 or 36.5% who were born in the same canton, while 192 or 12.1% were born somewhere else in Switzerland, and 87 or 5.5% were born outside of Switzerland. The age distribution of the population (as of 2000) is children and teenagers (0–19 years old) make up 29.2% of the population, while adults (20–64 years old) make up 61.1% and seniors (over 64 years old) make up 9.7%.

As of 2000, there were 707 people who were single and never married in the municipality. There were 778 married individuals, 63 widows or widowers and 34 individuals who are divorced.

As of 2000, there were 562 private households in the municipality, and an average of 2.7 persons per household. There were 121 households that consist of only one person and 64 households with five or more people. Out of a total of 568 households that answered this question, 21.3% were households made up of just one person and there were 7 adults who lived with their parents. Of the rest of the households, there are 147 married couples without children, 254 married couples with children There were 29 single parents with a child or children. There were 4 households that were made up of unrelated people and 6 households that were made up of some sort of institution or another collective housing.

In 2000 there were 294 single family homes (or 67.0% of the total) out of a total of 439 inhabited buildings. There were 114 multi-family buildings (26.0%), along with 12 multi-purpose buildings that were mostly used for housing (2.7%) and 19 other use buildings (commercial or industrial) that also had some housing (4.3%).

In 2000, a total of 538 apartments (78.2% of the total) were permanently occupied, while 136 apartments (19.8%) were seasonally occupied and 14 apartments (2.0%) were empty. As of 2009, the construction rate of new housing units was 12.5 new units per 1000 residents. The vacancy rate for the municipality, in 2010, was 1.67%.

The historical population is given in the following chart:

== Politics ==
In the 2007 federal election the most popular party was the CVP which received 65.45% of the vote. The next three most popular parties were the SP (14.89%), the SVP (13.08%) and the FDP (4.1%). In the federal election, a total of 911 votes were cast, and the voter turnout was 65.3%.

In the 2009 Conseil d'État/Staatsrat election a total of 887 votes were cast, of which 49 or about 5.5% were invalid. The voter participation was 65.3%, which is much more than the cantonal average of 54.67%. In the 2007 Swiss Council of States election a total of 909 votes were cast, of which 25 or about 2.8% were invalid. The voter participation was 65.5%, which is much more than the cantonal average of 59.88%.

== Economy ==
As of 2010, Ried-Brig had an unemployment rate of 1.3%. As of 2008, there were 73 people employed in the primary economic sector and about 34 businesses involved in this sector. 79 people were employed in the secondary sector and there were 18 businesses in this sector. 158 people were employed in the tertiary sector, with 43 businesses in this sector. There were 746 residents of the municipality who were employed in some capacity, of which females made up 36.6% of the workforce.

In 2008 the total number of full-time equivalent jobs was 234. The number of jobs in the primary sector was 40, of which 29 were in agriculture and 11 were in forestry or lumber production. The number of jobs in the secondary sector was 70 of which 21 or (30.0%) were in manufacturing and 49 (70.0%) were in construction. The number of jobs in the tertiary sector was 124. In the tertiary sector; 15 or 12.1% were in wholesale or retail sales or the repair of motor vehicles, 13 or 10.5% were in the movement and storage of goods, 30 or 24.2% were in a hotel or restaurant, 1 was in the information industry, 4 or 3.2% were the insurance or financial industry, 3 or 2.4% were technical professionals or scientists, 7 or 5.6% were in education and 38 or 30.6% were in health care.

In 2000, there were 75 workers who commuted into the municipality and 598 workers who commuted away. The municipality is a net exporter of workers, with about 8.0 workers leaving the municipality for every one entering. About 5.3% of the workforce coming into Ried-Brig are coming from outside Switzerland. Of the working population, 25.3% used public transportation to get to work, and 59.1% used a private car.

== Religion ==
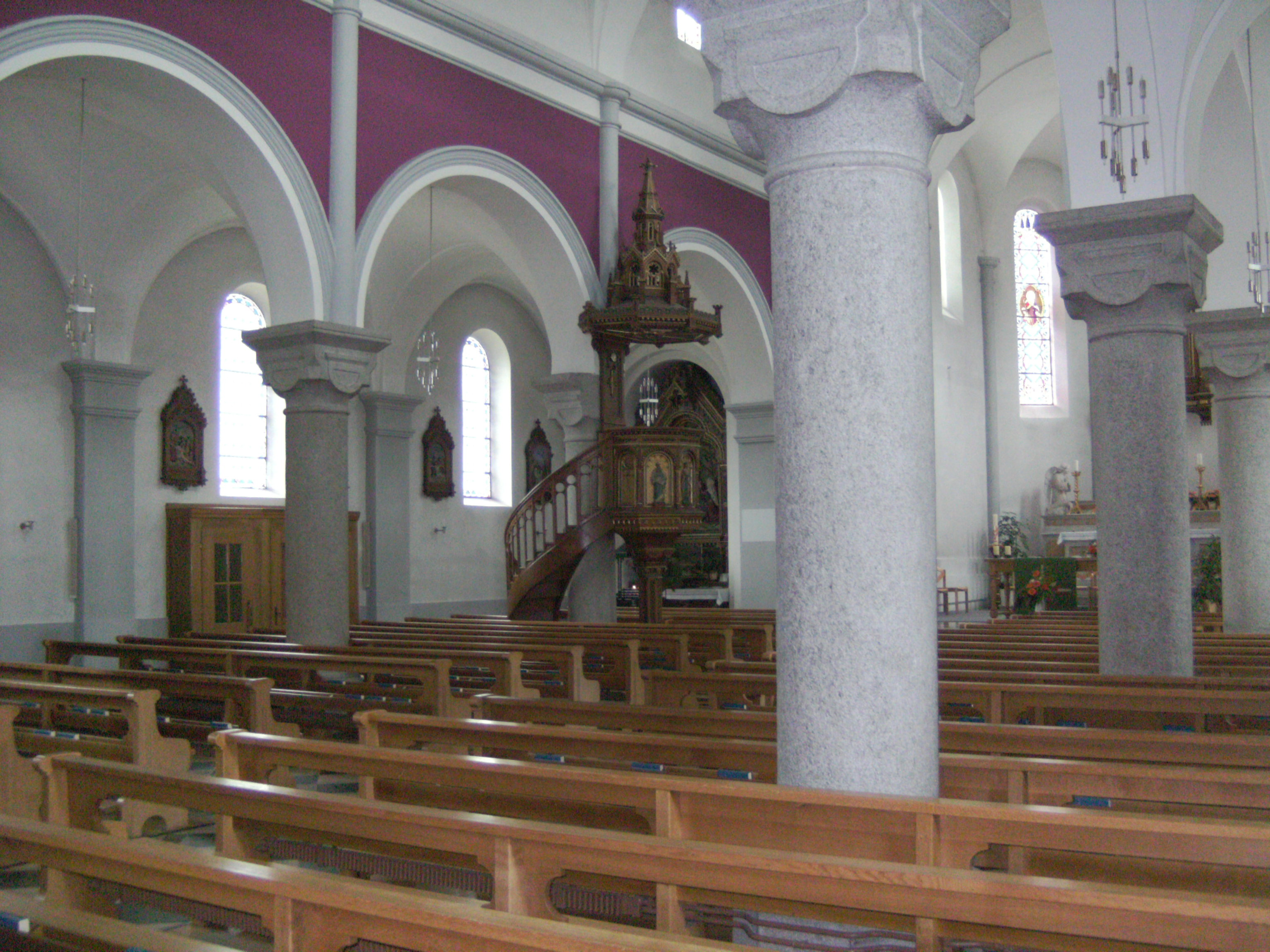
Interior of Church of St. Rita in Ried-Brig

From the 2000 census, 1,391 or 87.9% were Roman Catholic, while 85 or 5.4% belonged to the Swiss Reformed Church. Of the rest of the population, there were 6 members of an Orthodox church (or about 0.38% of the population), and there were 27 individuals (or about 1.71% of the population) who belonged to another Christian church. There were 7 (or about 0.44% of the population) who were Islamic. There was 1 person who was Buddhist. 44 (or about 2.78% of the population) belonged to no church, are agnostic or atheist, and 34 individuals (or about 2.15% of the population) did not answer the question.

== Education ==
In Ried-Brig about 631 or (39.9%) of the population have completed non-mandatory upper secondary education, and 165 or (10.4%) have completed additional higher education (either university or a Fachhochschule). Of the 165 who completed tertiary schooling, 72.1% were Swiss men, 18.2% were Swiss women, 5.5% were non-Swiss men and 4.2% were non-Swiss women.

During the 2010–2011 school year there were a total of 155 students in the Ried-Brig school system. The education system in the Canton of Valais allows young children to attend one year of non-obligatory Kindergarten. During that school year, there 2 kindergarten classes (KG1 or KG2) and 37 kindergarten students. The canton's school system requires students to attend six years of primary school. In Ried-Brig there were a total of 8 classes and 155 students in the primary school. The secondary school program consists of three lower, obligatory years of schooling (orientation classes), followed by three to five years of optional, advanced schools. All the lower secondary students from Ried-Brig attend their school in a neighboring municipality. All the upper secondary students attended school in another municipality.

As of 2000, there were 8 students in Ried-Brig who came from another municipality, while 149 residents attended schools outside the municipality.
