= List of mayors of Naters =

Coat of arms of Naters

This is a list of mayors of Naters, Switzerland. The executive of Naters is the Gemeinderat. It is chaired by the Gemeindepräsident.

Mayor (Gemeindepräsident) of Naters
Term	Mayor	Lifespan	Party	Notes
1852–1854	Anton Salzmann	(1804–1868)		
1855–1860	Ignaz Schmid	(1805–1885)		
1861–1862	Anton Eggel	(1826–1909)		
1863–1864	Ignaz Salzmann	(1828–1885)		
1865–1868	Ignaz Schmid	(1805–1885)		
1869–1870	Johann Eyer	(1821–1895)		
1871–1876	Anton Eggel	(1826–1909)		
1877–1880	Alphons Wyssen	(1826–1905)		
1881–1892	Ludwig Salzmann	(1851–1914)		
1893–1896	Emanuel Ruppen	(1862–1940)		
1897–1902	Ludwig Salzmann	(1851–1914)		
1903–1904	Karl Klingele	(1861–1920)		
1905–1916	Meinrad Michlig	(1877–1938)		
1917–1923	Anton Salzmann	(1879–1959)	KVP	
1923–1933	Alfred Gertschen	(1875–1933)	KVP	
1933–1940	Alois Gertschen	(1896–1984)	KVP	
1941–1964	Meinrad Michlig	(1906–1968)	KVP	
1965–1976	Paul Biderbost	(1927–1999)	KVP/CVP	
1977–1985	Richard Gertschen	(1936–2004)	CVP	
1985–1994	Richard Walker	(1939–1994)	CVP	
1994–2004	Edith Nanzer-Hutter	(born 1947)	CVP	
2005–present	Manfred Holzer	(born 1961)	CVP	
