= Birgisch =

- Former municipality
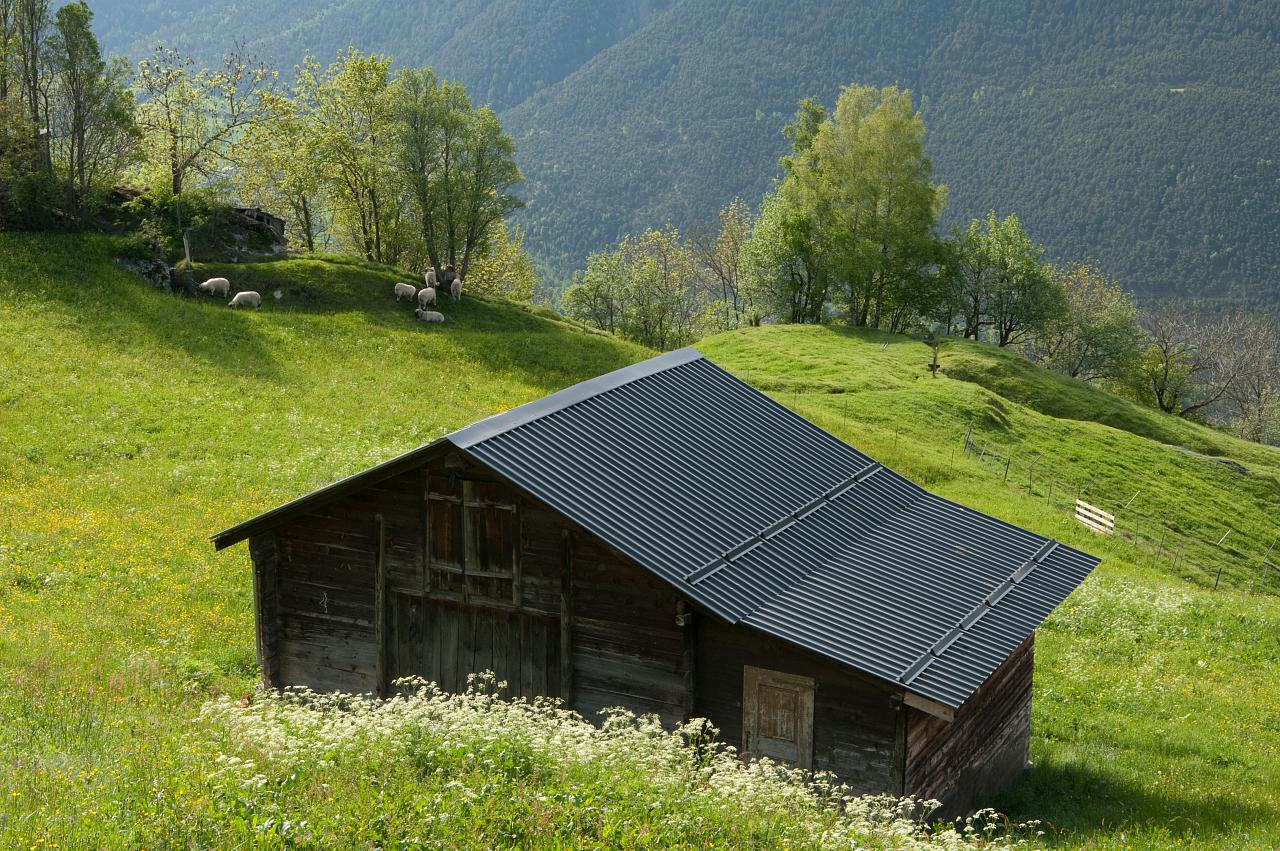
- A farm house near Birgisch village

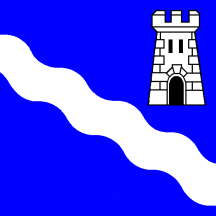
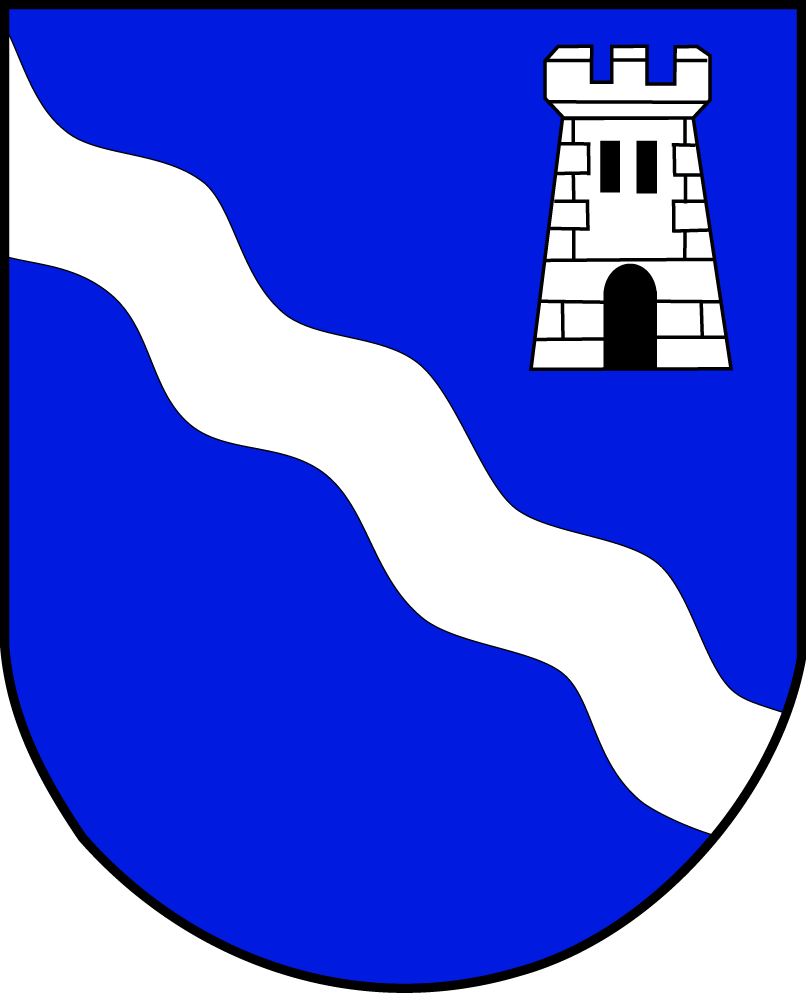
- Flag Coat of arms
- Location of Birgisch
- Location within Switzerland Location within Canton of Valais
- Coordinates: 46°19′N 7°57′E
- Country: Switzerland
- Canton: Valais
- District: Brig

Government
  - Mayor: Lothar Schwestermann

Area
  - Total: 5.7 km^{2} (2.2 sq mi)
- Elevation: 1,093 m (3,586 ft)

Population (2010)
  - Total: 241
  - Density: 42/km^{2} (110/sq mi)
- Time zone: UTC+01:00 (CET)
  - Summer (DST): UTC+02:00 (CEST)
- Postal code: 3903
- SFOS number: 6001
- ISO 3166 code: CH-VS
- Surrounded by: Naters
- Website: birgisch.ch

Birgisch (Swiss Standard German pronunciation: [ˈbɪrɡɪʃ]) is a former municipality in the district of Brig in the canton of Valais in Switzerland. On 1 January 2013 the former municipalities of Birgisch and Mund merged into the municipality of Naters.

== History ==
Birgisch is first mentioned in 1232 as Burginse.

== Geography ==
Before the merger, Birgisch had a total area of 5.7 km^{2} (2.2 mi^{2}). The area is divided as follows: 37.9% is used for agricultural purposes, while 46.5% is forested. Of the rest of the land, 3.0% is settled (buildings or roads) and 12.6% is unproductive land.

The former municipality is located above the right bank of the Rhone river. It consists of the village of Birgisch and numerous hamlets.

== Coat of arms ==
The blazon of the municipal coat of arms is Azure, a bend lowered wavy Argent, in chief sinister a Tower of the same lined, doored and windowed Sable.

== Demographics ==
Birgisch had a population (as of 2010) of 241. As of 2008, 4.1% of the population are resident foreign nationals. Over the last 10 years (1999–2009 ) the population has changed at a rate of 0%. It has changed at a rate of -1.8% due to migration and at a rate of 1.8% due to births and deaths.

Most of the population (as of 2000) speaks German (207 or 95.4%) as their first language, Slovenian is the second most common language (4 or 1.8%) and French is the third (2 or 0.9%).

As of 2008, the gender distribution of the population was 50.9% male and 49.1% female. The population was made up of 107 Swiss men (48.6% of the population) and 5 (2.3%) non-Swiss men. There were 105 Swiss women (47.7%) and 3 (1.4%) non-Swiss women. Of the population in the municipality 110 or about 50.7% were born in Birgisch and lived there in 2000. There were 65 or 30.0% who were born in the same canton, while 27 or 12.4% were born somewhere else in Switzerland, and 13 or 6.0% were born outside of Switzerland. The age distribution of the population (as of 2000) is children and teenagers (0–19 years old) making up 24% of the population, while adults (20–64 years old) making up 59% and seniors (over 64 years old) making up 17.1%.

As of 2000, there were 88 people who were single and never married in the municipality. There were 113 married individuals, 14 widows or widowers and 2 individuals who are divorced.

As of 2000, there were 84 private households in the municipality, and an average of 2.5 persons per household. There were 23 households that consist of only one person and 6 households with five or more people. Out of a total of 85 households that answered this question, 27.1% were households made up of just one person and there was 1 adult who lived with their parents. Of the rest of the households, there are 22 married couples without children, 34 married couples with children There were 3 single parents with a child or children. There was 1 household that was made up of unrelated people and 1 household that was made up of some sort of institution or another collective housing.

In 2000 there were 91 single family homes (or 72.2% of the total) out of a total of 126 inhabited buildings. There were 26 multi-family buildings (20.6%), along with 7 multi-purpose buildings that were mostly used for housing (5.6%) and 2 other use buildings (commercial or industrial) that also had some housing (1.6%).

In 2000, a total of 80 apartments (51.9% of the total) were permanently occupied, while 58 apartments (37.7%) were seasonally occupied and 16 apartments (10.4%) were empty. As of 2009, the construction rate of new housing units was 9.1 new units per 1000 residents. The vacancy rate for the municipality, in 2010, was 2.41%.

The historical population is given in the following chart:

== Politics ==
In the 2007 federal election the most popular party was the CVP which received 56.68% of the vote. The next three most popular parties were the SVP (21.93%), the SP (13.35%) and the Green Party (2.72%). In the federal election, a total of 114 votes were cast, and the voter turnout was 63.0%.

In the 2009 Conseil d'État/Staatsrat election a total of 95 votes were cast, of which 9 or about 9.5% were invalid. The voter participation was 53.7%, which is similar to the cantonal average of 54.67%. In the 2007 Swiss Council of States election a total of 114 votes were cast, of which 12 or about 10.5% were invalid. The voter participation was 64.0%, which is similar to the cantonal average of 59.88%.

== Economy ==
As of 2010, Birgisch had an unemployment rate of 0.7%. As of 2008, there were 23 people employed in the primary economic sector and about 12 businesses involved in this sector. 4 people were employed in the secondary sector and there were 2 businesses in this sector. 8 people were employed in the tertiary sector, with 3 businesses in this sector. There were 98 residents of the municipality who were employed in some capacity, of which females made up 36.7% of the workforce.

In 2008 the total number of full-time equivalent jobs was 17. The number of jobs in the primary sector was 8, all of which were in agriculture. The number of jobs in the secondary sector was 3 of which 1 was in manufacturing and 2 (66.7%) were in construction. The number of jobs in the tertiary sector was 6. In the tertiary sector; 1 was in the sale or repair of motor vehicles, 2 or 33.3% were in a hotel or restaurant, 2 or 33.3% were in education.

In 2000, there were 6 workers who commuted into the municipality and 84 workers who commuted away. The municipality is a net exporter of workers, with about 14.0 workers leaving the municipality for every one entering. Of the working population, 19.4% used public transportation to get to work, and 74.5% used a private car.

== Religion ==
From the 2000 census, 203 or 93.5% were Roman Catholic, while 9 or 4.1% belonged to the Swiss Reformed Church. 2 (or about 0.92% of the population) belonged to no church, are agnostic or atheist, and 3 individuals (or about 1.38% of the population) did not answer the question.

== Education ==
In Birgisch about 83 or (38.2%) of the population have completed non-mandatory upper secondary education, and 10 or (4.6%) have completed additional higher education (either university or a Fachhochschule). Of the 10 who completed tertiary schooling, 60.0% were Swiss men, 30.0% were Swiss women.

During the 2010-2011 school year there were a total of 13 students in the Birgisch school system. The education system in the Canton of Valais allows young children to attend one year of non-obligatory Kindergarten. During that school year, there were no kindergarten classes (KG1 or KG2) and there were no kindergarten students. The canton's school system requires students to attend six years of primary school. In Birgisch there was one class and 13 students in the primary school. The secondary school program consists of three lower, obligatory years of schooling (orientation classes), followed by three to five years of optional, advanced schools. All the lower secondary students from Birgisch attend their school in a neighboring municipality. All the upper secondary students attended school in another municipality.

As of 2000, there were 10 students from Birgisch who attended schools outside the municipality.
