= Bisse d'Ayent =

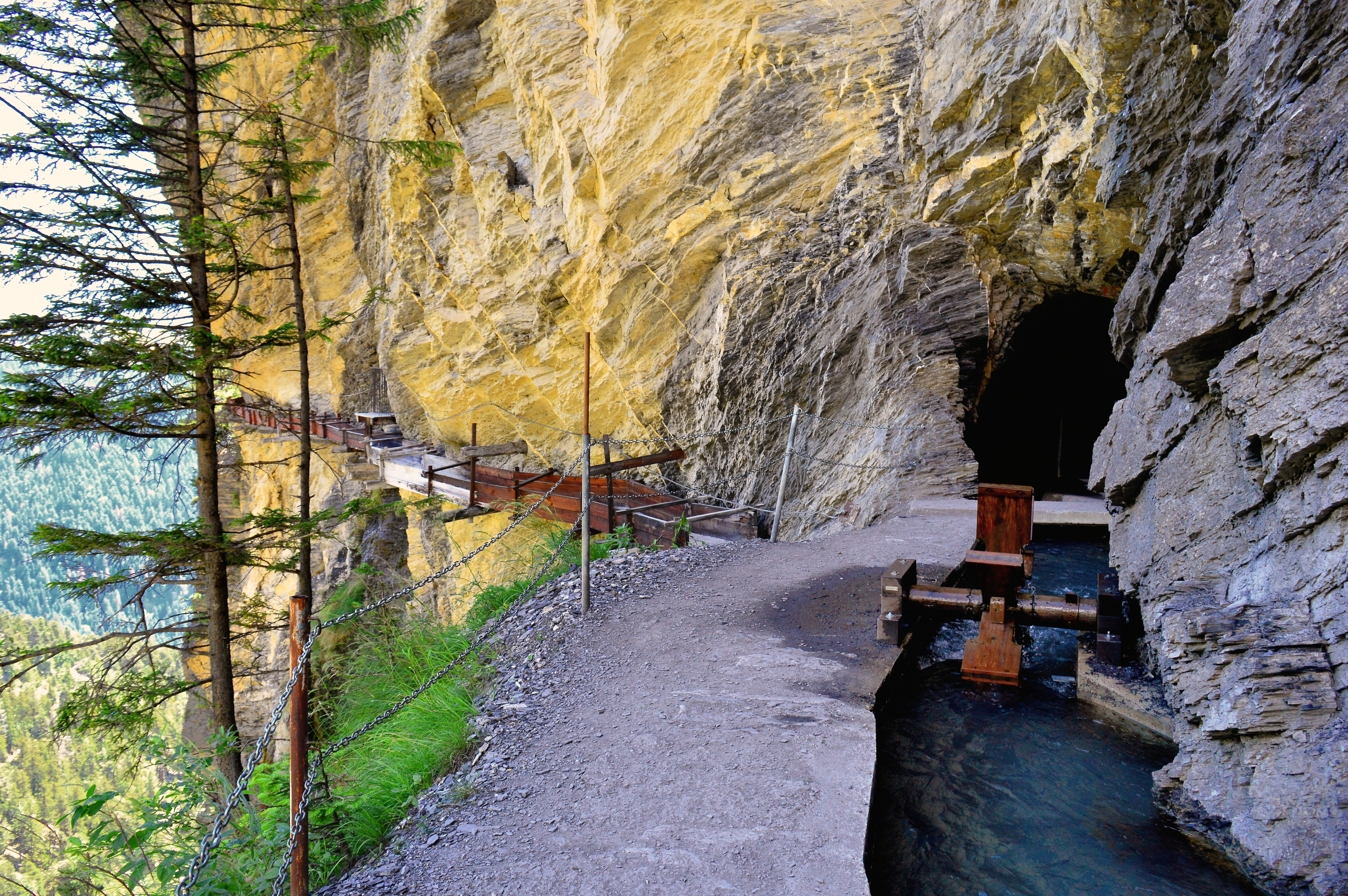
Bisse d'Ayent before Torrent-Croix with the hammer

The Bisse d'Ayent is a bisse (traditional irrigation channel) in Valais. It takes its source at the Tseuzier reservoir and irrigates vineyards and meadows in the municipalities of Ayent and Grimisuat.

The Bisse d'Ayent is located on the heights of Sion in one of the driest regions of Switzerland. Built in 1442, it takes its water directly from the Liène river, below the Tseuzier dam (1777 m above sea level). The latter is fed by the water from the Wildhorn, including a small glacier on its summit. The bisse is in water from June to October.

The first part of the bisse is quite spectacular as it passes through the middle of a cliff (Torrent-Croix). At the time, the bisse passed through wooden canals fixed to the vertical wall, several hundred meters above the ground. This part was abandoned in 1831 following the digging of a tunnel and was restored (but not put back into service) in 1991. Near the entrance of the tunnel is a hammer which allowed the watchman of the bisse to know if the watercourse continued to flow normally. A path follows the bisse all along; it was historically used to watch the bisse to ensure the flow of water and today allows hikers all the way. Today the bisse is filled with water for about two thirds of the way.

In 2019, the Swiss National Bank (SNB) unveiled the design of the new series, whose banknote of 100 francs represents on its back the passage of Torrent-Croix of the Bisse d'Ayent.

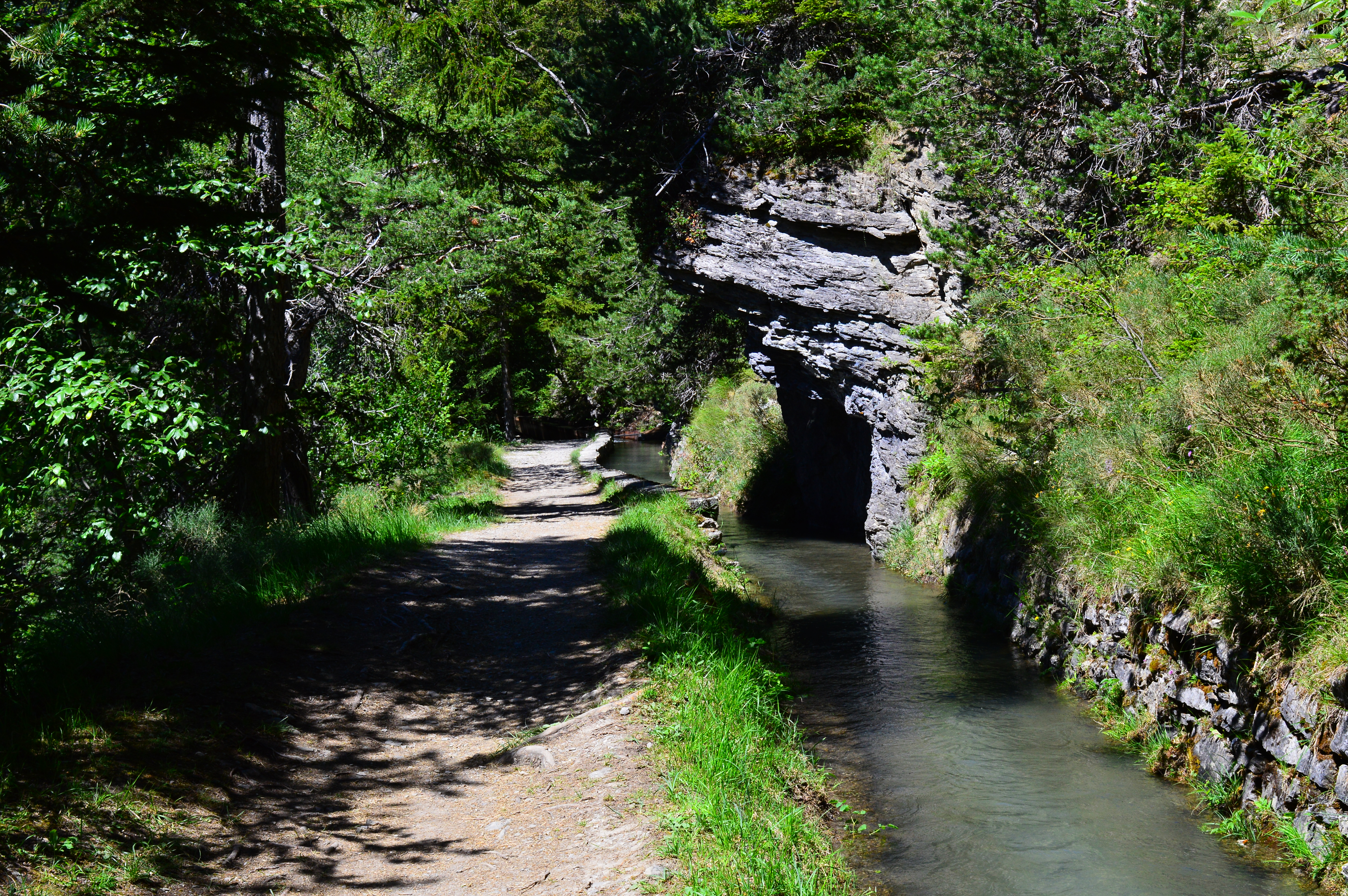
Wooded section

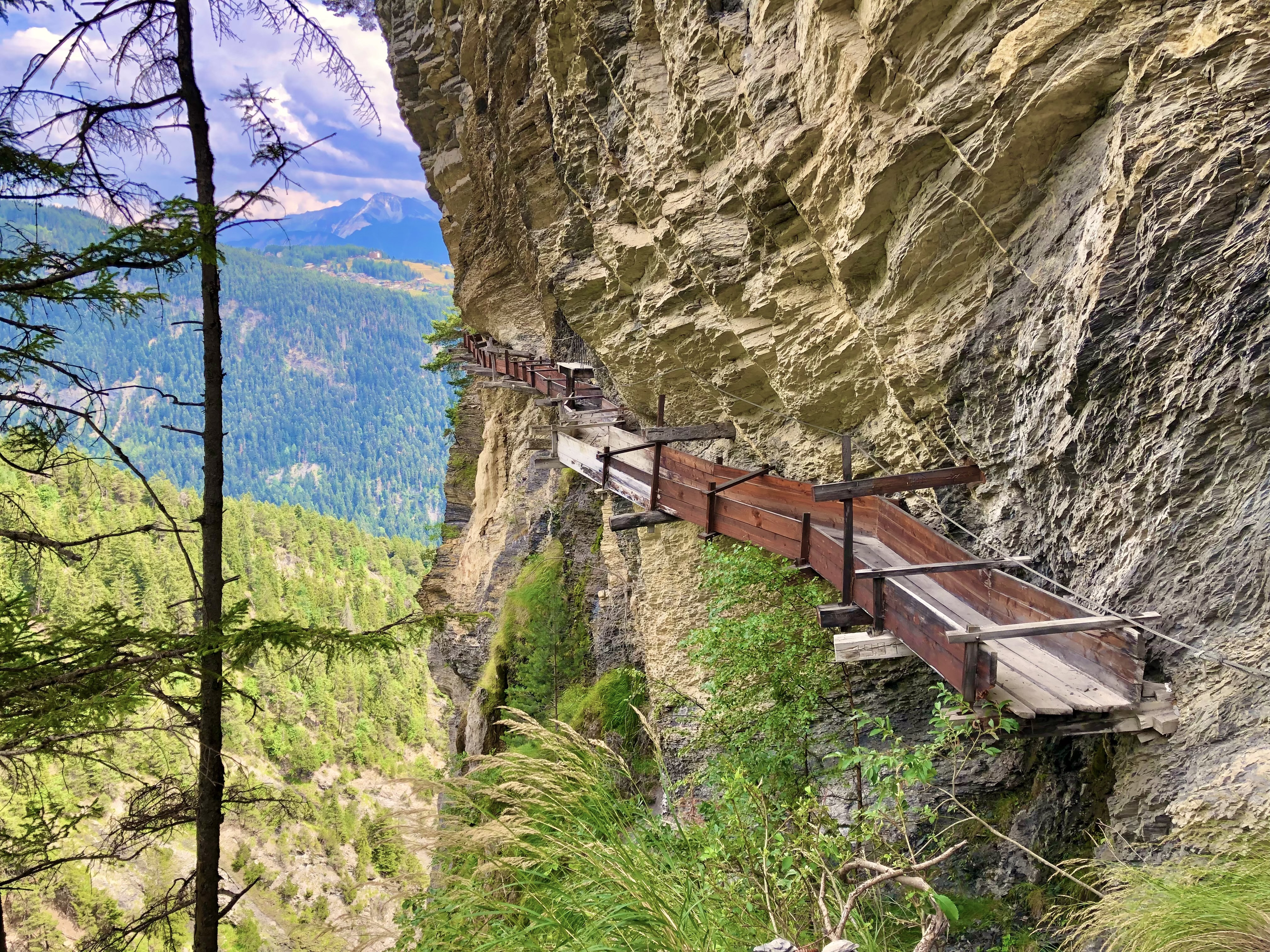
Disused Torrent-Croix section

== See also ==
- Agriculture in Switzerland § Irrigation
