= Lac d'Icogne =

- Location within Canton of Valais Location within Switzerland Location within Alps
- Interactive map of Lac d'Icogne
- Location: Valais
- Coordinates: 46°18′18.73″N 7°27′22.22″E
- Type: reservoir
- Catchment area: 3.3 km^{2} (1.3 sq mi)
- Basin countries: Switzerland
- Surface area: 7 ha (17 acres)
- Water volume: 0.04 million cubic metres (32 acre⋅ft)
- Surface elevation: 1,416 m (4,646 ft)

Lac d'Icogne is a reservoir in the municipality of Lens near the village of Crans-sur-Sierre in the canton of Valais, Switzerland. The lake has a volume of 0.04 million m³ and a surface area of 7 ha (17 acres).

== History ==
The reservoir was built in 1963 in order to improve the use of the irrigation water coming from Mont-Lachaux.

In 2006, the municipality of Icogne started a Micro hydro project using the overflow of the lake in order to produce electricity. Even if the municipality of Icogne was the owner of the lake and the water, the project was delayed by negotiations with the neighboring municipality of Lens on which the lake is located. The hydro-power plant was inaugurated in May 2012.
