= Arbaaz =

Arbaaz is a given name. Notable people with the name include:

- Arbaaz Khan (born 1967), Indian actor, director, and film producer
- Arbaaz Mir, character from Assassin's Creed Chronicles: India

== See also ==
- Arbaz, municipality in Switzerland
