= Tibor Varga (violinist) =

Hungarian violinist (1921–2003)

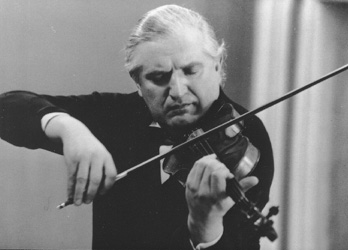
- Born: 4 July 1921; Győr, Hungary
- Died: 4 September 2003 (aged 82); Grimisuat, Switzerland
- Occupations: Classical violinist; Conductor; Academic teacher
- Organization: Musikhochschule Detmold
- Website: www.tiborvarga.ch

Tibor Varga (4 July 1921 – 4 September 2003) was a Hungarian violinist, conductor, and music teacher who developed pedagogic methods for teaching string music. He was a founding member of the string department in the Musikhochschule Detmold.

== Early life ==
Varga was born in Győr in the same region that witnessed the birth of Joseph Joachim, Leopold Auer, Carl Flesch as well as of the famous conductor Hans Richter. Young Varga took his first lessons at the age of two and a half with his father Lajos Varga, who was also a violinist. Due to an injury during the War, Lajos Varga had to abandon his plans to be a concert artist and became a violin maker.

== Studies ==
Coming to the attention of Jenő Hubay, Varga was enrolled at the Budapest Franz Liszt Academy when only ten years old, where he studied, among others, with Zoltán Kodály and Leó Weiner. After Hubay's death (1937), Varga was chosen to be the soloist in the memorial concert, playing the Hubay's Third Violin Concerto, Op. 99, conducted by Ernő Dohnányi, who in 1934 had succeeded as the Rector of the Liszt Academy. On completion of his musical studies at the Liszt Music Academy, Varga devoted himself throughout the war years to studying philosophy at the Budapest University.

== Career ==
Varga was six years old when he made his first public appearance. At ten, he took on his first solo role with an orchestra, performing Mendelssohn's Violin Concerto. At the age of 13, he made his first recordings. At 14, he took on his first concert tours abroad, until his career had abruptly been interrupted by World War II. After the War he continued his concert activities, becoming one of the most prominent soloists. Varga collaborated with eminent conductors such as Ernest Ansermet, Leonard Bernstein, Pierre Boulez, Wilhelm Furtwängler, Igor Markevitch, Hans Rosbaud, Georg Solti and others. He performed with the greatest orchestras such as the Philharmonia Orchestra and the Berlin Philharmonic Orchestra and recorded for labels such as Deutsche Grammophon and EMI. A recording of Bartók's Violin Concerto No. 2 with the Berlin Philharmonic Orchestra under Ferenc Fricsay as well as his versions of the violin concertos by Max Bruch, Mozart, Carl Nielsen, Paganini, Tchaikovsky and others have become major references of musical interpretation.

Varga's classical repertory included the great violin concertos as well as important violin sonatas and concert pieces. In addition, from the beginning of his career, Tibor Varga devoted himself to contemporary music, of which he became a pioneer. In particular, his interpretations including premieres and recordings of the violin concertos and other compositions by Béla Bartók, Alban Berg and Arnold Schoenberg have raised these works to the status of classics of the repertoire and given them a prime position in international musical life. Among others, Varga played the Australian premiere of Berg's Violin Concerto and in 1949, of Schoenberg's Violin Concerto. Schoenberg paid tribute to his enthusiasm by a letter which has become famous: "I wished to be younger to write more music of this kind for you." (Schoenberg, Letters). The Schoenberg Violin Concerto, like the Violin Concertos by Berg, Shostakovich and other works, were also interpreted by Tibor Varga at the BBC Promenade Concerts in the London Royal Albert Hall. Furthermore, he gave the Austrian premiere of Stravinsky's Violin Concerto as well as the world premieres of numerous compositions partly also dedicated to him, such as the Violin Concertos by Boris Blacher, Ernst Krenek, Gösta Nystroem, Almeida Prado, Matyas Seiber and Winfried Zillig.

From the beginning of the 1950s, Varga enjoyed equal success as a conductor. His conducting career led to the establishment, in 1954, of a chamber orchestra bearing his name (Kammerorchester Tibor Varga) at Detmold, as well as to that of the Tibor Varga Festival Orchestra (1964–2001) at Sion. He was chief conductor and artistic director of these ensembles as well as – from 1989 to 1993 – of the Orchestre des Pays de Savoie. In addition, Varga had regularly been invited as a guest conductor to orchestras of international renown.

== Pedagogic activities ==
After World War II, Varga in his home town Győr was co-founder and first professor of a Music Academy associated to the Budapest Franz Liszt Academy. In 1947, he established himself in London. In 1949, he became professor at the newly founded Hochschule für Musik Detmold. Charged to establish the string department, for which he was asked to become the head, Varga, with cellist André Navarra and violists Bruno Giuranna and Nobuko Imai, created a string school of world renown. Since the 1950s, Varga has equally been jury member or president in the leading international violin and chamber music competitions. Regularly he also directed master classes at the Internationale Ferienkurse für Neue Musik in Darmstadt, London, Paris, Salzburg's Mozarteum, Siena's Accademia Chigiana and other musical centres in Europe and the US, also giving public lectures on musical themes.

In 1956, Varga settled in Switzerland, though maintaining his position in Detmold. In 1963, at Sion, the capital of the Canton of Valais in Switzerland, he created an Académie de Musique Tibor Varga, specializing in interpretation classes for accomplished young players conducted by leading soloists during the summer. In a typical year, the International Academy draws around 400 students to attend about 25 master classes. In 1964, he founded the Festival Tibor Varga (1964–2001), which during nearly four decades was one of the leading international music festivals with concerts broadcast all over the world. In addition, in 1967, he added the annual International Tibor Varga Violin Competition, one of the most prestigious competitions of its genre, including prize-winners like Jean-Jacques Kantorow, Nam Yun Kim, Mirijam Contzen and Vadim Repin.

In 1988, the Ecole Supérieure de Musique, exclusively dedicated to the training of professional string players, was founded at Sion, with Varga responsible as both artistic and teaching director. Within one year of the founding of the school, a leading music educator proclaimed the Varga school as "one of the three best professional violin academies in Europe", with highly gifted students of all continents. In 2002, the École Supérieure de Musique became the Conservatoire Supérieur et Académie de Musique Tibor Varga. Today, it is part of the Lausanne High School of Music (HEMU Lausanne-Fribourg-Sion). In addition, Varga was an artistic and pedagogic adviser in the services of the ministries of culture in France and Portugal. Since October 2002, he held a chair for violin at the University of Music and Performing Arts, Graz.

Graduates of Varga's school are soloists, concertmasters, professors and members of leading orchestras all over the world, including the Berlin Philharmonic, Orchestra del Teatro alla Scala, Symphonieorchester des Bayerischen Rundfunks, Staatskapelle Dresden, Deutsches Symphonie-Orchester Berlin, New Japan Philharmonic and others. Madeleine Carruzzo, Varga's student for many years, was the first female member to be admitted to the Berlin Philharmonic.

== Distinctions ==
Varga was an honorary citizen of different towns in France and in Switzerland. France, Germany, Hungary and Switzerland have awarded him high honours, among others the National Prize for Culture (Switzerland), the Cross of Merit (Germany), the Cross of Merit (Hungary), the medals of the Arts et Lettres and of France's Legion of Honour. The Budapest University respectively the Budapest Franz Liszt Academy appointed him honorary professor, a rare distinction awarded, for example, to Edward Elgar, Emil Gilels, Richard Strauss and Arturo Toscanini. Varga's Etude-Caprice for 4 violins composed on the occasion of the European Rector's Conference in Graz, Cultural Capital of Europe, in 2003 has been designated after his death to be the official hymn of the European University Association.

== Death ==
Varga died at his home in Grimisuat, near Sion, Switzerland, on 4 September 2003. With his first wife Judith, he had a son, Gilbert Varga, a noted conductor. His daughter Susan Rybicki-Varga is a cellist and teacher. His second wife Dr. Angelika Varga-Behrer is a musicologist, musician and author. Sole responsible administrator of Tibor Varga´s artistic legacy, Angelika Varga-Behrer is also the editor of Tibor Varga´s Violin Method (also in transcription for viola) as well as the author of his official biography.

== See also ==
- Legion of Honour
- List of Legion of Honour recipients by name (V)
- Legion of Honour Museum

== Additional Sources ==
- J. Creighton, Discopaedia of the Violin, 1889–1971, Toronto 1974
- S. Applebaum and H. Roth, The Way They Play, Book 10, Neptune/N.J. 1981
- W. Kiley, Ventures abroad, in: The Strad, Febr. 1987
- R. Noltensmeier, Geiger von Beruf, Kiel 1999
- T. Potter, A Fiery Philosopher, in: The Strad, April 2000
- N. Hornig, Spiegel des Lebens, in: FonoForum, Sept. 2001
