= Yves Allegro =

Swiss tennis player (born 1978)

- Country (sports): Switzerland
- Residence: Grône, Switzerland
- Born: 24 August 1978 (age 48) Grône, Switzerland
- Height: 1.83 m (6 ft 0 in)
- Turned pro: 1997
- Retired: 2011
- Plays: Right-handed
- Prize money: US$768,327

Singles
- Career record: 5–10
- Career titles: 0
- Highest ranking: No. 210 (16 June 2003)

Doubles
- Career record: 121–157
- Career titles: 3
- Highest ranking: No. 32 (4 October 2004)

Grand Slam doubles results
- Australian Open: 3R (2003)
- French Open: 3R (2004, 2006)
- Wimbledon: 2R (2006)
- US Open: 2R (2003, 2004, 2005, 2006, 2007, 2008)

Yves Allegro (born 24 August 1978) is a retired Swiss professional tennis player. He is a doubles specialist and is well known as compatriot Roger Federer's doubles partner and friend. Allegro and Federer teamed up in doubles at the Australian Open in 2003 and 2004.

He played the Davis Cup for Switzerland from 2004 to 2010 alongside Roger Federer or Stan Wawrinka.

On 9 December 2019 at a hearing at the District Court of Sierra, Allegro received a two-year suspended sentence for sexual coercion. The offence occurred in October 2014 while in Tallinn, Estonia towards an ex-Austrian player. Allegro appealed the verdict, but Federal Supreme Court of Switzerland confirmed the decision.

== Tournament Director ==
In 2020, Allegro founded an ITF M25 tennis tournament that initially took place in Sierre, Valais, now in Sion. Rinky Hijikata won the 2021 edition. Remy Bertola of Switzerland won the 2022 and the 2023 edition. The 2024 edition takes place in August 2024.

== ATP career finals ==
=== Doubles: 10 (3–7) ===
Legend
Grand Slam (0-0)
ATP World Tour Finals (0-0)
ATP World Tour Masters 1000 (0-0)
ATP World Tour 500 (1-1)
ATP World Tour 250 (2-6)

Result	W/L	Date	Tournament	Surface	Partner	Opponents	Score
Win	1–0	Oct 2003	Vienna, Austria	Hard (i)	(Switzerland) Roger Federer	(India) Mahesh Bhupathi (Belarus) Max Mirnyi	7–6^{(9–7)}, 7–5
Loss	1–1	Oct 2004	Bangkok, Thailand	Hard (i)	(Switzerland) Roger Federer	(United States) Justin Gimelstob (United States) Graydon Oliver	7–5, 4–6, 4–6
Loss	1–2	Aug 2004	Long Island, United States	Hard	(Germany) Michael Kohlmann	(France) Antony Dupuis (France) Michaël Llodra	2–6, 4–6
Loss	1–3	May 2004	Casablanca, Morocco	Clay	(Germany) Michael Kohlmann	(Italy) Enzo Artoni (Spain) Fernando Vicente	6–3, 0–6, 4–6
Win	2–3	Jan 2005	Auckland, New Zealand	Hard	(Germany) Michael Kohlmann	(Sweden) Simon Aspelin (Australia) Todd Perry	6–4, 7–6^{(7–4)}
Loss	2–4	Feb 2005	San Jose, United States	Hard (i)	(Germany) Michael Kohlmann	(Australia) Wayne Arthurs (Australia) Paul Hanley	6–7^{(4–7)}, 4–6
Win	3–4	Jun 2005	Halle, Germany	Grass	(Switzerland) Roger Federer	(Sweden) Joachim Johansson (Russia) Marat Safin	7–5, 6–7^{(6–8)}, 6–3
Loss	3–5	Jul 2006	Stuttgart, Germany	Clay	(Sweden) Robert Lindstedt	(Argentina) Gastón Gaudio (Belarus) Max Mirnyi	5–7, 7–6, [10–12]
Loss	3–6	Apr 2007	Valencia, Spain	Clay	(Argentina) Sebastián Prieto	(South Africa) Wesley Moodie (Australia) Todd Perry	5–7, 5–7
Loss	3–7	Feb 2008	Marseille, France	Hard (i)	(South Africa) Jeff Coetzee	(Czech Republic) Martin Damm (Czech Republic) Pavel Vízner	6–7^{(7–9)}, 5–7
