= Sion District =

Coordinates: 46°14′00″N 7°20′57″E

Sion District de Sion
- District
- Flag Coat of arms
- Country: Switzerland
- Canton: Valais
- Capital: Sion

Area
  - Total: 125.6 km^{2} (48.5 sq mi)

Population (2020)
  - Total: 48,447
  - Density: 385.7/km^{2} (999.0/sq mi)
- Time zone: UTC+1 (CET)
  - Summer (DST): UTC+2 (CEST)
- Municipalities: 5

The district of Sion is a district of the canton of Valais in Switzerland. It has a population of 48,447 (as of 31 December 2020).

== Municipalities ==
It comprises the following municipalities:

Municipality	Population (31 December 2020)	Area km^{2}
Arbaz	1,360	19.29
Grimisuat	3,584	4.44
Savièse	7,937	70.92
Sion	34,978	34.86
Veysonnaz	588	1.1
Total	48,447	125.51

== Coat of arms ==
The blazon of the district coat of arms is Per pale Argent two Mullets of Five Gules, and Gules.

== Demographics ==
Sion has a population (as of December 2020) of 48,447. Most of the population (as of 2000) speaks French (31,488 or 85.1%) as their first language, German is the second most common (1,878 or 5.1%) and Portuguese is the third (1,029 or 2.8%). There are 915 people who speak Italian and 20 people who speak Romansh.

As of 2008, the gender distribution of the population was 48.3% male and 51.7% female. The population comprised 15,250 Swiss men (36.8% of the population) and 4,787 (11.5%) non-Swiss men. There were 16,910 Swiss women (40.8%) and 4,537 (10.9%) non-Swiss women. Of the population in the district 14,700 or about 39.7% were born in Sion and lived there in 2000. There were 9,873 or 26.7% who were born in the same canton, while 3,986 or 10.8% were born somewhere else in Switzerland, and 7,258, or 19.6% were born outside of Switzerland.

As of 2000, 15,728 people were single and never married in the district. There were 17,375 married individuals, 2,099 widows or widowers and 1,791 individuals who are divorced.

4,974 households consist of only one person and 967 households with five or more people. Out of a total of 15,344 households that answered this question, 32.4% were households made up of just one person and 146 adults lived with their parents. Of the rest of the households, there are 3,694 married couples without children, 4,762 married couples with children There were 1,065 single parents with a child or children. 245 households were made up of unrelated people and 458 households that were made up of some sort of institution or another collective housing.

The historical population is given in the following chart:

== Mergers and name changes ==
- On 17 November 1962, Bramois merged into the municipality of Sion.
- On 1 January 2013 the former municipality of Salins merged into the municipality of Sion.
- On 1 January 2017 the former municipality of Les Agettes merged into the municipality of Sion.

== Politics ==
In the 2007 federal election, the most popular party was the CVP which received 37.31% of the vote. The next three most popular parties were the SP (18.59%), the SVP (15.81%) and the FDP (13.65%). In the federal election, a total of 15,459 votes were cast, and the voter turnout was 59.9%.

In the 2009 Conseil d'État/Staatsrat election, a total of 13,603 votes were cast, of which 1,334 or about 9.8% were invalid. The voter participation was 52.7%, which is similar to the cantonal average of 54.67%. In the 2007 Swiss Council of States election a total of 15,234 votes were cast, of which 1,196 or about 7.9% were invalid. The voter participation was 60.0%, which is similar to the cantonal average of 59.88%.

== Religion ==
From the 2000 census, 29,644 or 80.1% were Roman Catholic, while 1,708 or 4.6% belonged to the Swiss Reformed Church. Of the rest of the population, there were 241 members of an Orthodox church (or about 0.65% of the population), there were 22 individuals (or about 0.06% of the population) who belonged to the Christian Catholic Church, and there were 629 individuals (or about 1.70% of the population) who belonged to another Christian church. There were 16 individuals (or about 0.04% of the population) who were Jewish, and 1,429 (or about 3.86% of the population) who were Muslims. There were 93 individuals who were Buddhist, 52 individuals who were Hindu and 25 individuals who belonged to another church. 1,704 (or about 4.61% of the population) belonged to no church, are agnostic or atheist, and 1,735 individuals (or about 4.69% of the population) did not answer the question.

== Weather ==
Sion town has an average of 82.6 days of rain or snow per year and on average receives 598 mm (23.5 in) of precipitation. The wettest month is December during which time Sion receives an average of 61 mm (2.4 in) of rain or snow. During this month there is precipitation for an average of 7.4 days. The month with the most days of precipitation is August, with an average of 8.2, but with only 55 mm (2.2 in) of rain or snow. The driest month of the year is April with an average of 36 mm (1.4 in) of precipitation over 5.9 days.

== Education ==
In Sion about 11,917 or (32.2%) of the population have completed non-mandatory upper secondary education, and 4,922 or (13.3%) have completed additional higher education (either University or a Fachhochschule). Of the 4,922 who completed tertiary schooling, 56.8% were Swiss men, 30.7% were Swiss women, 7.0% were non-Swiss men and 5.6% were non-Swiss women.
