= Saint-Léonard, Switzerland =

Saint-Léonard
- Municipality

- Flag Coat of arms
- Location of Saint-Léonard
- Location within Switzerland Location within Canton of Valais
- Coordinates: 46°15′N 7°25′E
- Country: Switzerland
- Canton: Valais
- District: Sierre

Area
  - Total: 3.9 km^{2} (1.5 sq mi)
- Elevation: 498 m (1,634 ft)

Population (December 2002)
  - Total: 1,922
  - Density: 490/km^{2} (1,300/sq mi)
- Time zone: UTC+01:00 (CET)
  - Summer (DST): UTC+02:00 (CEST)
- Postal code: 1958
- SFOS number: 6246
- ISO 3166 code: CH-VS
- Surrounded by: Ayent, Grône, Icogne, Lens, Sierre, Sion
- Website: www.st-leonard.ch

Saint-Léonard is a municipality in the district of Sierre in the canton of Valais in Switzerland. The Saint-Léonard underground lake situated there is a tourist attraction.

== History ==
Saint-Léonard is first mentioned in 1218 as apud Sanctum Leonardum. The municipality was formerly known by its German name St. Leonhard, however, that name is no longer used.

== Geography ==
Saint-Léonard has an area, as of 2009, of 3.9 square kilometers (1.5 mi^{2}). Of this area, 1.83 km^{2} (0.71 mi^{2}) or 46.9% is used for agricultural purposes, while 0.6 km^{2} (0.23 mi^{2}) or 15.4% is forested. Of the rest of the land, 1.11 km^{2} (0.43 mi^{2}) or 28.5% is settled (buildings or roads), 0.15 km^{2} (37 acres) or 3.8% is either rivers or lakes and 0.17 km^{2} (0.066 mi^{2}) or 4.4% is unproductive land.

Of the built up area, housing and buildings made up 9.7% and transportation infrastructure made up 13.1%. Power and water infrastructure as well as other special developed areas made up 3.3% of the area while parks, green belts and sports fields made up 1.8%. Out of the forested land, 13.8% of the total land area is heavily forested and 1.5% is covered with orchards or small clusters of trees. Of the agricultural land, 5.6% is used for growing crops and 4.6% is pastures, while 36.7% is used for orchards or vine crops. All the water in the municipality is flowing water. Of the unproductive areas, 2.8% is unproductive vegetation and 1.5% is too rocky for vegetation.

The municipality is located in the Sierre district. The original haufendorf village (an irregular, unplanned and quite closely packed village, built around a central square) was located on the left side of the Lienne and along the right side of the Rhone valley. By the middle of the 20th Century, it had spread out into the valley floor.

== Coat of arms ==
The blazon of the municipal coat of arms is Azure, issuant from Coupeaux Vert a Pine tree of the same trunked proper between in chief two Mullets of Five Or.

== Demographics ==
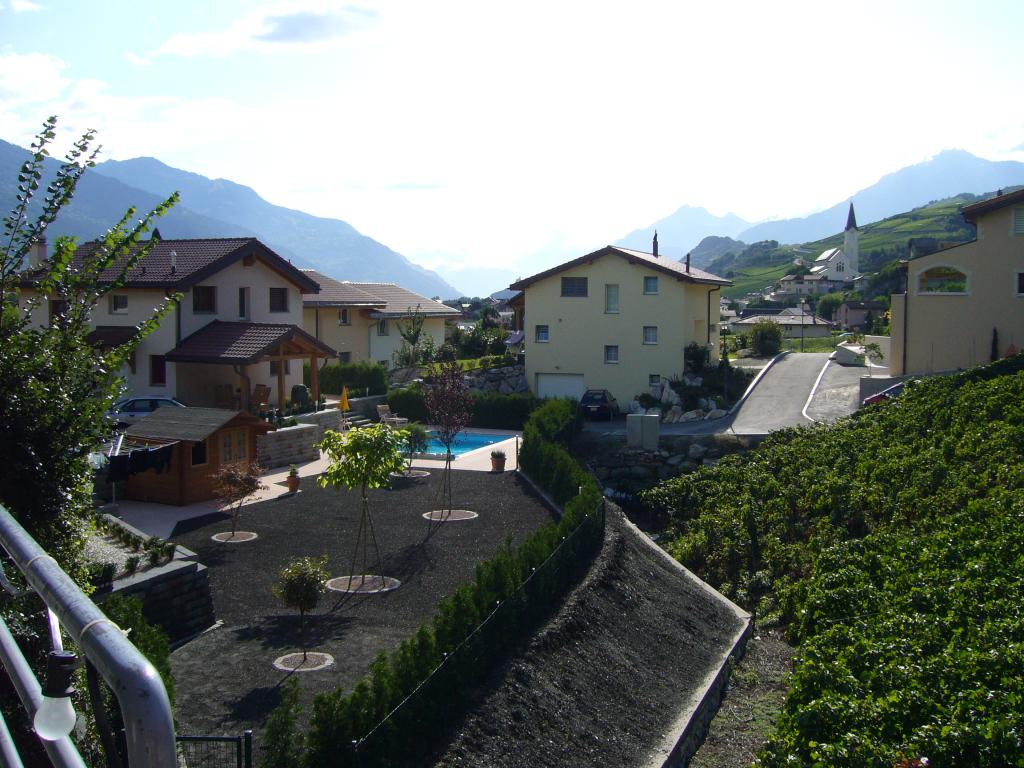
Saint-Léonard village

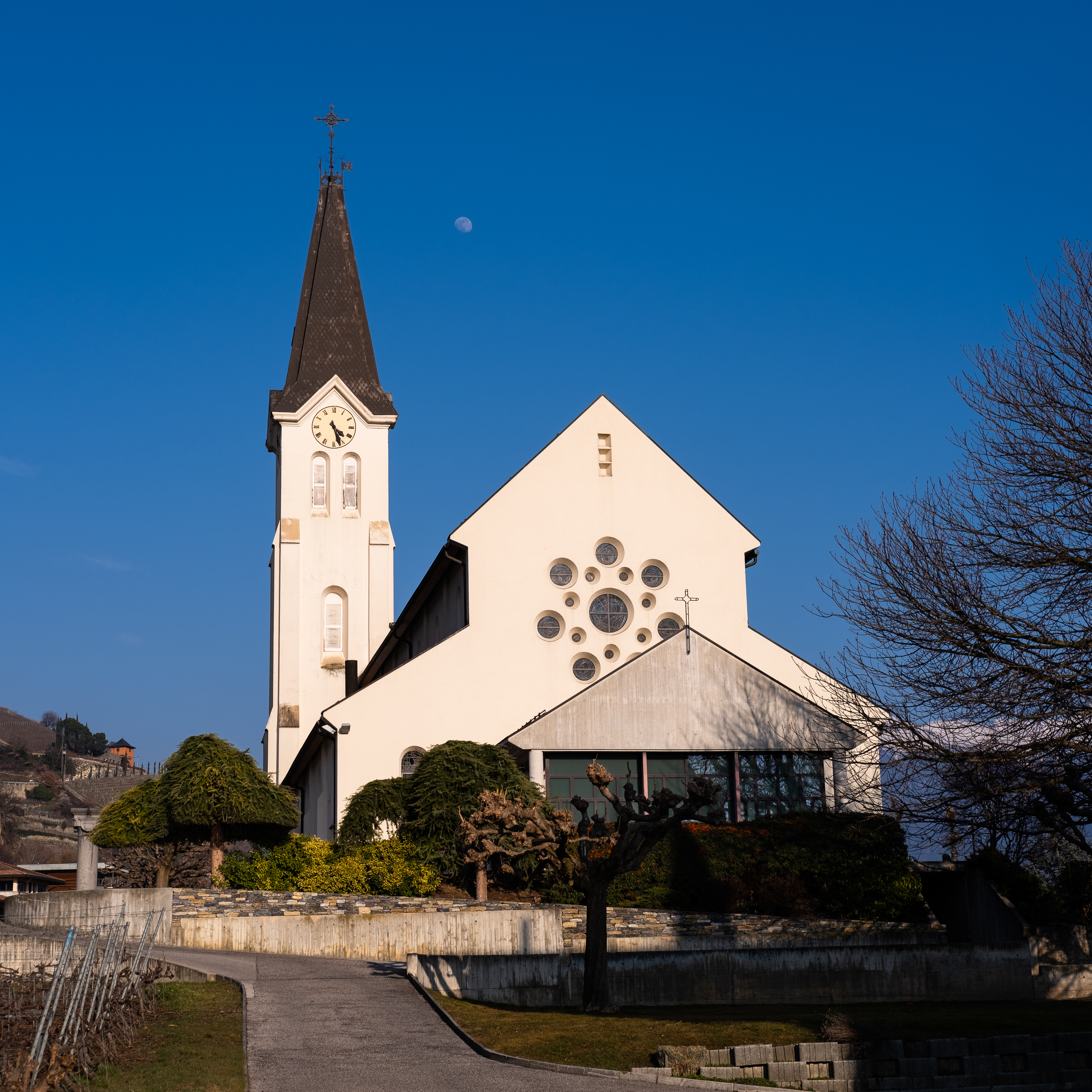
Church and Saint-Léonard village

Saint-Léonard has a population (as of December 2020) of 2,460. As of 2008, 13.6% of the population are resident foreign nationals. Over the last 10 years (2000–2010 ) the population has changed at a rate of 10.7%. It has changed at a rate of 8% due to migration and at a rate of 2.7% due to births and deaths.

Most of the population (as of 2000) speaks French (1,741 or 93.0%) as their first language, German is the second most common (53 or 2.8%) and Portuguese is the third (38 or 2.0%). There are 20 people who speak Italian and 1 person who speaks Romansh.

As of 2008, the population was 48.7% male and 51.3% female. The population was made up of 864 Swiss men (41.3% of the population) and 155 (7.4%) non-Swiss men. There were 912 Swiss women (43.6%) and 163 (7.8%) non-Swiss women. Of the population in the municipality, 987 or about 52.7% were born in Saint-Léonard and lived there in 2000. There were 531 or 28.4% who were born in the same canton, while 117 or 6.3% were born somewhere else in Switzerland, and 191 or 10.2% were born outside of Switzerland.

As of 2000, children and teenagers (0–19 years old) make up 24.5% of the population, while adults (20–64 years old) make up 60.5% and seniors (over 64 years old) make up 15%.

As of 2000, there were 718 people who were single and never married in the municipality. There were 973 married individuals, 103 widows or widowers and 78 individuals who are divorced.

As of 2000, there were 712 private households in the municipality, and an average of 2.5 persons per household. There were 169 households that consist of only one person and 54 households with five or more people. In 2000, a total of 680 apartments (91.9% of the total) were permanently occupied, while 51 apartments (6.9%) were seasonally occupied and 9 apartments (1.2%) were empty. As of 2009, the construction rate of new housing units was 2.9 new units per 1000 residents. The vacancy rate for the municipality, in 2010, was 0.61%.

The historical population is given in the following chart:

== Heritage sites of national significance ==
The Neolithic rock carving at Crête Des Barmes is listed as a Swiss heritage site of national significance.

== Sights ==
Château Sonvillaz was rebuilt and restored in 1562–1565. It is currently owned by the Hefti-Rossier family.

== Politics ==
In the 2007 federal election the most popular party was the CVP which received 36.76% of the vote. The next three most popular parties were the FDP (31.46%), the SP (15.06%) and the SVP (9.58%). In the federal election, a total of 1,053 votes were cast, and the voter turnout was 72.6%.

== Economy ==
As of 2010, Saint-Léonard had an unemployment rate of 3.6%. As of 2008, there were 69 people employed in the primary economic sector and about 22 businesses involved in this sector. 94 people were employed in the secondary sector and there were 15 businesses in this sector. 287 people were employed in the tertiary sector, with 46 businesses in this sector. There were 892 residents of the municipality who were employed in some capacity, of which females made up 40.5% of the workforce.

In 2008 the total number of full-time equivalent jobs was 355. The number of jobs in the primary sector was 40, all of which were in agriculture. The number of jobs in the secondary sector was 87 of which 20 or (23.0%) were in manufacturing, 21 or (24.1%) were in mining and 45 (51.7%) were in construction. The number of jobs in the tertiary sector was 228. In the tertiary sector; 67 or 29.4% were in wholesale or retail sales or the repair of motor vehicles, 16 or 7.0% were in the movement and storage of goods, 39 or 17.1% were in a hotel or restaurant, 10 or 4.4% were in the information industry, 11 or 4.8% were the insurance or financial industry, 8 or 3.5% were technical professionals or scientists, 3 or 1.3% were in education and 54 or 23.7% were in health care.

In 2000, there were 223 workers who commuted into the municipality and 656 workers who commuted away. The municipality is a net exporter of workers, with about 2.9 workers leaving the municipality for every one entering. Of the working population, 7.6% used public transportation to get to work, and 74.1% used a private car.

== Religion ==
From the 2000 census, 1,688 or 90.2% were Roman Catholic, while 46 or 2.5% belonged to the Swiss Reformed Church. Of the rest of the population, there were 11 individuals (or about 0.59% of the population) who belonged to the Christian Catholic Church, and there were 20 individuals (or about 1.07% of the population) who belonged to another Christian church. There was 1 individual who was Jewish, and 18 (or about 0.96% of the population) who were Islamic. There were 2 individuals who were Buddhist. 31 (or about 1.66% of the population) belonged to no church, are agnostic or atheist, and 64 individuals (or about 3.42% of the population) did not answer the question.

== Education ==
In Saint-Léonard about 645 or (34.5%) of the population have completed non-mandatory upper secondary education, and 178 or (9.5%) have completed additional higher education (either university or a Fachhochschule). Of the 178 who completed tertiary schooling, 65.2% were Swiss men, 27.5% were Swiss women, 3.4% were non-Swiss men and 3.9% were non-Swiss women.

As of 2000, there were 18 students in Saint-Léonard who came from another municipality, while 131 residents attended schools outside the municipality.
