= Savièse =

- Municipality
- Flag Coat of arms
- Location of Savièse
- Location within Switzerland Location within Canton of Valais
- Coordinates: 46°15′N 7°20′E
- Country: Switzerland
- Canton: Valais
- District: Sion

Government
  - Mayor: Sylvain Dumoulin

Area
  - Total: 70.9 km^{2} (27.4 sq mi)
- Elevation: 820 m (2,690 ft)

Population (December 2002)
  - Total: 5,534
  - Density: 78.1/km^{2} (202/sq mi)
- Time zone: UTC+01:00 (CET)
  - Summer (DST): UTC+02:00 (CEST)
- Postal code: 1965
- SFOS number: 6265
- ISO 3166 code: CH-VS
- Surrounded by: Arbaz, Ayent, Conthey, Grimisuat, Gsteig bei Gstaad (BE), Lauenen (BE), Ormont-Dessus (VD), Sion
- Twin towns: Vaux-le-Pénil (France)
- Website: www.saviese.ch

Savièse is a municipality in the district of Sion in the canton of Valais in Switzerland.

== History ==
Savièse is first mentioned in 1200 as Saviesi. In 1224 it was mentioned as Savisia. The municipality was formerly known by its German name Safiesch, however, that name is no longer used.

== Geography ==
Savièse has an area, as of 2009, of 70.9 square kilometers (27.4 mi^{2}). Of this area, 15.05 km^{2} (5.81 mi^{2}) or 21.2% is used for agricultural purposes, while 11.24 km^{2} (4.34 mi^{2}) or 15.8% is forested. Of the rest of the land, 3.36 km^{2} (1.30 mi^{2}) or 4.7% is settled (buildings or roads), 0.83 km^{2} (0.32 mi^{2}) or 1.2% is either rivers or lakes and 40.53 km^{2} (15.65 mi^{2}) or 57.1% is unproductive land.

Of the built up area, housing and buildings made up 2.9% and transportation infrastructure made up 1.4%. Out of the forested land, 12.5% of the total land area is heavily forested and 2.9% is covered with orchards or small clusters of trees. Of the agricultural land, 3.8% is pastures, while 4.7% is used for orchards or vine crops and 12.7% is used for alpine pastures. Of the water in the municipality, 0.6% is in lakes and 0.6% is in rivers and streams. Of the unproductive areas, 9.8% is unproductive vegetation, 42.8% is too rocky for vegetation and 4.6% of the land is covered by glaciers.

The municipality is located in the Sion district, on the right side of the Rhone. This large municipality, which covers over half of the total area of the district, is bordered in the north by the Bernese Alps and is connected to the Saanenland by the Sanetsch Pass. It consists of the six villages of Saint-Germain (the capital of the municipality), Chandolin, Granois, Drône, Roumaz and Ormone as well as multiple hamlets.

== Coat of arms ==
The blazon of the municipal coat of arms is Gules, a Sword Argent hilted Or.

== Demographics ==
Savièse has a population (as of December 2020) of 7,937. As of 2008, 10.1% of the population are resident foreign nationals. Over the last 10 years (2000–2010 ) the population has changed at a rate of 18.1%. It has changed at a rate of 14.4% due to migration and at a rate of 3.6% due to births and deaths.

Most of the population (as of 2000) speaks French (5,013 or 93.9%) as their first language, German is the second most common (188 or 3.5%) and Portuguese is the third (54 or 1.0%). There are 25 people who speak Italian and 1 person who speaks Romansh.

As of 2008, the population was 48.8% male and 51.2% female. The population was made up of 2,743 Swiss men (43.1% of the population) and 363 (5.7%) non-Swiss men. There were 2,907 Swiss women (45.7%) and 352 (5.5%) non-Swiss women. Of the population in the municipality, 3,142 or about 58.8% were born in Savièse and lived there in 2000. There were 1,027 or 19.2% who were born in the same canton, while 527 or 9.9% were born somewhere else in Switzerland, and 466 or 8.7% were born outside of Switzerland.

As of 2000, children and teenagers (0–19 years old) make up 22.8% of the population, while adults (20–64 years old) make up 62.4% and seniors (over 64 years old) make up 14.8%.

As of 2000, there were 2,097 people who were single and never married in the municipality. There were 2,738 married individuals, 344 widows or widowers and 162 individuals who are divorced.

As of 2000, there were 1,878 private households in the municipality, and an average of 2.5 persons per household. There were 458 households that consist of only one person and 123 households with five or more people. In 2000, a total of 1,839 apartments (93.2% of the total) were permanently occupied, while 114 apartments (5.8%) were seasonally occupied and 21 apartments (1.1%) were empty. As of 2009, the construction rate of new housing units was 2 new units per 1000 residents. The vacancy rate for the municipality, in 2010, was 0.53%.

The historical population is given in the following chart:

== Politics ==
In the 2007 federal election the most popular party was the CVP which received 36.95% of the vote. The next three most popular parties were the SP (18.65%), the SVP (18.52%) and the FDP (15.48%). In the federal election, a total of 3,041 votes were cast, and the voter turnout was 68.4%.

In the 2009 Conseil d'État/Staatsrat election a total of 2,743 votes were cast, of which 240 or about 8.7% were invalid. The voter participation was 60.6%, which is much more than the cantonal average of 54.67%. In the 2007 Swiss Council of States election a total of 3,015 votes were cast, of which 196 or about 6.5% were invalid. The voter participation was 68.5%, which is much more than the cantonal average of 59.88%.

== Economy ==
As of 2010, Savièse had an unemployment rate of 3.2%. As of 2008, there were 340 people employed in the primary economic sector and about 194 businesses involved in this sector. 366 people were employed in the secondary sector and there were 54 businesses in this sector. 616 people were employed in the tertiary sector, with 128 businesses in this sector. There were 2,655 residents of the municipality who were employed in some capacity, of which females made up 42.6% of the workforce.

In 2008 the total number of full-time equivalent jobs was 980. The number of jobs in the primary sector was 203, all of which were in agriculture. The number of jobs in the secondary sector was 339 of which 165 or (48.7%) were in manufacturing and 174 (51.3%) were in construction. The number of jobs in the tertiary sector was 438. In the tertiary sector; 92 or 21.0% were in wholesale or retail sales or the repair of motor vehicles, 25 or 5.7% were in the movement and storage of goods, 48 or 11.0% were in a hotel or restaurant, 1 was in the information industry, 9 or 2.1% were the insurance or financial industry, 28 or 6.4% were technical professionals or scientists, 42 or 9.6% were in education and 87 or 19.9% were in health care.

In 2000, there were 193 workers who commuted into the municipality and 1,854 workers who commuted away. The municipality is a net exporter of workers, with about 9.6 workers leaving the municipality for every one entering. Of the working population, 8.4% used public transportation to get to work, and 78.2% used a private car.

== Religion ==
From the 2000 census, 4,616 or 86.4% were Roman Catholic, while 250 or 4.7% belonged to the Swiss Reformed Church. Of the rest of the population, there were 17 members of an Orthodox church (or about 0.32% of the population), and there were 109 individuals (or about 2.04% of the population) who belonged to another Christian church. There were 29 (or about 0.54% of the population) who were Islamic. There were 5 individuals who were Buddhist and 1 individual who belonged to another church. 154 (or about 2.88% of the population) belonged to no church, are agnostic or atheist, and 212 individuals (or about 3.97% of the population) did not answer the question.

== Education ==
In Savièse about 1,814 or (34.0%) of the population have completed non-mandatory upper secondary education, and 664 or (12.4%) have completed additional higher education (either university or a Fachhochschule). Of the 664 who completed tertiary schooling, 63.6% were Swiss men, 27.1% were Swiss women, 3.9% were non-Swiss men and 5.4% were non-Swiss women.

As of 2000, there were 10 students in Savièse who came from another municipality, while 233 residents attended schools outside the municipality.

Savièse is home to the Bibliothèque communale library. The library has (as of 2008) 9,854 books or other media, and loaned out 20,754 items in the same year. It was open a total of 300 days with average of 14 hours per week during that year.

== Cultural Heritage ==
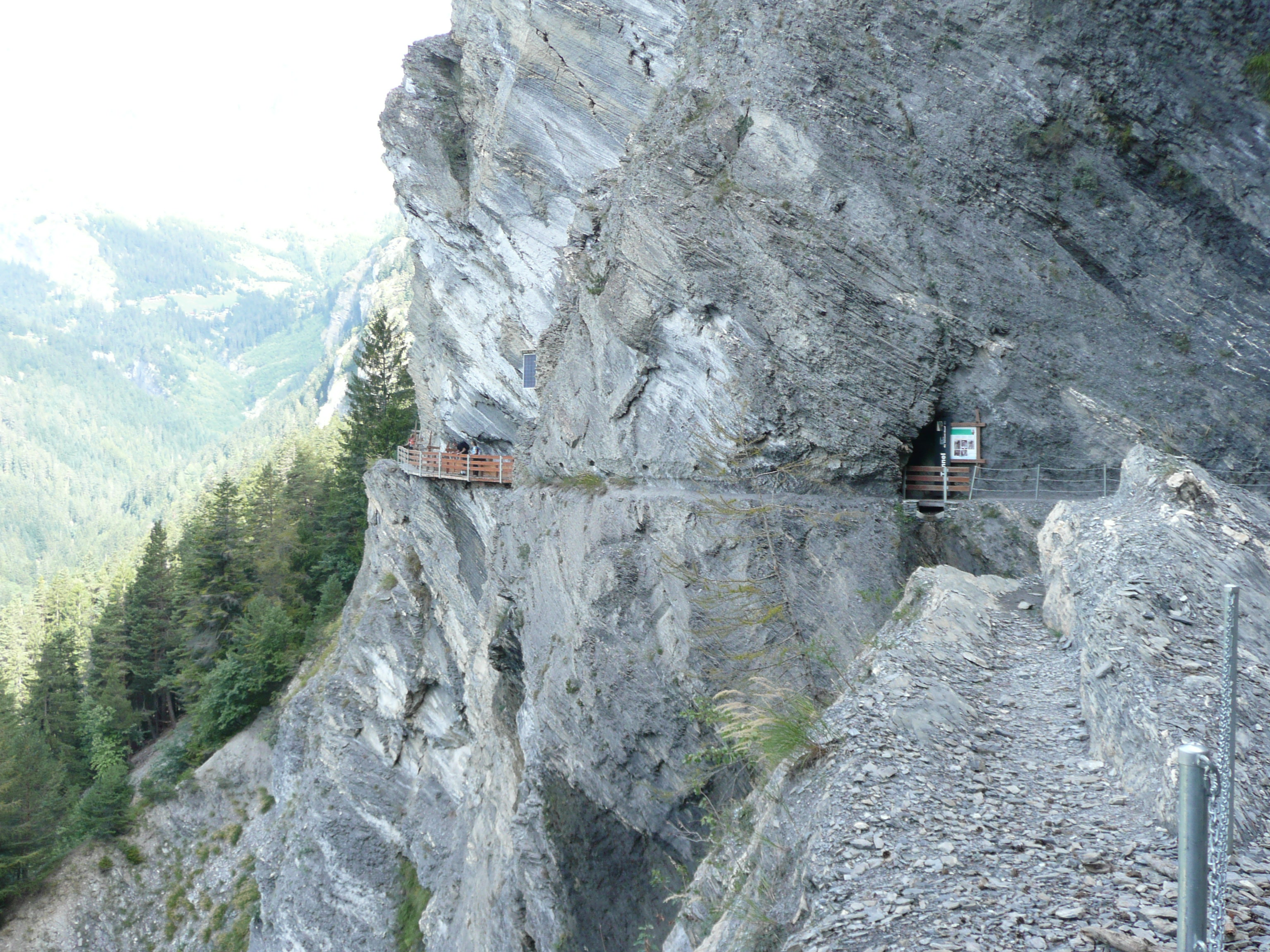
Bisse de Savièse

Build since 1430, the Torrent-Neuf is a canal pound located in Savièse. After successive renovations, it was closed and was no longer in use since 1934. In 2005, it was renovated by the municipality and the Association pour la sauvegarde du Torrent-Neuf and since then has become one of the most visited tourist attraction of Savièse.

Soie Castle is a ruined castle located in Savièse that was constructed during the 13th century and destroyed during the Raron affair.
