= Mirijam Contzen =

German-Japanese violinist (born 1976)

Mirijam Contzen (born in 1976) is a German-Japanese violinist.

== Life and career ==
Born in Münster, Contzen grew up in Lünen. She began her studies at the Musikhochschule Detmold in 1984 and from 1988 she was a master student of the violin teacher Tibor Varga (1921–2003) from Hungary. Since 2005 she has been artistic director of the annual International Chamber Music Festival Schloss Cappenberg, which takes place every summer at Cappenberg Castle. The 11th concert took place from 20 to 27 May 2018. Among other musicians were Herbert Schuch (piano), Tobias Bredohl (piano) and Sebastian Manz (clarinet).
