= Salins, Switzerland =

Salins
- Former municipality
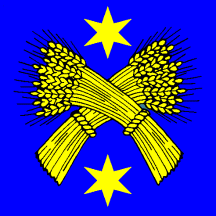
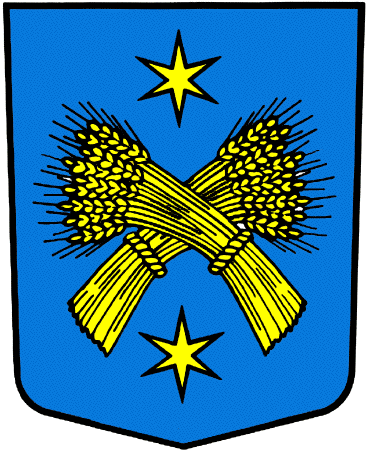
- Flag Coat of arms
- Location of Salins
- Location within Switzerland Location within Canton of Valais
- Coordinates: 46°13′N 7°22′E
- Country: Switzerland
- Canton: Valais
- District: Sion

Government
  - Mayor: Nicolas Rossier

Area
  - Total: 4.1 km^{2} (1.6 sq mi)
- Elevation: 842 m (2,762 ft)

Population (2010)
  - Total: 982
  - Density: 240/km^{2} (620/sq mi)
- Time zone: UTC+01:00 (CET)
  - Summer (DST): UTC+02:00 (CEST)
- Postal code: 1991
- SFOS number: 6264
- ISO 3166 code: CH-VS
- Surrounded by: Les Agettes, Nendaz, Sion, Veysonnaz
- Website: www.salins.ch

Salins (French pronunciation: [salɛ̃]) was a municipality in the district of Sion in the canton of Valais in Switzerland. On 1 January 2013 the former municipality of Salins merged into the municipality of Sion.

== History ==
Salins is first mentioned in 1200 as Salaig. In 1227 it was mentioned as Salen. The municipality was formerly known by its German name Schalein, however, that name is no longer used.

== Geography ==
Before the merger, Salins had a total area of 4.1 km^{2} (1.6 mi^{2}). Of this area, 1.35 km^{2} (0.52 mi^{2}) or 32.6% is used for agricultural purposes, while 2.12 km^{2} (0.82 mi^{2}) or 51.2% is forested. Of the rest of the land, 0.61 km^{2} (0.24 mi^{2}) or 14.7% is settled (buildings or roads) and 0.03 km^{2} (7.4 acres) or 0.7% is unproductive land.

Of the built up area, housing and buildings made up 8.5% and transportation infrastructure made up 4.8%. Out of the forested land, 43.7% of the total land area is heavily forested and 7.5% is covered with orchards or small clusters of trees. Of the agricultural land, 0.0% is used for growing crops and 12.3% is pastures, while 17.1% is used for orchards or vine crops and 3.1% is used for alpine pastures.

The former municipality is located in the Sion district, on the left bank of the Rhone river. It consists of the village of Salins-Village and several hamlets such as Mézeriez.

== Coat of arms ==
The blazon of the municipal coat of arms is Azure, between two Mullets [of Six] Or as many Garbs of the same in saltire.

== Demographics ==
Salins had a population (as of 2010) of 982. As of 2008, 8.5% of the population are resident foreign nationals. Over the last 10 years (2000–2010 ) the population has changed at a rate of 14.4%. It has changed at a rate of 6.1% due to migration and at a rate of 2.8% due to births and deaths.

Most of the population (as of 2000) speaks French (841 or 95.2%) as their first language, German is the second most common (23 or 2.6%) and Italian is the third (7 or 0.8%).

As of 2008, the population was 48.7% male and 51.3% female. The population was made up of 426 Swiss men (43.8% of the population) and 47 (4.8%) non-Swiss men. There were 449 Swiss women (46.2%) and 50 (5.1%) non-Swiss women. Of the population in the municipality, 330 or about 37.4% were born in Salins and lived there in 2000. There were 356 or 40.3% who were born in the same canton, while 101 or 11.4% were born somewhere else in Switzerland, and 83 or 9.4% were born outside of Switzerland.

As of 2000, children and teenagers (0–19 years old) make up 24.6% of the population, while adults (20–64 years old) make up 59.2% and seniors (over 64 years old) make up 16.2%.

As of 2000, there were 328 people who were single and never married in the municipality. There were 465 married individuals, 62 widows or widowers and 28 individuals who are divorced.

As of 2000, there were 339 private households in the municipality, and an average of 2.5 persons per household. There were 72 households that consist of only one person and 30 households with five or more people. In 2000, a total of 330 apartments (74.8% of the total) were permanently occupied, while 94 apartments (21.3%) were seasonally occupied and 17 apartments (3.9%) were empty. The vacancy rate for the municipality, in 2010, was 1.05%.

The historical population is given in the following chart:

== Politics ==
In the 2007 federal election the most popular party was the CVP which received 36.54% of the vote. The next three most popular parties were the SVP (21.37%), the SP (16.72%) and the FDP (14.98%). In the federal election, a total of 485 votes were cast, and the voter turnout was 68.1%.

In the 2009 Conseil d'Etat/Staatsrat election a total of 380 votes were cast, of which 29 or about 7.6% were invalid. The voter participation was 55.2%, which is similar to the cantonal average of 54.67%. In the 2007 Swiss Council of States election a total of 469 votes were cast, of which 43 or about 9.2% were invalid. The voter participation was 68.2%, which is much more than the cantonal average of 59.88%.

== Economy ==
As of 2010, Salins had an unemployment rate of 3.7%. As of 2008, there were 75 people employed in the primary economic sector and about 17 businesses involved in this sector. 34 people were employed in the secondary sector and there were 8 businesses in this sector. 115 people were employed in the tertiary sector, with 23 businesses in this sector. There were 418 residents of the municipality who were employed in some capacity, of which females made up 40.9% of the workforce.

In 2008 the total number of full-time equivalent jobs was 167. The number of jobs in the primary sector was 37, all of which were in agriculture. The number of jobs in the secondary sector was 32 of which 11 or (34.4%) were in manufacturing and 21 (65.6%) were in construction. The number of jobs in the tertiary sector was 98. In the tertiary sector; 30 or 30.6% were in wholesale or retail sales or the repair of motor vehicles, 32 or 32.7% were in the movement and storage of goods, 4 or 4.1% were in a hotel or restaurant, 2 or 2.0% were in the information industry, 12 or 12.2% were technical professionals or scientists, 8 or 8.2% were in education.

In 2000, there were 56 workers who commuted into the municipality and 344 workers who commuted away. The municipality is a net exporter of workers, with about 6.1 workers leaving the municipality for every one entering. Of the working population, 7.9% used public transportation to get to work, and 81.8% used a private car.

== Religion ==
From the 2000 census, 757 or 85.7% were Roman Catholic, while 50 or 5.7% belonged to the Swiss Reformed Church. Of the rest of the population, there was 1 member of an Orthodox church, and there were 8 individuals (or about 0.91% of the population) who belonged to another Christian church. There were 5 (or about 0.57% of the population) who were Islamic. There was 1 person who was Buddhist and 1 individual who belonged to another church. 36 (or about 4.08% of the population) belonged to no church, are agnostic or atheist, and 28 individuals (or about 3.17% of the population) did not answer the question.

== Education ==
In Salins about 328 or (37.1%) of the population have completed non-mandatory upper secondary education, and 110 or (12.5%) have completed additional higher education (either university or a Fachhochschule). Of the 110 who completed tertiary schooling, 56.4% were Swiss men, 32.7% were Swiss women, 7.3% were non-Swiss men.

As of 2000, there were 8 students in Salins who came from another municipality, while 69 residents attended schools outside the municipality.
