= Les Agettes =

- Former municipality
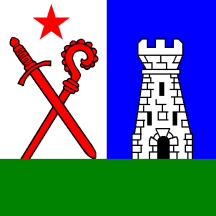
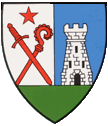
- Flag Coat of arms
- Location of Les Agettes
- Location within Switzerland Location within Canton of Valais
- Coordinates: 46°13′N 7°23′E
- Country: Switzerland
- Canton: Valais
- District: Hérens

Area
  - Total: 5.1 km^{2} (2.0 sq mi)
- Elevation: 1,002 m (3,287 ft)

Population (December 2002)
  - Total: 298
  - Density: 58/km^{2} (150/sq mi)
- Time zone: UTC+01:00 (CET)
  - Summer (DST): UTC+02:00 (CEST)
- Postal code: 1992
- SFOS number: 6081
- ISO 3166 code: CH-VS
- Surrounded by: Nendaz, Salins, Sion, Vex, Veysonnaz
- Website: SFSO statistics

Les Agettes is a former municipality in the district of Hérens in the canton of Valais in Switzerland. The municipality of Les Agettes merged on 1 January 2017 into Sion.

== History ==
Les Agettes is first mentioned in 1190 as Agietes.

== Geography ==
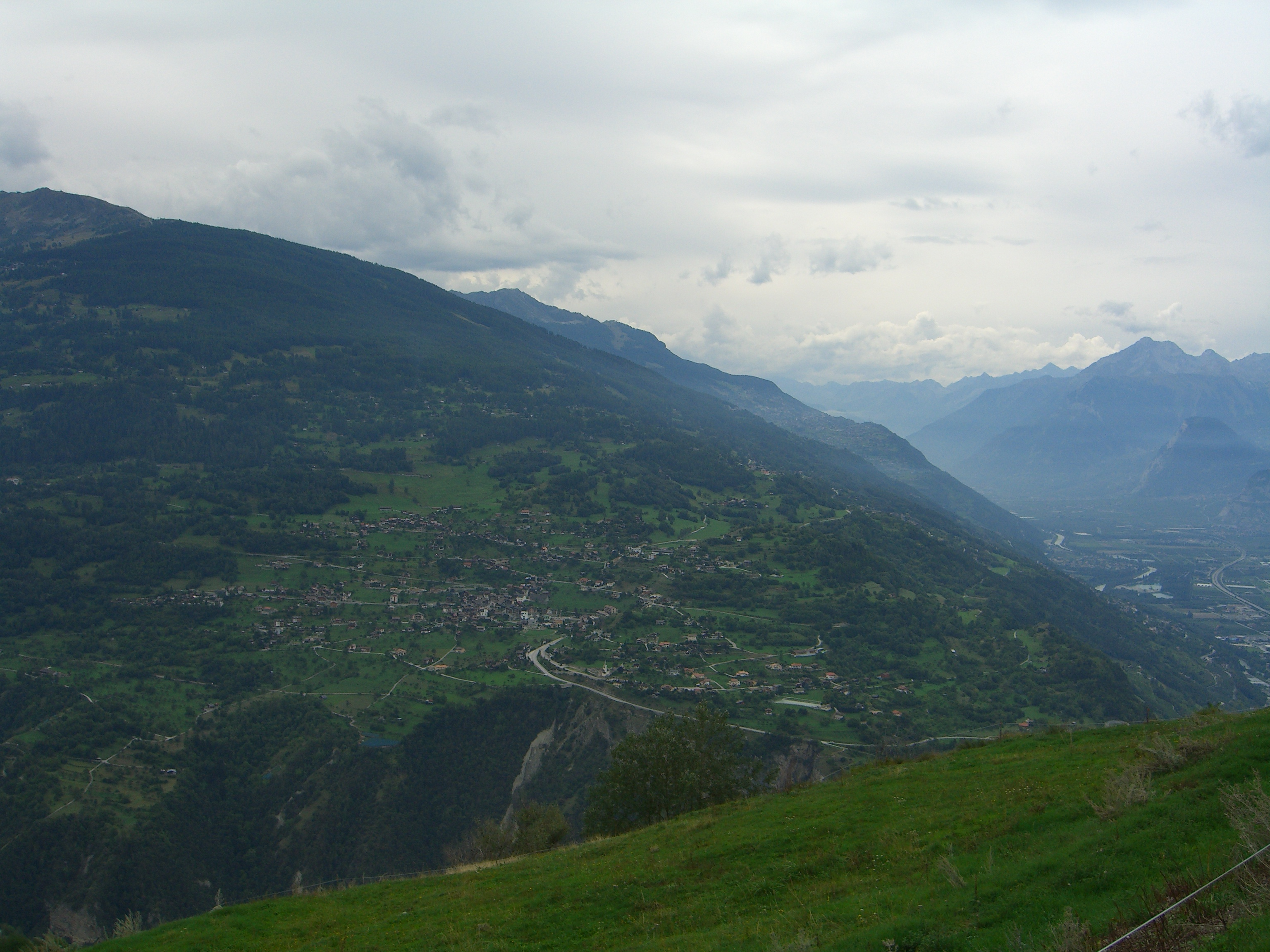
View of Vex and Les Agettes municipalities

Aerial view from 400 m by Walter Mittelholzer (1925)

Les Agettes had an area, as of 2009, of 5.1 square kilometers (2.0 mi^{2}). Of this area, 1.02 km^{2} (0.39 mi^{2}) or 20.0% is used for agricultural purposes, while 3.45 km^{2} (1.33 mi^{2}) or 67.8% is forested. Of the rest of the land, 0.55 km^{2} (0.21 mi^{2}) or 10.8% is settled (buildings or roads) and 0.05 km^{2} (12 acres) or 1.0% is unproductive land.

Of the built up area, housing and buildings made up 6.3% and transportation infrastructure made up 3.5%. Out of the forested land, 61.7% of the total land area is heavily forested and 6.1% is covered with orchards or small clusters of trees. Of the agricultural land, 0.0% is used for growing crops and 11.4% is pastures and 7.7% is used for alpine pastures.

The former municipality was located in the Hérens district, on the slopes south of Sion and above the Rhone valley. It is composed of three small villages: Crête-à-l'Œil, La Vernaz, and Les Agettes, which range in altitude between 980 and 1,200 m (3,220 and 3,940 ft) as well as scattered alpine pastures and the vacation resort of Mayens de l'Ours (built in 1982).

== Coat of arms ==
The blazon of the municipal coat of arms is Per pale Argent a Crosier issuant and a Sword inverted in saltire in chief a Mullet of Five all Gules and Azure a Tower Argent masoned, windowed and doored Sable, overall a base Vert.

== Demographics ==
Les Agettes had a population (as of 2015) of 347. As of 2008, 10.7% of the population are resident foreign nationals. Over the last 10 years (1999–2009 ) the population has changed at a rate of 28.1%. It has changed at a rate of 24.1% due to migration and at a rate of 4.4% due to births and deaths.

Most of the population (as of 2000) speaks French (257 or 95.2%) as their first language, German is the second most common (8 or 3.0%) and Italian is the third (3 or 1.1%).

As of 2008, the gender distribution of the population was 49.4% male and 50.6% female. The population was made up of 155 Swiss men (44.8% of the population) and 16 (4.6%) non-Swiss men. There were 149 Swiss women (43.1%) and 26 (7.5%) non-Swiss women. Of the population in the municipality 104 or about 38.5% were born in Les Agettes and lived there in 2000. There were 82 or 30.4% who were born in the same canton, while 51 or 18.9% were born somewhere else in Switzerland, and 26 or 9.6% were born outside of Switzerland.

The age distribution of the population (as of 2000) is children and teenagers (0–19 years old) make up 25.2% of the population, while adults (20–64 years old) make up 56.7% and seniors (over 64 years old) make up 18.1%.

As of 2000, there were 103 people who were single and never married in the municipality. There were 139 married individuals, 20 widows or widowers and 8 individuals who are divorced.

As of 2000, there were 112 private households in the municipality, and an average of 2.3 persons per household. There were 39 households that consist of only one person and 10 households with five or more people. Out of a total of 116 households that answered this question, 33.6% were households made up of just one person and there was 1 adult who lived with their parents. Of the rest of the households, there are 32 married couples without children, 33 married couples with children There were 6 single parents with a child or children. There was 1 household that was made up of unrelated people and 4 households that were made up of some sort of institution or another collective housing.

In 2000 there were 239 single family homes (or 78.6% of the total) out of a total of 304 inhabited buildings. There were 37 multi-family buildings (12.2%), along with 21 multi-purpose buildings that were mostly used for housing (6.9%) and 7 other use buildings (commercial or industrial) that also had some housing (2.3%).

In 2000, a total of 105 apartments (25.9% of the total) were permanently occupied, while 268 apartments (66.2%) were seasonally occupied and 32 apartments (7.9%) were empty. The vacancy rate for the municipality, in 2010, was 0.47%.

The historical population is given in the following chart:

== Politics ==
In the 2007 federal election the most popular party was the CVP which received 43.54% of the vote. The next three most popular parties were the SP (21.11%), the SVP (15.36%) and the FDP (6.69%). In the federal election, a total of 159 votes were cast, and the voter turnout was 65.7%.

== Economy ==
As of 2010, Les Agettes had an unemployment rate of 6.7%. As of 2008, there were 14 people employed in the primary economic sector and about 10 businesses involved in this sector. 4 people were employed in the secondary sector and there were 4 businesses in this sector. 11 people were employed in the tertiary sector, with 5 businesses in this sector. There were 136 residents of the municipality who were employed in some capacity, of which females made up 40.4% of the workforce.

In 2008 the total number of full-time equivalent jobs was 18. The number of jobs in the primary sector was 6, all of which were in agriculture. The number of jobs in the secondary sector was 4 of which 2 or (50.0%) were in manufacturing and 2 (50.0%) were in construction. The number of jobs in the tertiary sector was 8. In the tertiary sector; 2 or 25.0% were in wholesale or retail sales or the repair of motor vehicles, 1 was in a hotel or restaurant, 4 or 50.0% were in education.

In 2000, there were 9 workers who commuted into the municipality and 118 workers who commuted away. The municipality is a net exporter of workers, with about 13.1 workers leaving the municipality for every one entering. Of the working population, 11.8% used public transportation to get to work, and 78.7% used a private car.

== Religion ==
From the 2000 census, 231 or 85.6% were Roman Catholic, while 9 or 3.3% belonged to the Swiss Reformed Church. Of the rest of the population, there was 1 member of an Orthodox church. 16 (or about 5.93% of the population) belonged to no church, are agnostic or atheist, and 13 individuals (or about 4.81% of the population) did not answer the question.

== Education ==
In Les Agettes about 101 or (37.4%) of the population have completed non-mandatory upper secondary education, and 38 or (14.1%) have completed additional higher education (either university or a Fachhochschule). Of the 38 who completed tertiary schooling, 60.5% were Swiss men, 23.7% were Swiss women.

As of 2000, there were 23 students from Les Agettes who attended schools outside the municipality.
