= Grône =

- Municipality
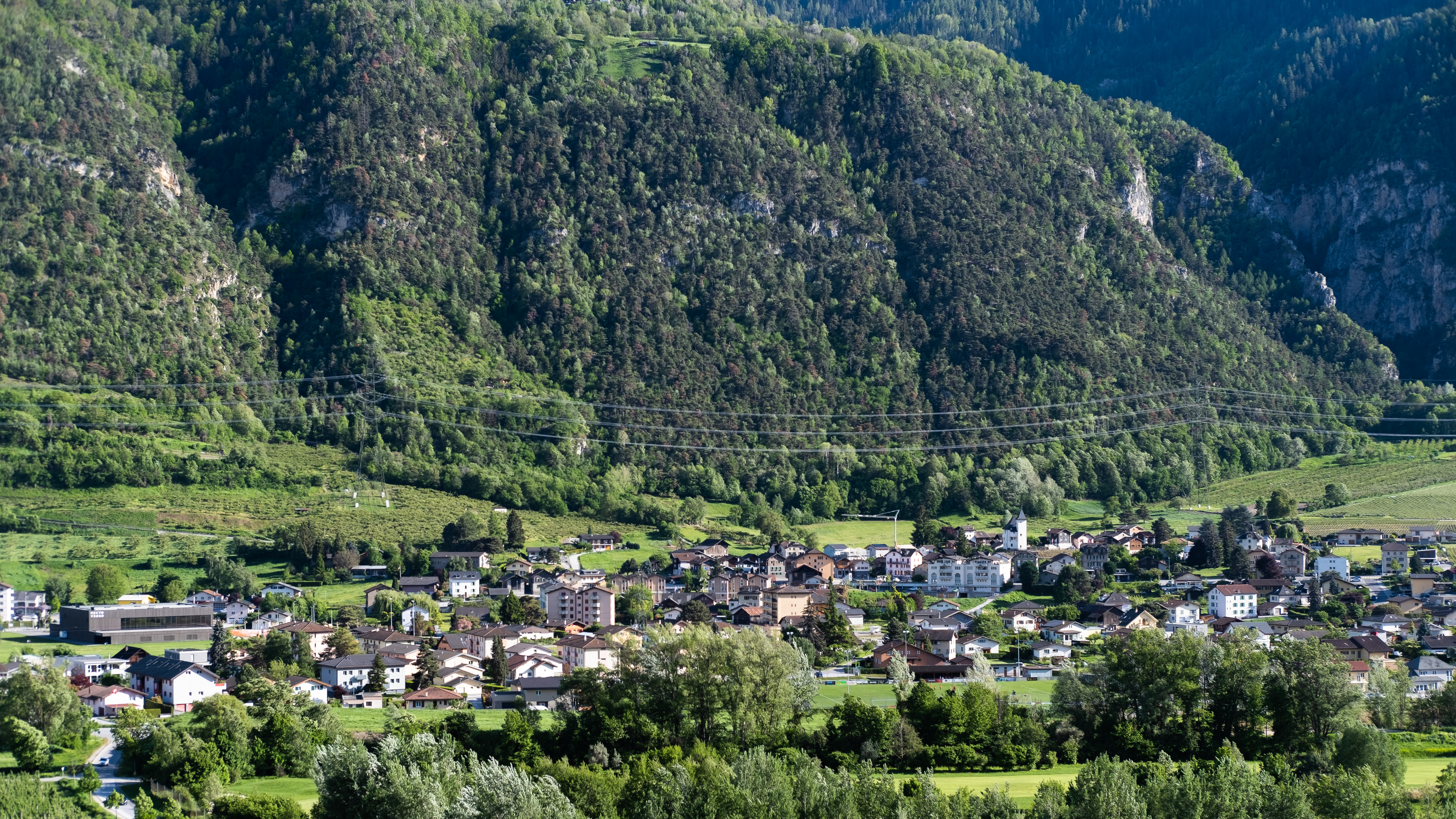

- Flag Coat of arms
- Location of Grône
- Location within Switzerland Location within Canton of Valais
- Coordinates: 46°15′N 7°27′E
- Country: Switzerland
- Canton: Valais
- District: Sierre

Government
  - Mayor: Marcel Bayard

Area
  - Total: 21.1 km^{2} (8.1 sq mi)
- Elevation: 513 m (1,683 ft)

Population (December 2002)
  - Total: 2,002
  - Density: 94.9/km^{2} (246/sq mi)
- Time zone: UTC+01:00 (CET)
  - Summer (DST): UTC+02:00 (CEST)
- Postal code: 3979
- SFOS number: 6238
- ISO 3166 code: CH-VS
- Surrounded by: Chalais, Nax, Anniviers, Saint-Léonard, Sierre, Sion
- Website: www.grone.ch

Grône is a municipality in the district of Sierre in the canton of Valais in Switzerland.

== History ==
Grône is first mentioned around 1001–1100 as in Gruona. The municipality was formerly known by its German name Grün, however, that name is no longer used.

== Geography ==
Grône has an area, as of 2009, of 21.1 square kilometers (8.1 mi^{2}). Of this area, 4.07 km^{2} (1.57 mi^{2}) or 19.3% is used for agricultural purposes, while 13.56 km^{2} (5.24 mi^{2}) or 64.1% is forested. Of the rest of the land, 1.64 km^{2} (0.63 mi^{2}) or 7.8% is settled (buildings or roads), 0.13 km^{2} (32 acres) or 0.6% is either rivers or lakes and 1.7 km^{2} (0.66 mi^{2}) or 8.0% is unproductive land.

Of the built up area, housing and buildings made up 4.2% and transportation infrastructure made up 1.6%. Power and water infrastructure as well as other special developed areas made up 1.5% of the area Out of the forested land, 58.1% of the total land area is heavily forested and 2.7% is covered with orchards or small clusters of trees. Of the agricultural land, 1.5% is used for growing crops and 2.7% is pastures, while 5.1% is used for orchards or vine crops and 10.0% is used for alpine pastures. Of the water in the municipality, 0.4% is in lakes and 0.2% is in rivers and streams. Of the unproductive areas, 6.1% is unproductive vegetation and 2.0% is too rocky for vegetation.

The municipality is located in the Sierre district. The main village lies in the Rhone valley with about ten hamlets in the hills above the village. The hamlets include Loye, Daillet, Itravers and Erdesson. Erdesson was formerly known as Merdesson, but the name was changed after it was rebuilt following a devastating fire in 1912. In the early history of the municipality, the village was often destroyed due to the Rhone floods, so the settlements in the hills were much more important. In 1292, both Grône and Loye were both municipalities.

== Coat of arms ==
The blazon of the municipal coat of arms is Azure an Ibex rampant Argent on Coupeaux Vert.

== Demographics ==
Grône has a population (as of December 2020) of 2,485. As of 2008, 16.4% of the population are resident foreign nationals. Over the last 10 years (2000–2010) the population has changed at a rate of 14.6%. It has changed at a rate of 13.9% due to migration and at a rate of 1.6% due to births and deaths.

Most of the population (as of 2000) speaks French (1,720 or 92.2%) as their first language, German is the second most common (54 or 2.9%) and Portuguese is the third (41 or 2.2%). There are 26 people who speak Italian and 1 person who speaks Romansh.

As of 2008, the population was 49.4% male and 50.6% female. The population was made up of 895 Swiss men (40.9% of the population) and 185 (8.5%) non-Swiss men. There were 923 Swiss women (42.2%) and 184 (8.4%) non-Swiss women. Of the population in the municipality, 860 or about 46.1% were born in Grône and lived there in 2000. There were 543 or 29.1% who were born in the same canton, while 189 or 10.1% were born somewhere else in Switzerland, and 221 or 11.8% were born outside of Switzerland.

As of 2000, children and teenagers (0–19 years old) make up 25.1% of the population, while adults (20–64 years old) make up 59.4% and seniors (over 64 years old) make up 15.4%.

As of 2000, there were 736 people who were single and never married in the municipality. There were 956 married individuals, 94 widows or widowers and 80 individuals who are divorced.

As of 2000, there were 744 private households in the municipality, and an average of 2.5 persons per household. There were 198 households that consist of only one person and 52 households with five or more people. In 2000, a total of 727 apartments (67.9% of the total) were permanently occupied, while 290 apartments (27.1%) were seasonally occupied and 53 apartments (5.0%) were empty. As of 2009, the construction rate of new housing units was 12.3 new units per 1000 residents. The vacancy rate for the municipality, in 2010, was 0.85%.

The historical population is given in the following chart:

== Politics ==
In the 2007 federal election the most popular party was the CVP which received 36.54% of the vote. The next three most popular parties were the FDP (24.77%), the SP (13.25%) and the SVP (12.71%). In the federal election, a total of 904 votes were cast, and the voter turnout was 62.3%.

In the 2009 Conseil d'État/Staatsrat election a total of 926 votes were cast, of which 78 or about 8.4% were invalid. The voter participation was 64.9%, which is much more than the cantonal average of 54.67%. In the 2007 Swiss Council of States election a total of 894 votes were cast, of which 52 or about 5.8% were invalid. The voter participation was 62.1%, which is similar to the cantonal average of 59.88%.

== Economy ==
As of 2010, Grône had an unemployment rate of 4.2%. As of 2008, there were 44 people employed in the primary economic sector and about 22 businesses involved in this sector. 149 people were employed in the secondary sector and there were 21 businesses in this sector. 242 people were employed in the tertiary sector, with 54 businesses in this sector. There were 910 residents of the municipality who were employed in some capacity, of which females made up 42.5% of the workforce.

In 2008 the total number of full-time equivalent jobs was 343. The number of jobs in the primary sector was 18, all of which were in agriculture. The number of jobs in the secondary sector was 141 of which 23 or (16.3%) were in manufacturing and 112 (79.4%) were in construction. The number of jobs in the tertiary sector was 184. In the tertiary sector; 34 or 18.5% were in wholesale or retail sales or the repair of motor vehicles, 32 or 17.4% were in the movement and storage of goods, 19 or 10.3% were in a hotel or restaurant, 4 or 2.2% were the insurance or financial industry, 4 or 2.2% were technical professionals or scientists, 49 or 26.6% were in education.

In 2000, there were 176 workers who commuted into the municipality and 699 workers who commuted away. The municipality is a net exporter of workers, with about 4.0 workers leaving the municipality for every one entering. Of the working population, 10.4% used public transportation to get to work, and 74.4% used a private car.

== Religion ==
From the 2000 census, 1,628 or 87.2% were Roman Catholic, while 63 or 3.4% belonged to the Swiss Reformed Church. Of the rest of the population, there were 7 members of an Orthodox church (or about 0.38% of the population), there was 1 individual who belongs to the Christian Catholic Church, and there were 12 individuals (or about 0.64% of the population) who belonged to another Christian church. There was 1 individual who was Jewish, and 18 (or about 0.96% of the population) who were Islamic. There were 2 individuals who were Buddhist and 3 individuals who were Hindu. 73 (or about 3.91% of the population) belonged to no church, are agnostic or atheist, and 64 individuals (or about 3.43% of the population) did not answer the question.

== Education ==
In Grône about 660 or (35.4%) of the population have completed non-mandatory upper secondary education, and 166 or (8.9%) have completed additional higher education (either university or a Fachhochschule). Of the 166 who completed tertiary schooling, 69.3% were Swiss men, 25.3% were Swiss women, 3.0% were non-Swiss men.

As of 2000, there were 290 students in Grône who came from another municipality, while 73 residents attended schools outside the municipality.

Grône is home to the Bibliothèque communale et scolaire library. The library has (as of 2008) 9,786 books or other media, and loaned out 6,042 items in the same year. It was open a total of 174 days with average of 11 hours per week during that year.
