= Icogne =

- Municipality
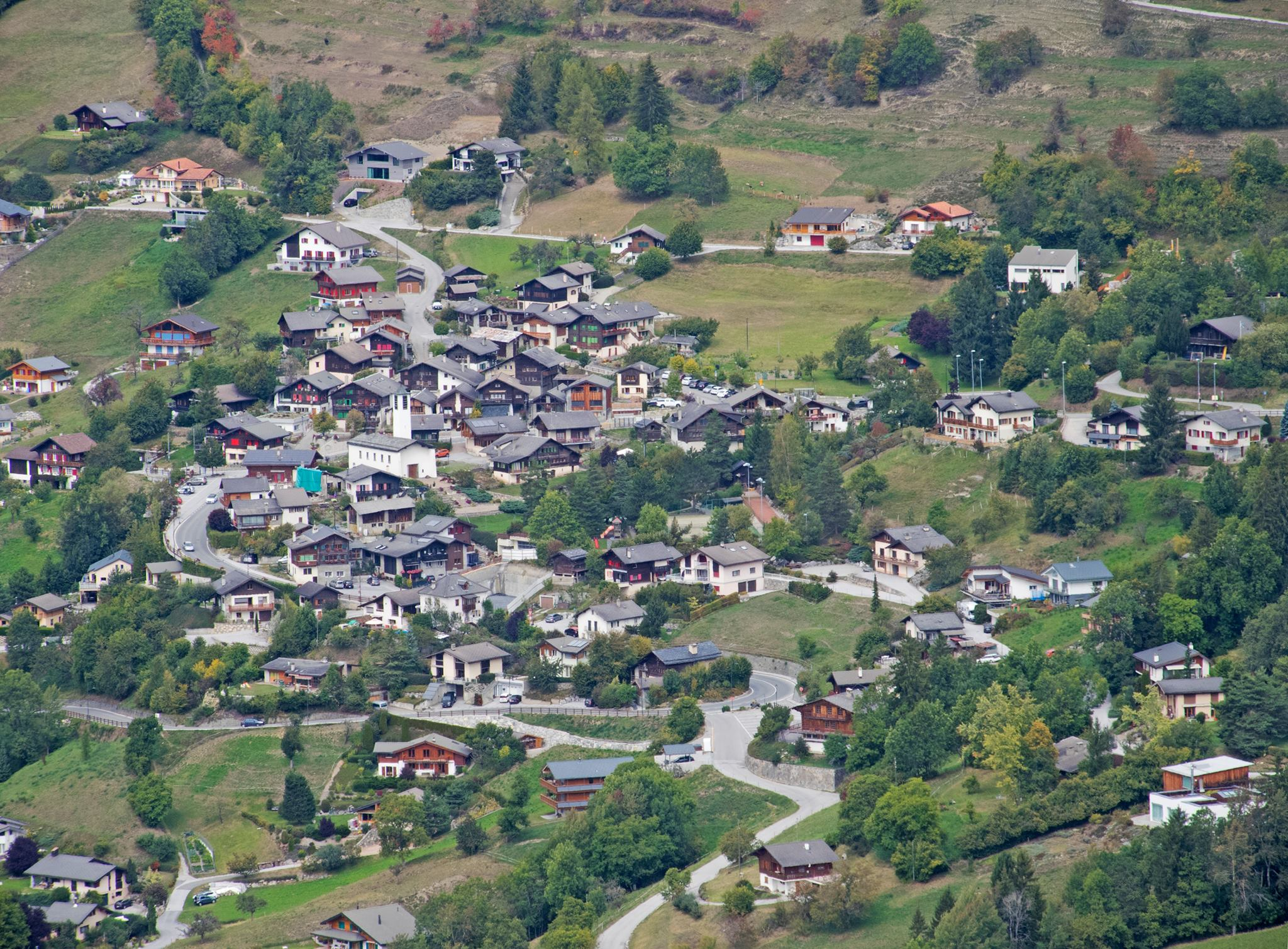
- Icogne Village

- Flag Coat of arms
- Location of Icogne
- Location within Switzerland Location within Canton of Valais
- Coordinates: 46°17′N 7°26′E
- Country: Switzerland
- Canton: Valais
- District: Sierre

Government
  - Mayor: Martial Kamerzin

Area
  - Total: 24.8 km^{2} (9.6 sq mi)
- Elevation: 1,026 m (3,366 ft)

Population (December 2002)
  - Total: 467
  - Density: 18.8/km^{2} (48.8/sq mi)
- Time zone: UTC+01:00 (CET)
  - Summer (DST): UTC+02:00 (CEST)
- Postal code: 1977
- SFOS number: 6239
- ISO 3166 code: CH-VS
- Surrounded by: Ayent, Lenk im Simmental (BE), Lens, Randogne, Saint-Léonard
- Website: https://www.icogne.ch

Icogne (French pronunciation: [ikɔɲ]) is a municipality in the district of Sierre in the canton of Valais in Switzerland.

== History ==
Icogne is first mentioned in 1233 as Ucogni. In 1249 it was mentioned as Ucogniez.

== Geography ==
Aerial view (1955)

Icogne has an area, as of 2009, of 24.8 square kilometers (9.6 mi^{2}). Of this area, 3.6 km^{2} (1.4 mi^{2}) or 14.5% is used for agricultural purposes, while 7.7 km^{2} (3.0 mi^{2}) or 31.0% is forested. Of the rest of the land, 0.61 km^{2} (0.24 mi^{2}) or 2.5% is settled (buildings or roads), 0.57 km^{2} (0.22 mi^{2}) or 2.3% is either rivers or lakes and 12.5 km^{2} (4.8 mi^{2}) or 50.4% is unproductive land.

Of the built up area, housing and buildings made up 1.3% and transportation infrastructure made up 0.8%. Out of the forested land, 27.2% of the total land area is heavily forested and 3.2% is covered with orchards or small clusters of trees. Of the agricultural land, 0.2% is used for growing crops and 3.4% is pastures and 10.8% is used for alpine pastures. Of the water in the municipality, 1.5% is in lakes and 0.8% is in rivers and streams. Of the unproductive areas, 12.0% is unproductive vegetation and 37.6% is too rocky for vegetation.

The municipality is located in the Sierre district, between Ayent to the west and Lens to the east and on the left bank of the Lienne river. It consists of the village of Icogne and a portion of the ski resort of Crans-Montana. In 1905 it separated from Lens and became an independent municipality.

The reservoir Lac de Tseuzier is located on the border with Ayent.

== Coat of arms ==
The blazon of the municipal coat of arms is Argent issuant from Coupeaux vert three Pine-trees of the same trunked proper on a chief Azure a Mullet of Five Or and an Edelweiss of the first seeded of the last.

== Demographics ==
Icogne has a population (as of December 2020) of 633. As of 2008, 17.6% of the population are resident foreign nationals. Over the last 10 years (2000–2010 ) the population has changed at a rate of 8.6%. It has changed at a rate of 16% due to migration and at a rate of -1.1% due to births and deaths.

Most of the population (as of 2000) speaks French (364 or 90.1%) as their first language, German is the second most common (21 or 5.2%) and Italian is the third (8 or 2.0%).

As of 2008, the population was 48.3% male and 51.7% female. The population was made up of 195 Swiss men (39.4% of the population) and 44 (8.9%) non-Swiss men. There were 211 Swiss women (42.6%) and 45 (9.1%) non-Swiss women. Of the population in the municipality, 172 or about 42.6% were born in Icogne and lived there in 2000. There were 95 or 23.5% who were born in the same canton, while 56 or 13.9% were born somewhere else in Switzerland, and 63 or 15.6% were born outside of Switzerland.

As of 2000, children and teenagers (0–19 years old) make up 19.1% of the population, while adults (20–64 years old) make up 60.1% and seniors (over 64 years old) make up 20.8%.

As of 2000, there were 134 people who were single and never married in the municipality. There were 219 married individuals, 26 widows or widowers and 25 individuals who are divorced.

As of 2000, there were 177 private households in the municipality, and an average of 2.2 persons per household. There were 57 households that consist of only one person and 7 households with five or more people. In 2000, a total of 166 apartments (31.4% of the total) were permanently occupied, while 346 apartments (65.5%) were seasonally occupied and 16 apartments (3.0%) were empty. As of 2009, the construction rate of new housing units was 4 new units per 1000 residents. The vacancy rate for the municipality, in 2010, was 1.05%.

The historical population is given in the following chart:

== Politics ==
In the 2007 federal election the most popular party was the SP which received 32.14% of the vote. The next three most popular parties were the CVP (28.09%), the SVP (14.96%) and the Green Party (11.76%). In the federal election, a total of 234 votes were cast, and the voter turnout was 62.2%.

In the 2009 Conseil d'État/Staatsrat election a total of 191 votes were cast, of which 25 or about 13.1% were invalid. The voter participation was 50.5%, which is similar to the cantonal average of 54.67%. In the 2007 Swiss Council of States election a total of 230 votes were cast, of which 12 or about 5.2% were invalid. The voter participation was 61.7%, which is similar to the cantonal average of 59.88%.

== Economy ==
As of 2010, Icogne had an unemployment rate of 2%. As of 2008, there were 13 people employed in the primary economic sector and about 8 businesses involved in this sector. 36 people were employed in the secondary sector and there were 9 businesses in this sector. 44 people were employed in the tertiary sector, with 10 businesses in this sector. There were 202 residents of the municipality who were employed in some capacity, of which females made up 43.1% of the workforce.

In 2008 the total number of full-time equivalent jobs was 80. The number of jobs in the primary sector was 6, all of which were in agriculture. The number of jobs in the secondary sector was 35 of which 5 or (14.3%) were in manufacturing and 30 (85.7%) were in construction. The number of jobs in the tertiary sector was 39. In the tertiary sector; 2 or 5.1% were in wholesale or retail sales or the repair of motor vehicles, 14 or 35.9% were in a hotel or restaurant and 1 was in the information industry.

In 2000, there were 11 workers who commuted into the municipality and 140 workers who commuted away. The municipality is a net exporter of workers, with about 12.7 workers leaving the municipality for every one entering. Of the working population, 6.9% used public transportation to get to work, and 70.8% used a private car.

== Religion ==
From the 2000 census, 326 or 80.7% were Roman Catholic, while 26 or 6.4% belonged to the Swiss Reformed Church. Of the rest of the population, there were 3 members of an Orthodox church (or about 0.74% of the population). There were 2 individuals (or about 0.50% of the population) who were Jewish, and 2 (or about 0.50% of the population) who were Islamic. There was 1 person who was Buddhist. 26 (or about 6.44% of the population) belonged to no church, are agnostic or atheist, and 18 individuals (or about 4.46% of the population) did not answer the question.

== Education ==
In Icogne about 145 or (35.9%) of the population have completed non-mandatory upper secondary education, and 66 or (16.3%) have completed additional higher education (either university or a Fachhochschule). Of the 66 who completed tertiary schooling, 34.8% were Swiss men, 31.8% were Swiss women, 22.7% were non-Swiss men and 10.6% were non-Swiss women.

As of 2000, there were 62 students from Icogne who attended schools outside the municipality.

Icogne is one of the participating municipalities in the Écoles des Villages organization, which maintains six school sites. École Primaire Lens-Icogne in Lens is the school site of the community.

The Bibliothèque de Crans-Montana and Bibliothèque-Mediathèque Sierre, two libraries, are in surrounding municipalities.
