= Ayent =

- Municipality
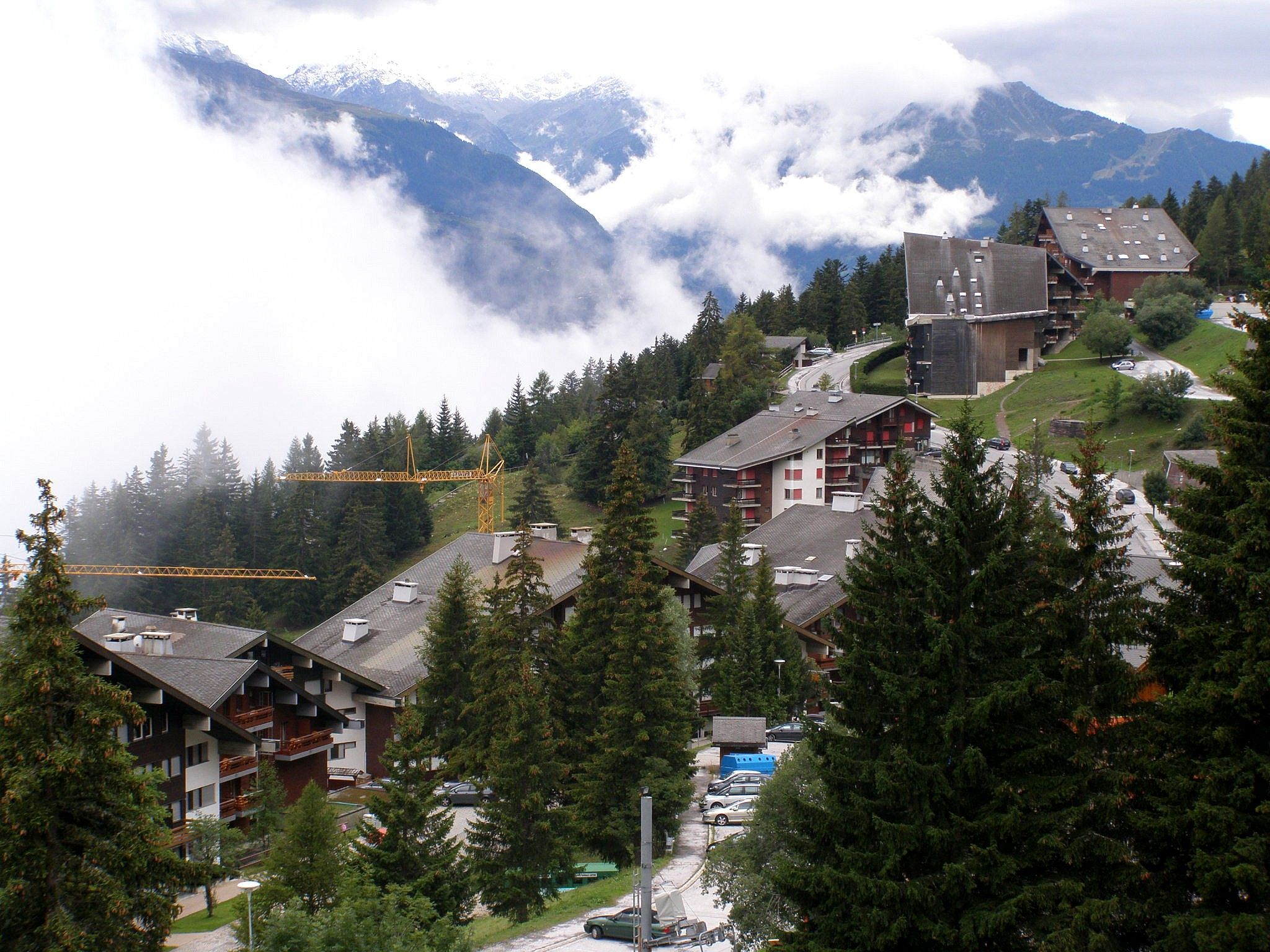
- Anzère village

- Flag Coat of arms
- Location of Ayent
- Location within Switzerland Location within Canton of Valais
- Coordinates: 46°17′N 7°24′E
- Country: Switzerland
- Canton: Valais
- District: Hérens

Government
  - Mayor: Marco Aymon

Area
  - Total: 55.1 km^{2} (21.3 sq mi)
- Elevation: 967 m (3,173 ft)
- Highest elevation (Wildhorn): 3,247 m (10,653 ft)
- Lowest elevation (hameau de la Maya): 508 m (1,667 ft)

Population (March 2008)
  - Total: 3,516
  - Density: 63.8/km^{2} (165/sq mi)
- Time zone: UTC+01:00 (CET)
  - Summer (DST): UTC+02:00 (CEST)
- Postal code: 1966
- SFOS number: 6082
- ISO 3166 code: CH-VS
- Localities: Botyre, Luc, Saxonne, La Place, Blignou, Fortunau, Saint-Romain, Signèse, Villa, Argnou, Anzère
- Surrounded by: Arbaz, Grimisuat, Icogne, Lauenen (BE), Lenk im Simmental (BE), Saint-Léonard, Savièse, Sion
- Twin towns: Saint-Brévin-les-Pins (France)
- Website: www.ayent.ch

Ayent (French pronunciation: [ajɛ̃]) is a municipality in the district of Hérens in the canton of Valais in Switzerland.

== History ==
The Ayent area is first mentioned in 1052 as Agent. In 1250 it was mentioned as Argenta.

== Geography ==
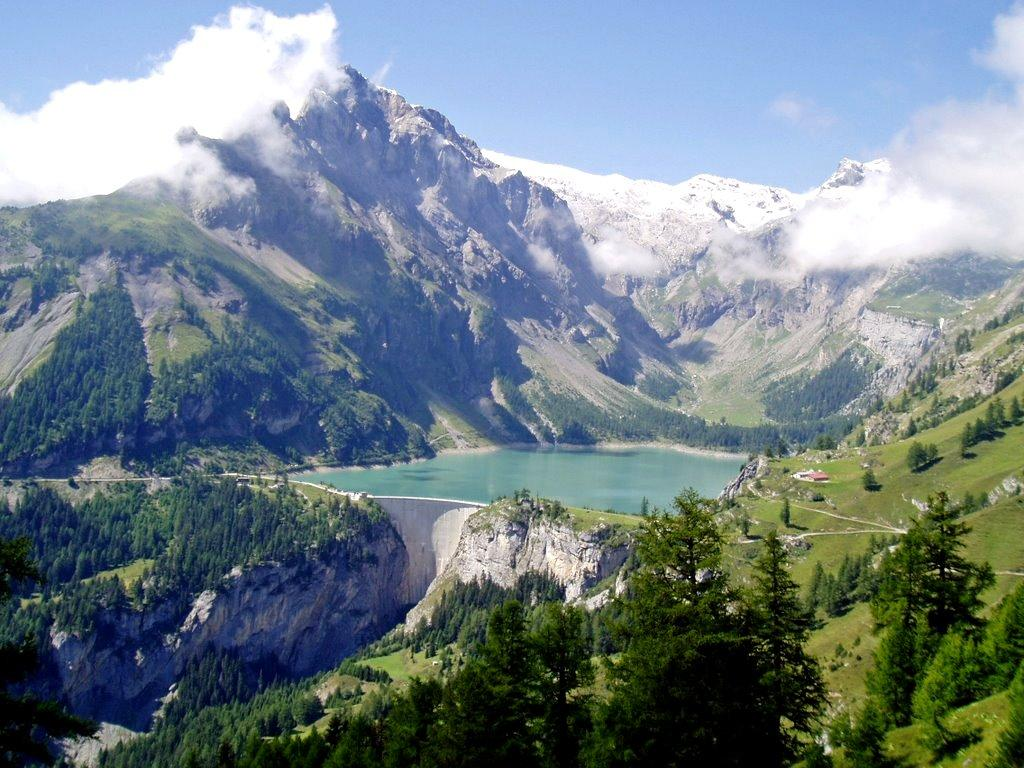
Lac de Tseuzier

Aerial view (1955)

Ayent has an area, as of 2009, of 55.1 square kilometers (21.3 mi^{2}). Of this area, 10.42 km^{2} (4.02 mi^{2}) or 18.9% is used for agricultural purposes, while 13.35 km^{2} (5.15 mi^{2}) or 24.2% is forested. Of the rest of the land, 2.55 km^{2} (0.98 mi^{2}) or 4.6% is settled (buildings or roads), 0.75 km^{2} (0.29 mi^{2}) or 1.4% is either rivers or lakes and 27.97 km^{2} (10.80 mi^{2}) or 50.7% is unproductive land.

Of the built up area, housing and buildings made up 2.5% and transportation infrastructure made up 1.6%. Out of the forested land, 20.4% of the total land area is heavily forested and 3.4% is covered with orchards or small clusters of trees. Of the agricultural land, 0.5% is used for growing crops and 5.2% is pastures, while 3.2% is used for orchards or vine crops and 10.0% is used for alpine pastures. Of the water in the municipality, 1.1% is in lakes and 0.2% is in rivers and streams. Of the unproductive areas, 8.2% is unproductive vegetation, 39.6% is too rocky for vegetation and 3.0% of the land is covered by glaciers.

The municipality is located on a high terrace on the right side of the Rhone river. It consists of the villages and hamlets of Botyre, Luc, Saxonne, La Place, Blignou, Fortunau, Saint-Romain, Signèse, Villa, Argnou and the tourist development of Anzère (which was built in 1969). There is no Ayent village in the municipality.

The reservoir Lac de Tseuzier is located on the border with Icogne.

== Coat of arms ==
The blazon of the municipal coat of arms is Azure a Lion rampant Or langued and armed Gules holding in dexter a sword Argent.

== Demographics ==
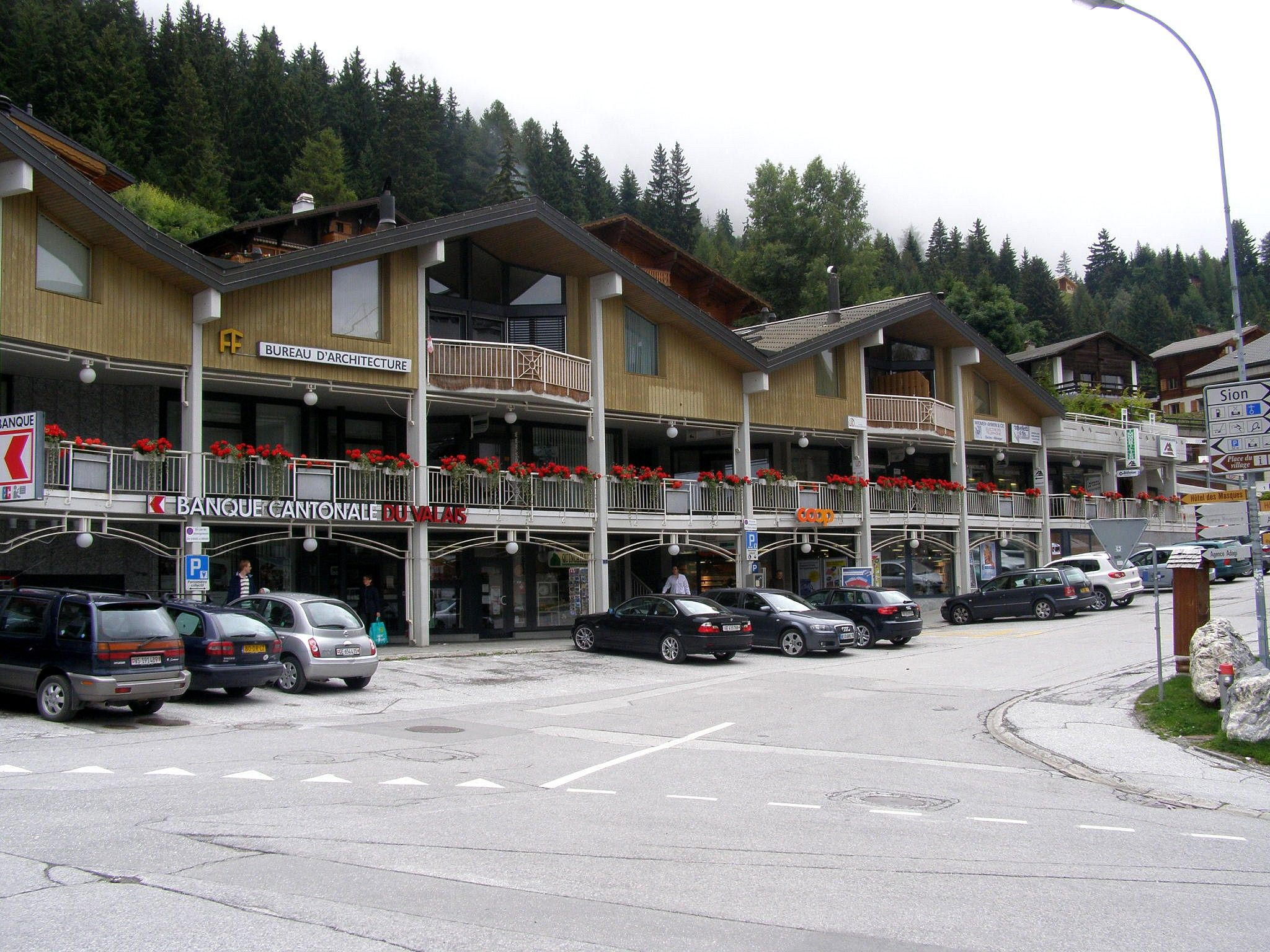
Anzere downtown

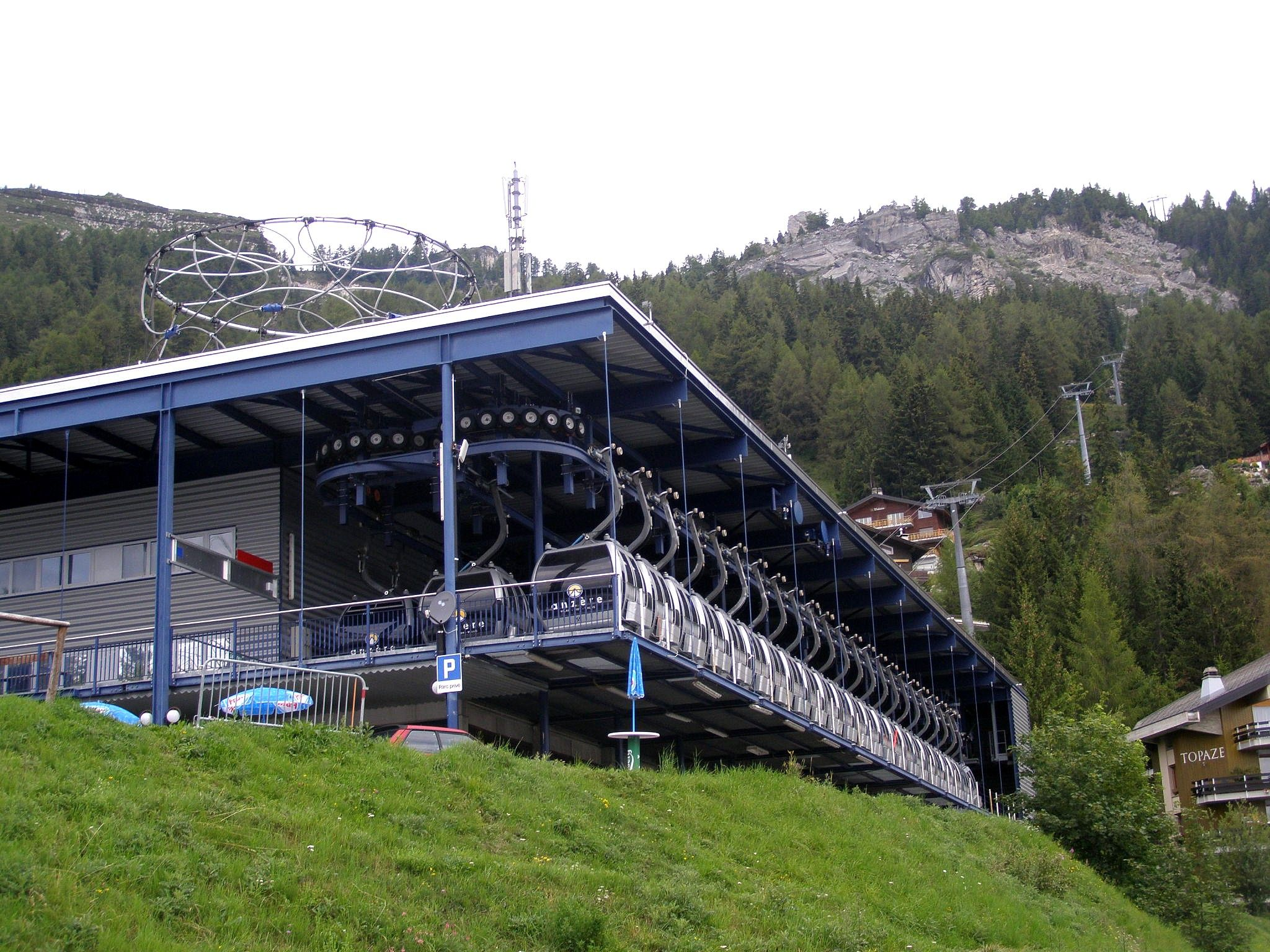
Cable car at Anzere

Ayent has a population (as of December 2020) of 4,137. As of 2008, 10.6% of the population are resident foreign nationals. Over the last 10 years (1999–2009) the population has changed at a rate of 11.6%. It has changed at a rate of 12.4% due to migration and at a rate of 0% due to births and deaths.

Most of the population (as of 2000) speaks French (2,808 or 93.6%) as their first language, German is the second most common (83 or 2.8%) and Portuguese is the third (41 or 1.4%). There are 15 people who speak Italian and 1 person who speaks Romansh.

As of 2008, the gender distribution of the population was 49.7% male and 50.3% female. The population was made up of 1,537 Swiss men (44.0% of the population) and 196 (5.6%) non-Swiss men. There were 1,567 Swiss women (44.9%) and 190 (5.4%) non-Swiss women. Of the population in the municipality 1,903 or about 63.4% were born in Ayent and lived there in 2000. There were 433 or 14.4% who were born in the same canton, while 294 or 9.8% were born somewhere else in Switzerland, and 274 or 9.1% were born outside of Switzerland.

The age distribution of the population (as of 2000) is children and teenagers (0–19 years old) make up 20.9% of the population, while adults (20–64 years old) make up 60.5% and seniors (over 64 years old) make up 18.6%.

As of 2000, there were 1,130 people who were single and never married in the municipality. There were 1,638 married individuals, 166 widows or widowers and 67 individuals who are divorced.

As of 2000, there were 1,210 private households in the municipality, and an average of 2.4 persons per household. There were 318 households that consist of only one person and 77 households with five or more people. Out of a total of 1,248 households that answered this question, 25.5% were households made up of just one person and there were 24 adults who lived with their parents. Of the rest of the households, there are 374 married couples without children, 431 married couples with children There were 46 single parents with a child or children. There were 17 households that were made up of unrelated people and 38 households that were made up of some sort of institution or another collective housing.

In 2000 there were 925 single family homes (or 70.1% of the total) out of a total of 1,320 inhabited buildings. There were 294 multi-family buildings (22.3%), along with 65 multi-purpose buildings that were mostly used for housing (4.9%) and 36 other use buildings (commercial or industrial) that also had some housing (2.7%).

In 2000, a total of 1,153 apartments (39.0% of the total) were permanently occupied, while 1,028 apartments (34.8%) were seasonally occupied and 774 apartments (26.2%) were empty. As of 2009, the construction rate of new housing units was 6.9 new units per 1000 residents. The vacancy rate for the municipality, in 2010, was 0.09%.

The historical population is given in the following chart:

== Politics ==
In the 2007 federal election the most popular party was the CVP which received 38.87% of the vote. The next three most popular parties were the SP (29.03%), the SVP (12.79%) and the FDP (10.25%). In the federal election, a total of 1,729 votes were cast, and the voter turnout was 65.3%.

In the 2009 Conseil d'État/Staatsrat election a total of 1,553 votes were cast, of which 86 or about 5.5% were invalid. The voter participation was 59.1%, which is similar to the cantonal average of 54.67%. In the 2007 Swiss Council of States election a total of 1,707 votes were cast, of which 108 or about 6.3% were invalid. The voter participation was 65.8%, which is much more than the cantonal average of 59.88%.

== Economy ==
As of 2010, Ayent had an unemployment rate of 4.8%. As of 2008, there were 121 people employed in the primary economic sector and about 59 businesses involved in this sector. 208 people were employed in the secondary sector and there were 34 businesses in this sector. 478 people were employed in the tertiary sector, with 107 businesses in this sector. There were 1,499 residents of the municipality who were employed in some capacity, of which females made up 42.6% of the workforce.

In 2008 the total number of full-time equivalent jobs was 622. The number of jobs in the primary sector was 73, of which 65 were in agriculture and 8 were in forestry or lumber production. The number of jobs in the secondary sector was 194 of which 26 or (13.4%) were in manufacturing and 164 (84.5%) were in construction. The number of jobs in the tertiary sector was 355. In the tertiary sector; 70 or 19.7% were in wholesale or retail sales or the repair of motor vehicles, 35 or 9.9% were in the movement and storage of goods, 99 or 27.9% were in a hotel or restaurant, 1 was in the information industry, 5 or 1.4% were the insurance or financial industry, 34 or 9.6% were technical professionals or scientists, 21 or 5.9% were in education and 10 or 2.8% were in health care.

In 2000, there were 187 workers who commuted into the municipality and 855 workers who commuted away. The municipality is a net exporter of workers, with about 4.6 workers leaving the municipality for every one entering. Of the working population, 8.2% used public transportation to get to work, and 77.2% used a private car.

== Religion ==
From the 2000 census, 2,593 or 86.4% were Roman Catholic, while 140 or 4.7% belonged to the Swiss Reformed Church. Of the rest of the population, there were 16 members of an Orthodox church (or about 0.53% of the population), and there were 20 individuals (or about 0.67% of the population) who belonged to another Christian church. There were 6 (or about 0.20% of the population) who were Islamic. There were 2 individuals who were Buddhist, 1 person who was Hindu and 2 individuals who belonged to another church. 132 (or about 4.40% of the population) belonged to no church, are agnostic or atheist, and 96 individuals (or about 3.20% of the population) did not answer the question.

== Education ==
In Ayent about 1,004 or (33.5%) of the population have completed non-mandatory upper secondary education, and 299 or (10.0%) have completed additional higher education (either university or a Fachhochschule). Of the 299 who completed tertiary schooling, 57.9% were Swiss men, 27.1% were Swiss women, 7.7% were non-Swiss men and 7.4% were non-Swiss women.

As of 2000, there were 4 students in Ayent who came from another municipality, while 92 residents attended schools outside the municipality.

Ayent is home to the Bibliothèque communale et scolaire library. The library has (as of 2008) 10,332 books or other media, and loaned out 28,200 items in the same year. It was open a total of 260 days with average of 22 hours per week during that year.
