= Lac de Tseuzier =

Reservoir in Switzerland

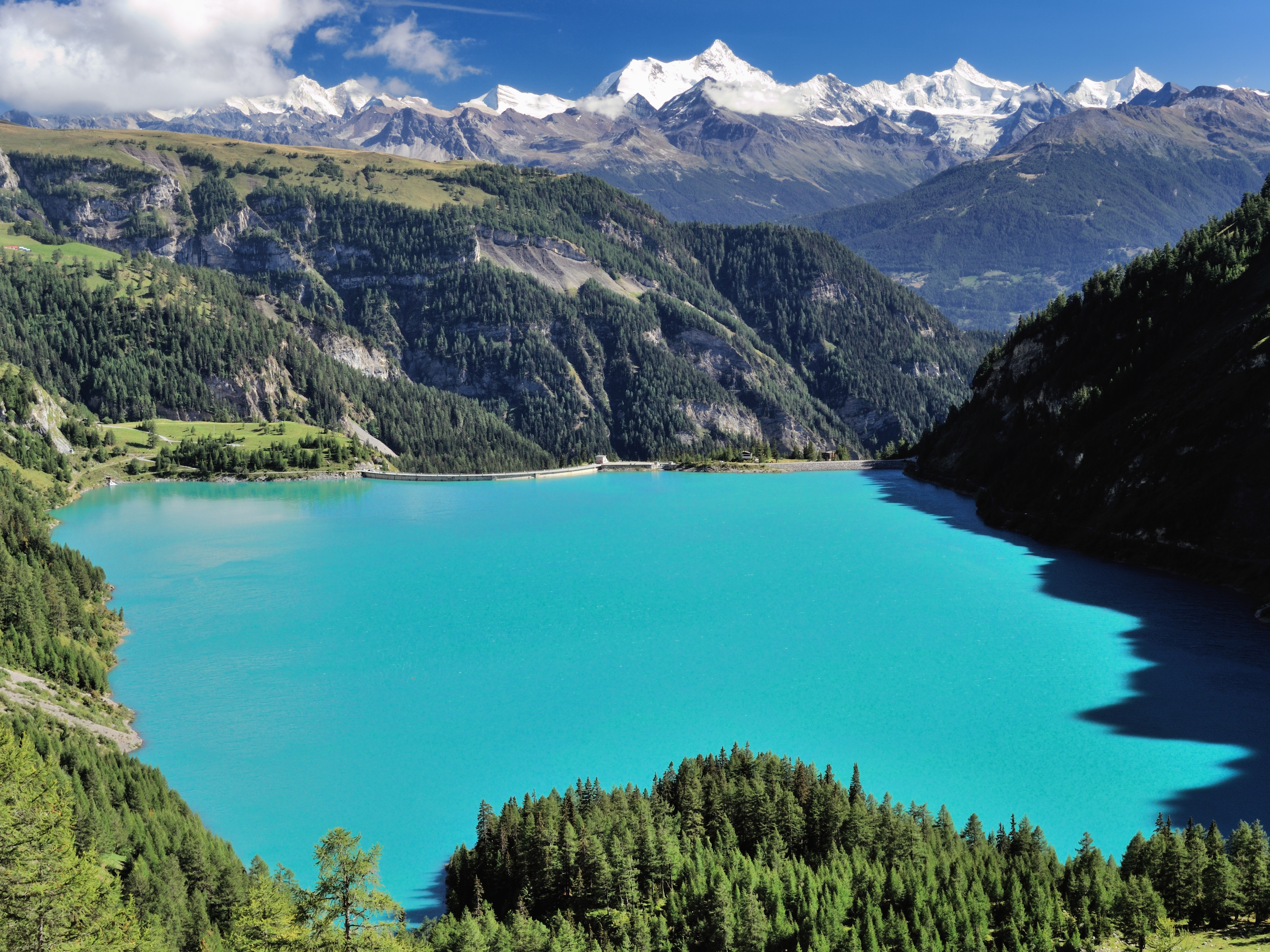
- View of Lac de Tseuzier with the Weisshorn range in the background

- Location within Canton of Valais Location within Canton of Bern Location within Piedmont Location within Switzerland Location within Italy Location within Alps
- Interactive map of Lac de Tseuzier
- Location: Valais
- Coordinates: 46°21′3″N 7°25′50″E
- Type: reservoir
- Primary outflows: La Liène
- Catchment area: 18.7 km^{2} (7.2 sq mi)
- Basin countries: Switzerland
- Surface area: 0.85 km^{2} (0.33 sq mi)
- Max. depth: 140 m (460 ft)
- Water volume: 51 million cubic metres (41,000 acre⋅ft)
- Surface elevation: 1,777 m (5,830 ft)

Lac de Tseuzier is an artificial lake in the canton of Valais, Switzerland. It is located in the municipalities of Ayent and Icogne. The reservoir has a volume of 51 mio m³ and a surface area of 0.85 km^{2} (0.33 sq mi). It was formed by the dams of Zeuzier (156 m) and Proz-Riond (20 m) built in 1957.

== See also ==
- List of lakes of Switzerland
- List of mountain lakes of Switzerland
