= Arbaz =

- Municipality
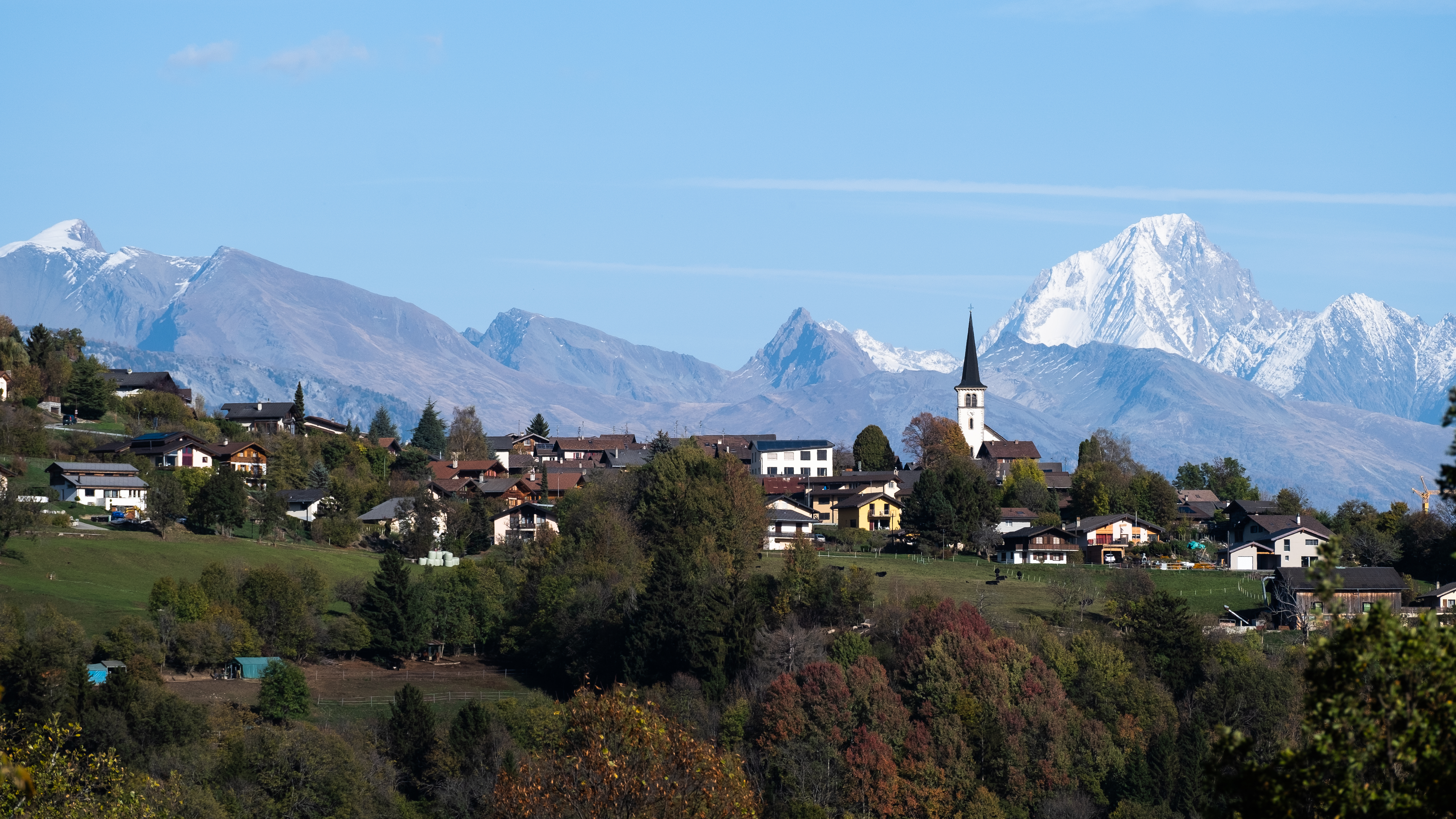
- Arbaz as seen from Savièse

- Flag Coat of arms
- Location of Arbaz
- Location within Switzerland Location within Canton of Valais
- Coordinates: 46°16′N 7°23′E
- Country: Switzerland
- Canton: Valais
- District: Sion

Government
  - Mayor: Vincent Rebstein

Area
  - Total: 19.3 km^{2} (7.5 sq mi)
- Elevation: 1,146 m (3,760 ft)

Population (December 2002)
  - Total: 848
  - Density: 43.9/km^{2} (114/sq mi)
- Time zone: UTC+01:00 (CET)
  - Summer (DST): UTC+02:00 (CEST)
- Postal code: 1974
- SFOS number: 6261
- ISO 3166 code: CH-VS
- Surrounded by: Ayent, Grimisuat, Savièse
- Website: www.arbaz.ch

Arbaz is a municipality in the district of Sion in the canton of Valais in Switzerland.

== History ==
Historic aerial photograph by Werner Friedli from 1955

Arbaz is first mentioned about 1185 as Alba. In 1338 it was mentioned as Arba.

== Geography ==
Arbaz has an area, as of 2009, of 19.3 square kilometers (7.5 mi^{2}). Of this area, 4.25 km^{2} (1.64 mi^{2}) or 22.0% is used for agricultural purposes, while 4.83 km^{2} (1.86 mi^{2}) or 25.0% is forested. Of the rest of the land, 0.99 km^{2} (0.38 mi^{2}) or 5.1% is settled (buildings or roads), 0.06 km^{2} (15 acres) or 0.3% is either rivers or lakes and 9.15 km^{2} (3.53 mi^{2}) or 47.4% is unproductive land.

Of the built up area, housing and buildings made up 3.2% and transportation infrastructure made up 1.3%. Out of the forested land, 19.5% of the total land area is heavily forested and 3.8% is covered with orchards or small clusters of trees. Of the agricultural land, 0.9% is used for growing crops and 5.3% is pastures and 15.5% is used for alpine pastures. All the water in the municipality is flowing water. Of the unproductive areas, 17.2% is unproductive vegetation and 30.3% is too rocky for vegetation.

The municipality is located in the Sion district, at an elevation of between 830 and 2,886 m (2,723 and 9,469 ft). Until 1877 it was part of the municipality of Ayent. The village of Arbaz was partially destroyed by fire in 1924, but has been rebuilt. Almost half of the houses in the village are vacation homes. It is situated on the north bank of the Rhône River.

== Coat of arms ==
The blazon of the municipal coat of arms is Azure a Cross Gules, overall standing on issuant from base a triple mount Or a Lion rampant reguardant Or langued Gules.

== Demographics ==
Arbaz has a population (as of December 2020) of 1,360. As of 2008, 12.5% of the population are resident foreign nationals. Over the last 10 years (2000–2010 ) the population has changed at a rate of 35.9%. It has changed at a rate of 37% due to migration and at a rate of 1.6% due to births and deaths.

Most of the population (as of 2000) speaks French (727 or 90.9%) as their first language, German is the second most common (40 or 5.0%) and Portuguese is the third (13 or 1.6%). There is 1 person who speaks Italian.

As of 2008, the population was 49.8% male and 50.2% female. The population was made up of 475 Swiss men (43.3% of the population) and 72 (6.6%) non-Swiss men. There were 485 Swiss women (44.2%) and 66 (6.0%) non-Swiss women. Of the population in the municipality, 435 or about 54.4% were born in Arbaz and lived there in 2000. There were 154 or 19.3% who were born in the same canton, while 113 or 14.1% were born somewhere else in Switzerland, and 88 or 11.0% were born outside of Switzerland.

As of 2000, children and teenagers (0–19 years old) make up 24.8% of the population, while adults (20–64 years old) make up 56.1% and seniors (over 64 years old) make up 19.1%.

As of 2000, there were 301 people who were single and never married in the municipality. There were 430 married individuals, 46 widows or widowers and 23 individuals who are divorced.

As of 2000, there were 322 private households in the municipality, and an average of 2.4 persons per household. There were 85 households that consist of only one person and 22 households with five or more people. In 2000, a total of 318 apartments (45.3% of the total) were permanently occupied, while 335 apartments (47.7%) were seasonally occupied and 49 apartments (7.0%) were empty. As of 2009, the construction rate of new housing units was 5.2 new units per 1000 residents. The vacancy rate for the municipality, in 2010, was 0.72%.

The historical population is given in the following chart:

== Politics ==
In the 2007 federal election the most popular party was the CVP which received 42.43% of the vote. The next three most popular parties were the SP (21.32%), the SVP (16.47%) and the FDP (8.33%). In the federal election, a total of 483 votes were cast, and the voter turnout was 65.6%.

In the 2009 Conseil d'État/Staatsrat election a total of 436 votes were cast, of which 42 or about 9.6% were invalid. The voter participation was 59.1%, which is similar to the cantonal average of 54.67%. In the 2007 Swiss Council of States election a total of 465 votes were cast, of which 9 or about 1.9% were invalid. The voter participation was 65.8%, which is much more than the cantonal average of 59.88%.

== Economy ==
As of 2010, Arbaz had an unemployment rate of 3.4%. As of 2008, there were 26 people employed in the primary economic sector and about 11 businesses involved in this sector. 69 people were employed in the secondary sector and there were 12 businesses in this sector. 79 people were employed in the tertiary sector, with 23 businesses in this sector. There were 347 residents of the municipality who were employed in some capacity, of which females made up 42.1% of the workforce.

In 2008 the total number of full-time equivalent jobs was 92. The number of jobs in the primary sector was 17, all of which were in agriculture. The number of jobs in the secondary sector was 37 of which 13 or (35.1%) were in manufacturing and 24 (64.9%) were in construction. The number of jobs in the tertiary sector was 38. In the tertiary sector; 8 or 21.1% were in wholesale or retail sales or the repair of motor vehicles, 2 or 5.3% were in the movement and storage of goods, 7 or 18.4% were in a hotel or restaurant, 3 or 7.9% were in the information industry, 3 or 7.9% were the insurance or financial industry, 5 or 13.2% were technical professionals or scientists, 1 was in education.

In 2000, there were 20 workers who commuted into the municipality and 254 workers who commuted away. The municipality is a net exporter of workers, with about 12.7 workers leaving the municipality for every one entering. Of the working population, 8.8% used public transportation to get to work, and 76.3% used a private car.

== Religion ==
From the 2000 census, 657 or 82.1% were Roman Catholic, while 63 or 7.9% belonged to the Swiss Reformed Church. Of the rest of the population, there were 5 members of an Orthodox church (or about 0.63% of the population), and there were 25 individuals (or about 3.13% of the population) who belonged to another Christian church. There were 6 (or about 0.75% of the population) who were Islamic. There were 1 individual who belonged to another church. 44 (or about 5.50% of the population) belonged to no church, are agnostic or atheist, and 11 individuals (or about 1.38% of the population) did not answer the question.

== Education ==
In Arbaz about 285 or (35.6%) of the population have completed non-mandatory upper secondary education, and 103 or (12.9%) have completed additional higher education (either university or a Fachhochschule). Of the 103 who completed tertiary schooling, 54.4% were Swiss men, 28.2% were Swiss women, 10.7% were non-Swiss men and 6.8% were non-Swiss women.

As of 2000, there were 2 students in Arbaz who came from another municipality, while 42 residents attended schools outside the municipality.
