= Grimisuat =

- Municipality
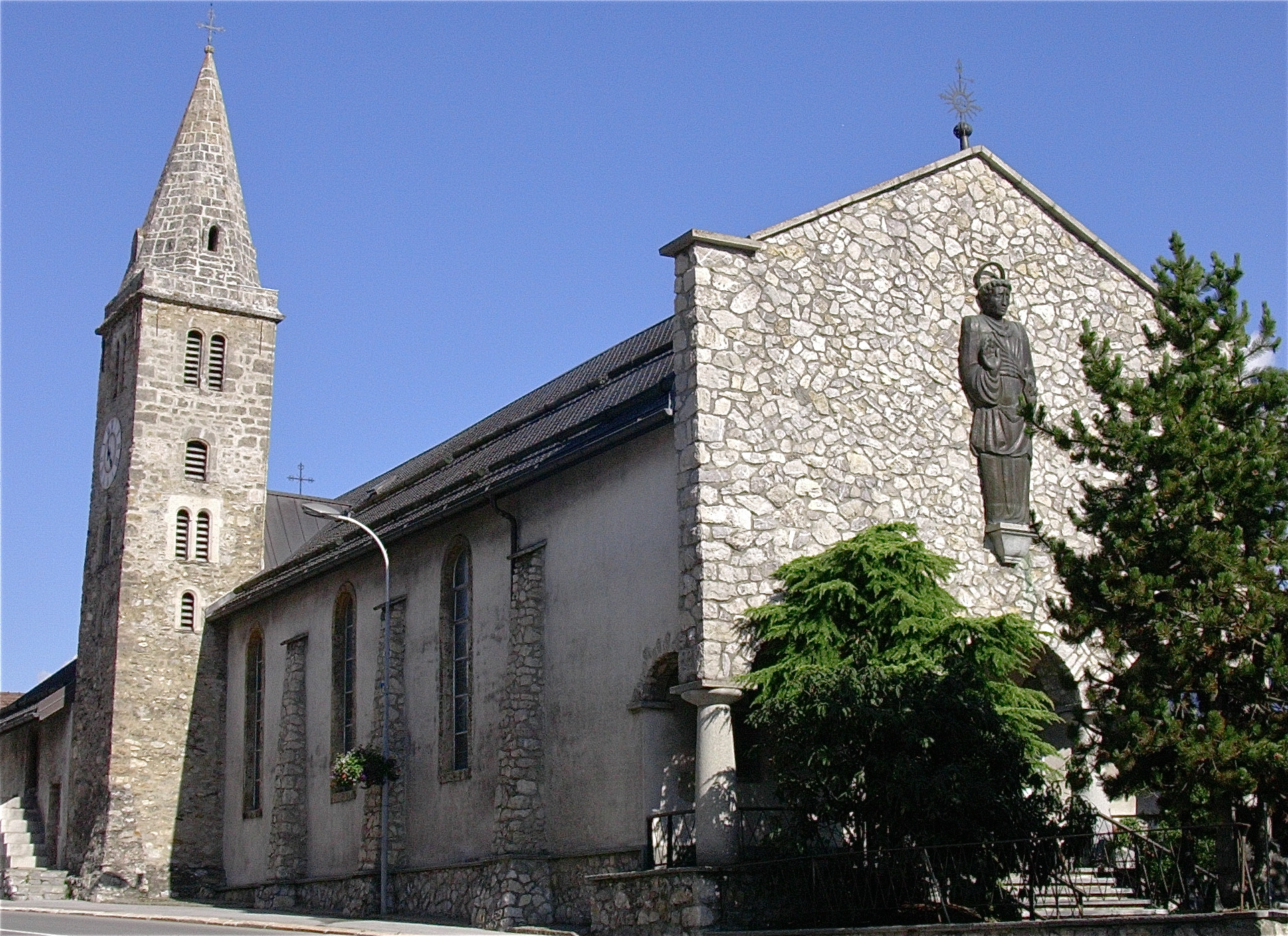

- Flag Coat of arms
- Location of Grimisuat
- Location within Switzerland Location within Canton of Valais
- Coordinates: 46°16′N 7°23′E
- Country: Switzerland
- Canton: Valais
- District: Sion

Government
  - Mayor: Géraldine Marchand-Balet

Area
  - Total: 4.4 km^{2} (1.7 sq mi)
- Elevation: 882 m (2,894 ft)

Population (December 2002)
  - Total: 2,325
  - Density: 530/km^{2} (1,400/sq mi)
- Time zone: UTC+01:00 (CET)
  - Summer (DST): UTC+02:00 (CEST)
- Postal code: 1971
- SFOS number: 6263
- ISO 3166 code: CH-VS
- Surrounded by: Arbaz, Ayent, Savièse, Sion
- Website: www.grimisuat.ch

Grimisuat is a municipality in the district of Sion in the canton of Valais in Switzerland.

== History ==
Grimisuat is first mentioned around 1001–1100 as Grimisoch. The municipality was formerly known by its unknown name Grimslen, however, that name is no longer used.

== Geography ==
Grimisuat has an area, as of 2009, of 4.4 square kilometers (1.7 mi^{2}). Of this area, 2.1 km^{2} (0.81 mi^{2}) or 47.3% is used for agricultural purposes, while 0.99 km^{2} (0.38 mi^{2}) or 22.3% is forested. Of the rest of the land, 1.23 km^{2} (0.47 mi^{2}) or 27.7% is settled (buildings or roads), 0.04 km^{2} (9.9 acres) or 0.9% is either rivers or lakes and 0.09 km^{2} (22 acres) or 2.0% is unproductive land.

Of the built-up area, housing and buildings made up 19.6% and transportation infrastructure made up 5.2%. While parks, green belts and sports fields made up 1.4%. Out of the forested land, 13.5% of the total land area is heavily forested and 8.8% is covered with orchards or small clusters of trees. Of the agricultural land, 0.9% is used for growing crops and 18.0% is pastures, while 28.4% is used for orchards or vine crops. Of the water in the municipality, 0.2% is in lakes and 0.7% is in rivers and streams.

The municipality is located in the Sion district, on the right bank of the Rhone river. It consists of the village of Grimisuat and the hamlets of Comera and Les Combes.

== Coat of arms ==
The blazon of the municipal coat of arms is Gules, a Fleur-de-lys Argent between in chief two Mullets of Six Or.

== Demographics ==
Grimisuat has a population (as of December 2020) of 3,584. As of 2008, 11.5% of the population are resident foreign nationals. Over the last 10 years (2000–2010), the population has changed at a rate of 23.6%. It has changed at 13.9% due to migration and at 7.7% due to births and deaths.

Most of the population (as of 2000) speaks French (2,128 or 91.3%) as their first language, German is the second most common (95 or 4.1%) and Portuguese is the third (42 or 1.8%). There are 25 people who speak Italian.

As of 2008, the population was 51.5% male and 48.5% female. The population was made up of 1,258 Swiss men (45.1% of the population) and 177 (6.4%) non-Swiss men. There were 1,176 Swiss women (42.2%) and 176 (6.3%) non-Swiss women. Of the population in the municipality, 946, or about 40.6%, were born in Grimisuat and lived there in 2000. There were 781, or 33.5%, who were born in the same canton, while 284, or 12.2%, were born somewhere else in Switzerland, and 288, or 12.4%, were born outside of Switzerland.

As of 2000, children and teenagers (0–19 years old) make up 27.4% of the population, while adults (20–64 years old) make up 58.3% and seniors (over 64 years old) make up 14.3%.

As of 2000, there were 949 people who were single and never married in the municipality. There were 1,189 married individuals, 110 widows or widowers and 83 individuals who are divorced.

As of 2000, there were 834 private households in the municipality, and an average of 2.6 persons per household. There were 185 households that consisted of only one person and 78 households with five or more people. In 2000, a total of 819 apartments (85.9% of the total) were permanently occupied, while 96 apartments (10.1%) were seasonally occupied and 38 apartments (4.0%) were empty. As of 2009, the construction rate of new housing units was 17.6 new units per 1000 residents. The vacancy rate for the municipality, in 2010, was 0.17%.

The historical population is given in the following chart:

== Politics ==
In the 2007 federal election the most popular party was the CVP which received 51.71% of the vote. The next three most popular parties were the SP (14.87%), the FDP (11.11%) and the SVP (11%). In the federal election, a total of 1,331 votes were cast, and the voter turnout was 72.8%.

In the 2009 Conseil d'État/Staatsrat election a total of 1,115 votes were cast, of which 97, or about 8.7%, were invalid. The voter participation was 61.0%, which is much more than the cantonal average of 54.67%. In the 2007 Swiss Council of States election a total of 1,308 votes were cast, of which 97, or about 7.4%, were invalid. The voter participation was 72.5%, which is much more than the cantonal average of 59.88%.

== Economy ==
As of 2010, Grimisuat had an unemployment rate of 4.6%. As of 2008, there were 114 people employed in the primary economic sector and about 52 businesses involved in this sector. 80 people were employed in the secondary sector and there were 27 businesses in this sector. 375 people were employed in the tertiary sector, with 56 businesses in this sector. There were 1,076 residents of the municipality who were employed in some capacity, of which females made up 41.8% of the workforce.

In 2008 the total number of full-time equivalent jobs was 413. The number of jobs in the primary sector was 65, all of which were in agriculture. The number of jobs in the secondary sector was 69 of which 20 or (29.0%) were in manufacturing and 49, or 71.0%, were in construction. The number of jobs in the tertiary sector was 279. In the tertiary sector, 59, or 21.1%, were in wholesale or retail sales or the repair of motor vehicles, 14 or 5.0% were in the movement and storage of goods, 30 or 10.8% were in a hotel or restaurant, 1 was in the information industry, 4 or 1.4% were in the insurance or financial industry, 21 or 7.5% were technical professionals or scientists, 31 or 11.1% were in education and 87 or 31.2% were in health care.

In 2000, there were 213 workers who commuted into the municipality and 807 workers who commuted away. The municipality is a net exporter of workers, with about 3.8 workers leaving the municipality for every one entering. Of the working population, 8.2% used public transportation to get to work, and 78.5% used a private car.

== Religion ==
From the 2000 census, 1,985 or 85.2% were Roman Catholic, while 138 or 5.9% belonged to the Swiss Reformed Church. Of the rest of the population, there were 3 members of an Orthodox church (or about 0.13% of the population), there were 4 individuals (or about 0.17% of the population) who belonged to the Christian Catholic Church, and there were 26 individuals (or about 1.12% of the population) who belonged to another Christian church. There were 28 (or about 1.20% of the population) who were Islamic. 86 (or about 3.69% of the population) belonged to no church, are agnostic or atheist, and 73 individuals (or about 3.13% of the population) did not answer the question.

== Education ==
In Grimisuat about 782, or (33.5%), of the population have completed non-mandatory upper secondary education, and 330 or (14.2%) have completed additional higher education (either university or a Fachhochschule). Of the 330 who completed tertiary schooling, 64.8% were Swiss men, 24.2% were Swiss women, 5.2% were non-Swiss men and 5.8% were non-Swiss women.

As of 2000, there were 82 students in Grimisuat who came from another municipality, while 203 residents attended schools outside the municipality.

Grimisuat is home to the Bibliothèque/Médiathèque Communale library. The library has (as of 2008) 11,763 books or other media and loaned out 28,140 items in the same year. It was open a total of 182 days with an average of 12 hours per week during that year.
