= Sion, Switzerland =

Sion
- Municipality
- Sion as seen from Nax, Mont-Noble

- Flag Coat of arms
- Location of Sion
- Location within Switzerland Location within Canton of Valais
- Coordinates: 46°13′52″N 7°21′34″E
- Country: Switzerland
- Canton: Valais
- District: Sion

Government
  - Executive: Conseil municipal with 9 members
  - Mayor: Président (list); Phillippe Varone FDP/PRD/PLR (as of November 2016)
  - Parliament: Conseil général with 60 members

Area
  - Total: 34.86 km^{2} (13.46 sq mi)
- Elevation (gare): 491 m (1,611 ft)

Population (December 2020)
  - Total: 34,978
  - Density: 1,003/km^{2} (2,599/sq mi)
- Demonyms: French: Sédunois(e); German: Sittener(in)
- Time zone: UTC+01:00 (CET)
  - Summer (DST): UTC+02:00 (CEST)
- Postal codes: 1950 Sion, 1958 02 Uvrier, 1962 Pont-de-la-Morge (Sion), 1967 Bramois, 1991 00 Salins, 1991 02 Arvillard (Salins), 1991 03 Pravidondaz (Salins), 1991 04 Turin (Salins), 1991 05 Misériez (Salins), 1992 00 Les Agettes, 1992 01 Les Mayens-de-Sion, 1992 02 La Vernaz (Les Agettes), 1992 03 Crête-à-l'Oeil (Les Agettes), 1993 Veysonnaz
- SFOS number: 6266
- ISO 3166 code: CH-VS
- Surrounded by: Ayent, Conthey, Grimisuat, Grône, Mont-Noble, Nendaz, Saint-Léonard, Savièse, Vex
- Website: www.sion.ch

Sion (French pronunciation: [sjɔ̃]; German: Sitten [ˈzɪtn̩]; former Italian: Seduno; Latin: Sedunum) is a Swiss town situated in the Rhône valley, a municipality, and the capital of the canton of Valais and of the district of Sion. As of December 2020 it had a population of 34,978 (known as Sédunois(es)).

On 17 January 1968, the former municipality of Bramois merged into the municipality of Sion. On 1 January 2013, the former municipality of Salins merged into the municipality of Sion, and on 1 January 2017, Les Agettes did the same.

Landmarks in Sion include the Basilique de Valère and the Château de Tourbillon. Sion has an airfield for civilian and military use, which serves as a base for air rescue missions.

== History ==
=== Prehistoric settlement ===
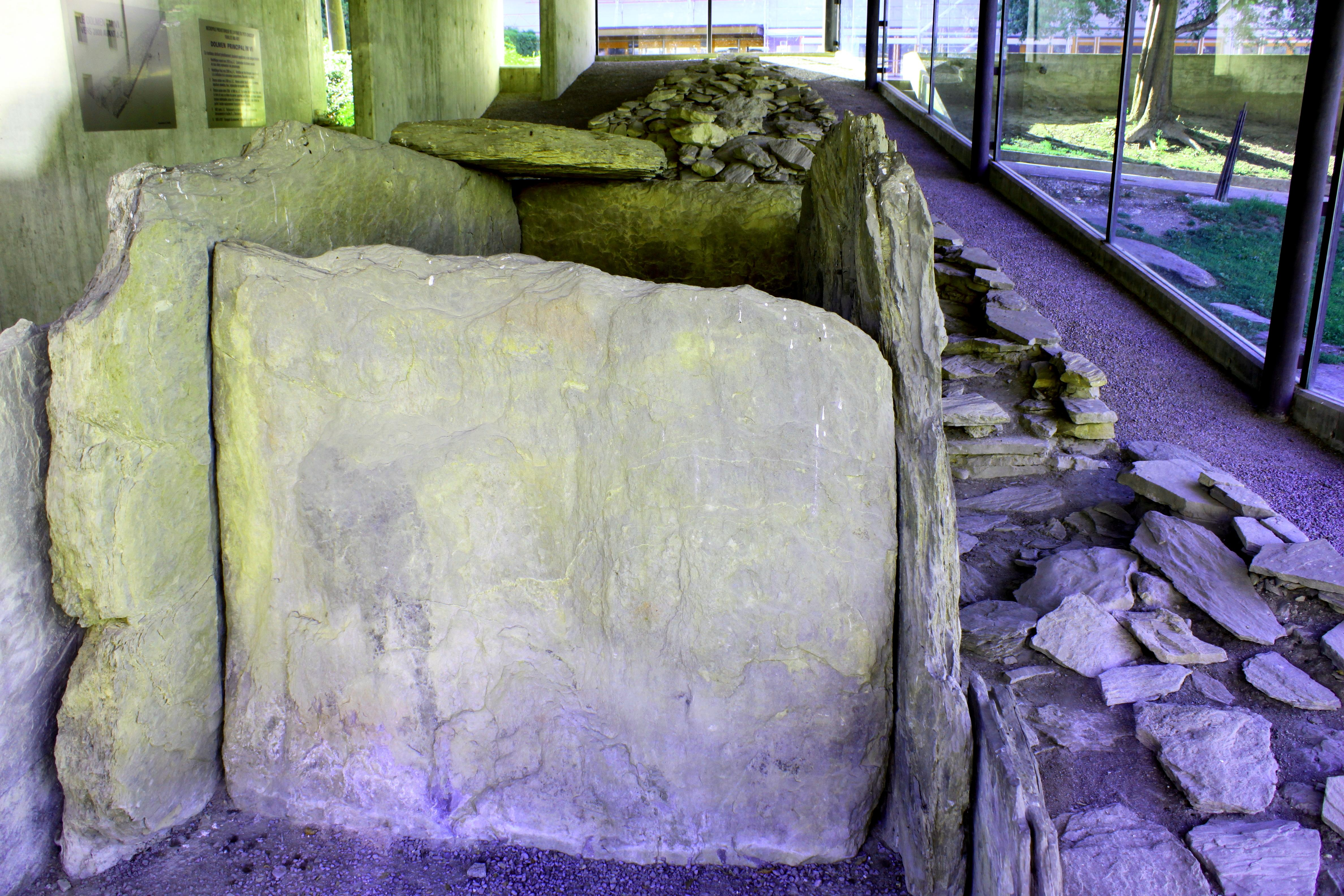
Necropolis at Le Petit-Chasseur

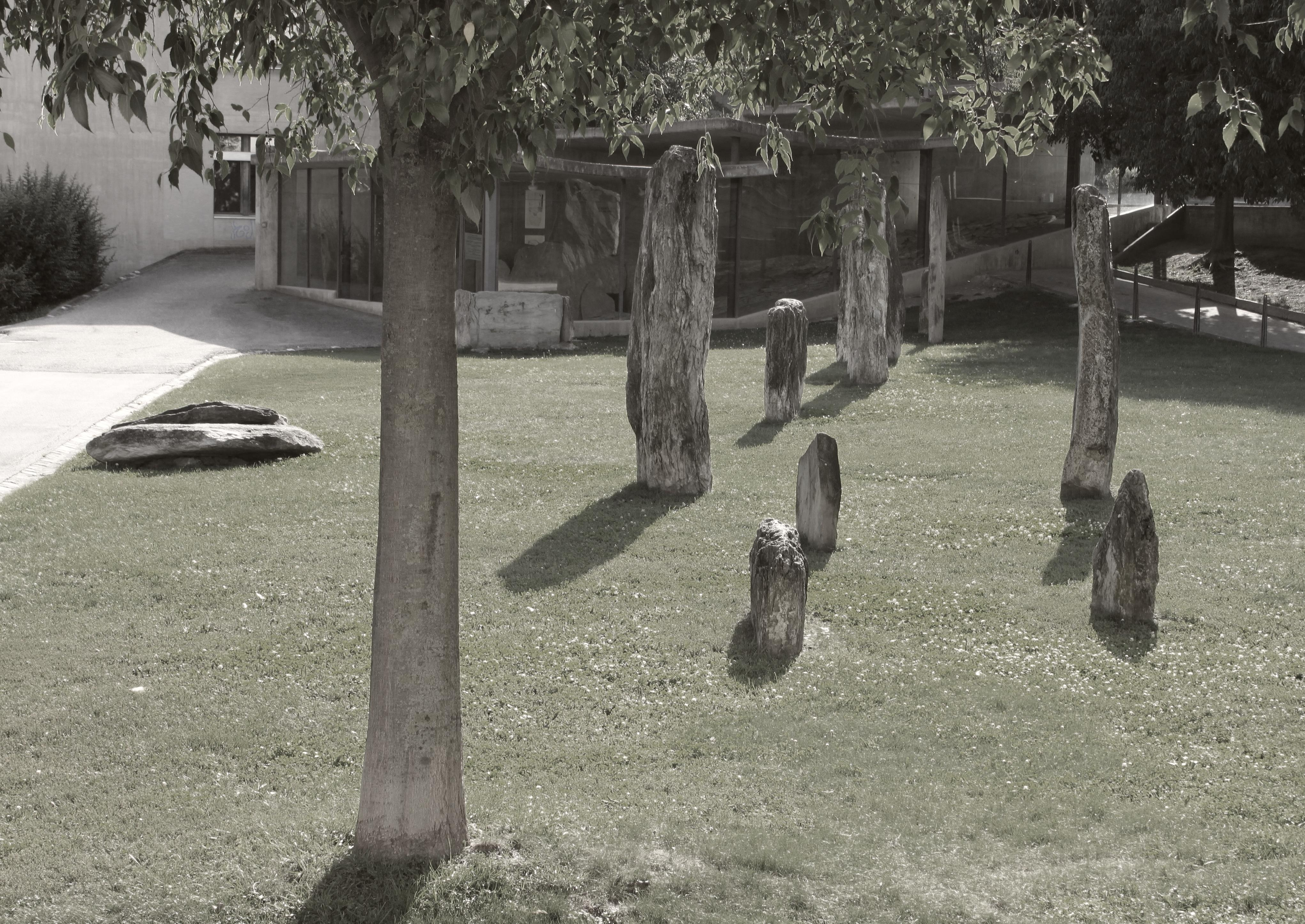
Menhir at Le Petit-Chasseur

Sion is one of the most important prehistoric sites in Europe. The alluvial fan of the river Sionne, the rocky slopes above the river and, to a lesser extent, Valeria and Tourbillon hills have been settled nearly continuously since antiquity. The oldest trace of human settlement comes from 6200 BC during the late Mesolithic. Around 5800 BC early Neolithic farmers from the Mediterranean settled in Sion. The settlements remained small until about 4500 BC, during the middle Neolithic, when the number of settlements increased sharply. To support the population increase, farming and grazing spread throughout the valley. They also began burying their dead in Chablandes-type stone burial cists with engraved anthropomorphic stelae. The individual graves changed at the beginning of the 3rd millennium BC in large, dry stone wall communal tombs (such as the Dolmen of Le Petit-Chasseur). During the Beaker culture period in the second half of the third Millennium, dolmens were built once again, but they were smaller and had no podium. Stelae continued to be carved, though these were rich with geometric patterns and sometimes built out of old dolmen. At the beginning of the Early Bronze Age (around 2300 BC) the last stelae were erected.

The early settlements have been well documented. There are huts from the Middle Neolithic period found near Le Petit Chasseur and under Ritz Avenue. Late Neolithic sites have been found at Bramois and the early Early Bronze Age site is at Le Petit Chasseur. The Middle Bronze Age, however, is poorly documented. From the subsequent epochs, the great necropolis of Don Bosco (the "aristocrat" tumulus of the Late Bronze Age and Iron Age) and the necropolis of Sous-le-Scex from the La Tène culture.

=== Celtic and Roman town ===
At the end of the 1st century BC, Sion was the capital of the Seduni, one of the four Celtic tribes of the Valais. Julius Caesar mentions them as Nantuates Sedunos Veragrosque. They were conquered by the Romans in the 10s BC. By 8–7 BC, Emperor Augustus praised the tribe (civitas) of the Seduni with an inscription. The town-hall is said to contain several Roman inscriptions, one of which found at Sion commemorates the Roman presence: Civitas Sedunorum Patrono. Under the Romans it was known as Sedunum.

The Roman settlement stretched mainly from what is now St. Theodul, between the Sionne and to the west side of the hill, Valeria. Under the church, a large bath complex was discovered and partially excavated. Near La Sitterie, Sous-le-Scex and in the upper part of the Avenue du Petit Chasseur, portions of several villae suburbanae were found. In the 1st century AD, the Claudii Vallensium Forum, in what is now Martigny, became the capital of the civitas Vallensium. Sedunum lost political importance, but still remained the home of many notable families. Grave stelae attest to the presence of duumviri (magistrates of the civitas), of flamines (priests of the imperial cult), a Roman knight and a former consul in the town. In the 4th century praesides (provincial governors) are mentioned living in Sedunum, including a man named Pontius Asclepiodotus, who rebuilt an imperial building and, according to an inscription, converted to Christianity in 377.

=== Seat of a Catholic bishop ===
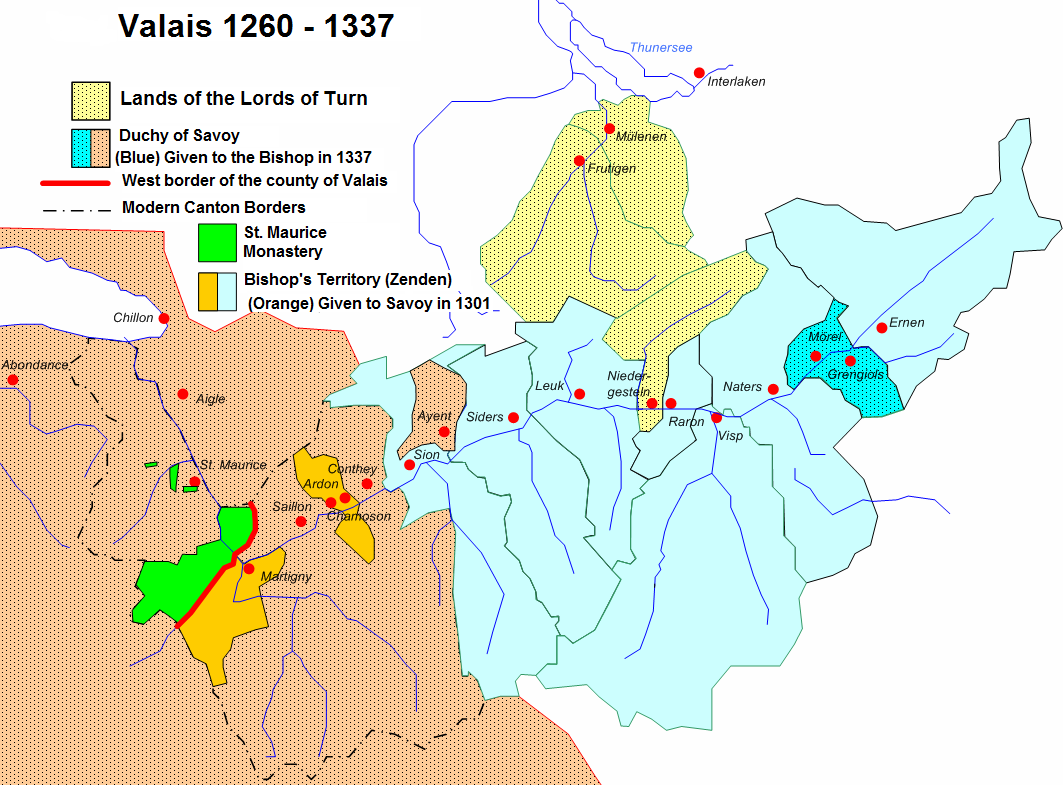
Valais between 1260 and 1337

The Roman Catholic diocese of Sion is the oldest in Switzerland and one of the oldest north of the Alps. At first, the see was sited at Octodurum, now called Martigny/Martinach. The first authentically historical bishop was Saint Theodore or Theodolus (died 391), who was present at the Council of Aquileia in 381. He founded the Abbey of Saint-Maurice in Agaunum, with a small church in honor of Saint Maurice, martyred there c. 300, when he united the local hermits in a common life, thus beginning the Abbey of Saint-Maurice, the oldest north of the Alps. Theodore rebuilt the church at Sion, which had been destroyed by Emperor Maximinus at the beginning of the 4th century. At first the new diocese was a suffragan of the archdiocese of Vienne; later it became suffragan of Tarentaise.

In 589 the bishop, St. Heliodorus, transferred the see to Sion, leaving the low-lying, flood-prone site of Octodurum, where the Drance joins the Rhône. Though frequently the early bishops were also the abbots of Saint-Maurice, the community of canons was jealously watchful that the bishops should not extend their jurisdiction over the abbey. Several of the bishops united both offices: Wilcharius (764–780), previously archbishop of Vienne, whence he had been driven by the Moors; Saint Alteus, who received from the pope a bull of exemption in favor of the abbey (780); Aimo II, son of Count Humbert I of Savoy, who entertained Leo IX at Saint-Maurice in 1049.

The first cathedral probably dates from the 6th century. It was halfway up the hill, where later the church of St. Peter stood, until the 19th century when that church was demolished.

The fortunes of the city grew when the bishop settled there. In 999, King Rodolphe III of Burgundy granted the entire County of Valais to the bishop, and Sion became the capital of this county. The prince-bishop had the rights of high and low justice, the right to his own regalia and to appoint his own vassals. The residents of Sion were ruled by three appointees of the bishop, the maior, the vice dominus or Viztum and the salterus.

=== Medieval Sion ===
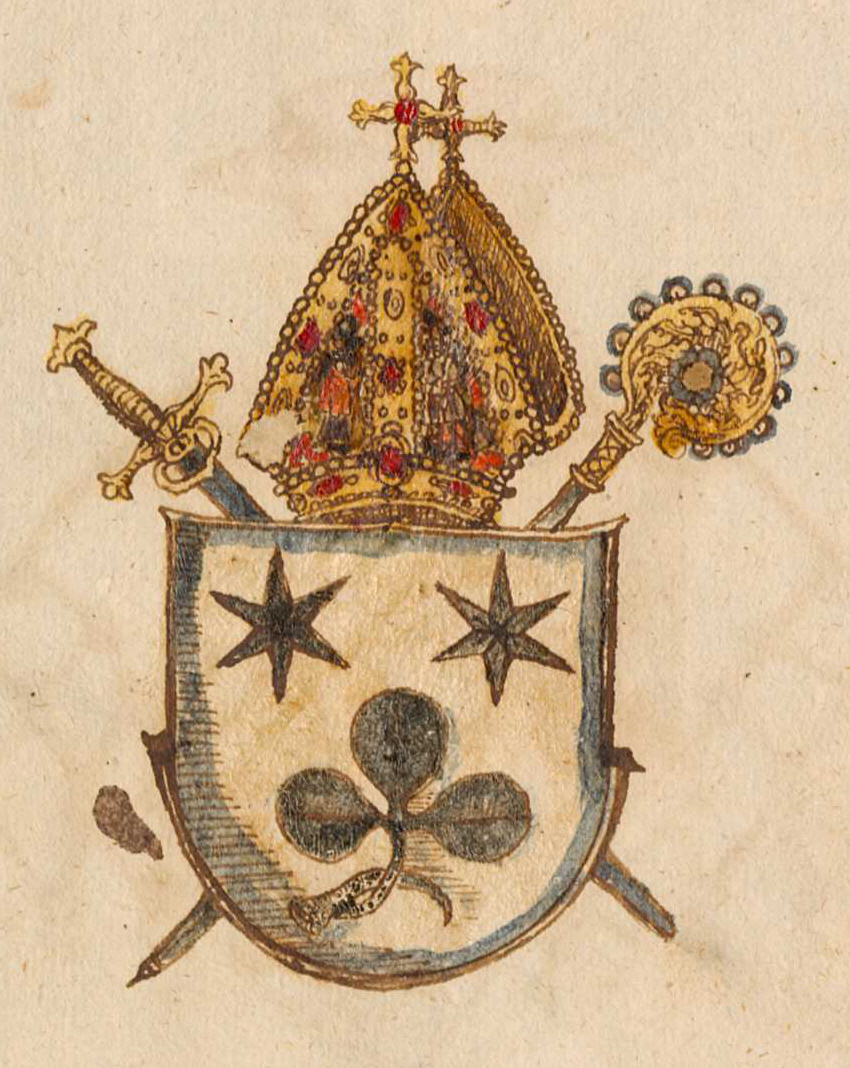
Coat of arms of Hildebrand Riedmatten, Bishop of Sion in 1594

As a result of the decline of the feudal social order and thanks to privileges and concessions granted by the bishop, the citizens of Sion had a limited independence in the Middle Ages. A contract between Bishop Kuno and his maior William of Turn from 1179, is seen as the first step in the creation of an independent city government. An agreement between the bishop, the collegiate church of St. Viztums and William of Turn in 1217 is the first written charter of freedom for the city. It includes civil and criminal laws and punishments as well as trade and market regulations. In 1269, the burghers of the town had their own council with its own statutes. The council governed the use and management of the common lands through twelve councilors led by the Viztum. These administrators later became syndics and were known by this title in 1323. In 1338, the vicar general confirmed the existing rights and freedom of the citizens of Sion in a document. The document was renewed by the bishop in 1339 and was presented to each successive bishop to reconfirm after his election. In the same year, Emperor Louis the Bavarian raised Sion to a free imperial city and collected the surrounding lands into a barony. In 1346, the episcopal Viztum and the citizenry collectively wrote the police regulations. Sion was now a city with city walls, documented freedoms and the market right.

=== From the Late Middle Ages to the end of the ancien régime ===
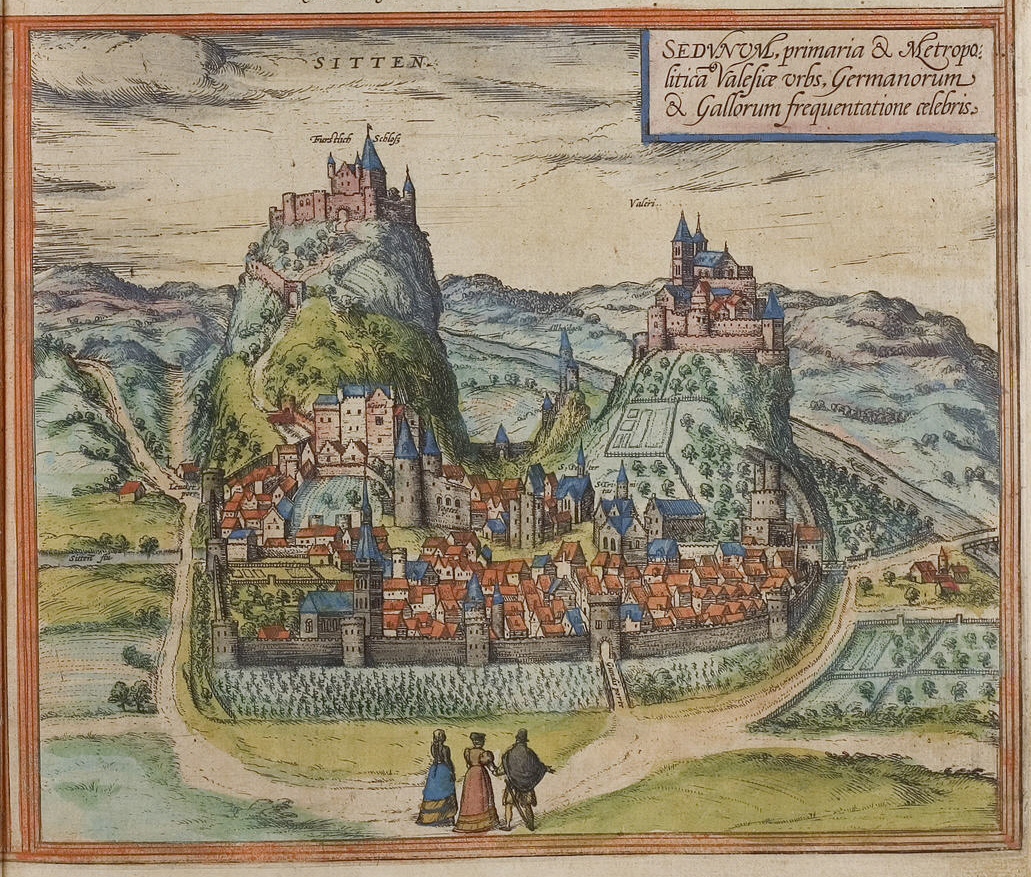
Sion in 1572, from Beschreibung vnd Contrafactur der vornembster Stät der Welt, Cologne 1582

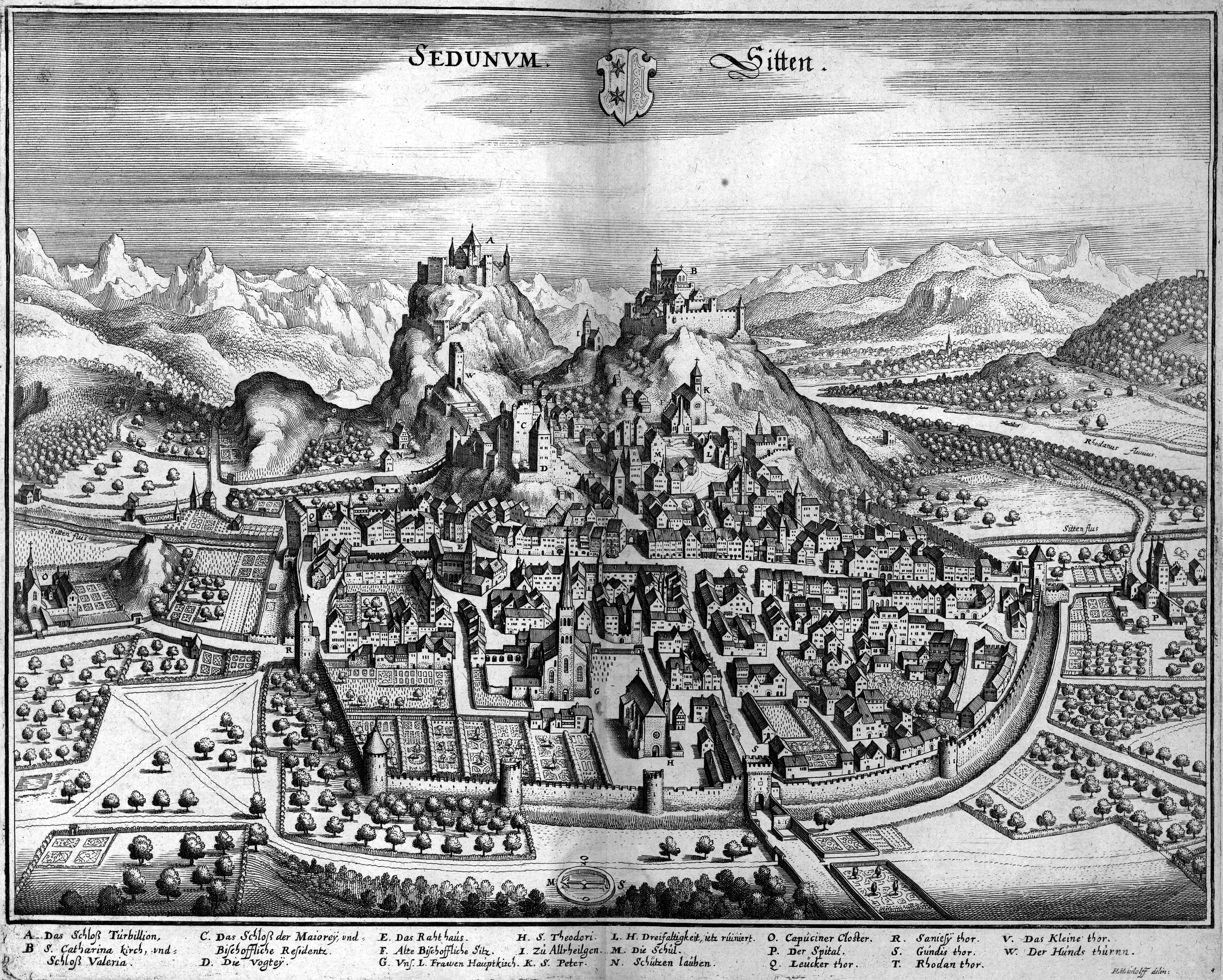
Sion in 1640, from Topographia Helvetiae, Rhaetiae et Valesiae, 1642

From the middle of the 14th century to 1475, the history of Sion was filled with wars and destruction. Bishop Witschard Tavel tried to reduce the privileges of the cathedral collegiate chapter and the citizenry with the support of the Count of Savoy. In 1352, Sion was conquered, pillaged and plundered by an army from Savoy. In 1373, the bishop bought back the majority of the fief of Sion from the de Greysier family. Majorie Castle became the bishop's residence and the maior was now appointed by the bishop every year. Sion was attacked and looted in 1384, again during the Raron affair in 1418 and finally in 1475 during the Burgundian Wars.

During this period, the citizenry strove to defend their acquired privileges and whenever possible to expand those rights. In 1414, the city council approved a new set of statutes for the citizens. In 1433, Bishop Andreas dei Benzi approved a strict set of regulations concerning the granting of citizenship rights to applicants. Two years later, in 1435, he allowed the city council to appoint the bishop's representative to Sion. He retained only the right to approve or reject the council's choice. In 1560, the citizenry bought the office of Viztum from the feudal landholder, the de Chevron family. A year earlier the bishop assigned the office of salterus to the citizenry. Thus, by the mid 16th century, the city enjoyed a nearly total autonomy.

In the 16th century, due to a strong immigration from the German-speaking Upper Valais, Sion/Sitten became almost totally German speaking. The town council minutes were written in Latin until 1540, when they changed to German. Official invoices changed to German in 1600.

The 17th and 18th centuries were a peaceful time in Sion. The new city hall was built on Grand-Pont between 1657 and 1665. In 1788, a fire broke out in the city. It damaged Majoria and Tourbillon castles and destroyed 115 of the 284 inhabited houses.

In the High Middle Ages, the residents of Sion were homines episcopi or people of the bishop. This was true both for the staff at the court as well as the serfs who tilled the land, and the craftsmen and traders. As the civic community gradually began to organize, they were no longer willing to automatically grant every new arrival the same rights as citizens. Those who were unwilling or unable to purchase citizenship, which cost about 60 shillings in 1326, but wished to live in Sion were classed as permanent residents and their descendants held the same status until they could buy their citizenship. The permanent residents were mainly workers, craftsmen (often originating from the Swiss Confederation and the Germanies) and traders (mostly from Savoy and northern Italy). An outbreak of the plague in 1348 wiped out many citizens. In addition to the citizens' deaths, the restrictive attitude of the citizenry toward new members led to citizens becoming a minority in Sion. In the first population census in 1610 the town had 1,835 inhabitants, of whom 412 were citizens and 1,423 were permanent residents. In the 18th century, a third category, the tollerati, was added. On the eve of the revolution the city's population was 19% citizen, 30% permanent resident and 51% tollerati and other marginalized groups. There were only 41 citizen families, of which twelve were nobility and nine belonged to the patrician class.

Starting in the 13th century and the first half of the 14th century, long-distance trade began to pick up from northern Italy via the Simplon Pass and through the Valais into the Champagne region. Sion became an important relay station on this route. The station at Sion included a Sust or warehouse that also provided additional animals to help haul wagons over the pass. Many local nobles and farmers were involved in animal husbandry to support the Sust and pastured their animals, during the summer, in pastures on the other side of the Rhône. The Sust's barns are stables were still in operation until the 19th century. Along the river Sionne, there were mills, sawmills and other industries that needed water power. In addition, there were many tanneries in the same area. In 1466, the smiths, bricklayers and stonemasons' guilds arose from an ecclesiastical fraternity. Those three guilds were followed by the butchers' guild in 1512, the bakers' guild in 1525, the tailors and drapers' guild in 1527 and in 1602 the guild of shoemakers and tanners. These guilds played a major economic role in Sion until the end of the Ancien Régime. The Inn of the White Cross opened in 1550 for merchants and wealthy travelers, followed in 1688 by the inn of the Golden Lion, which was built beside the town hall.

Very little is known about the early churches in Sion since written sources are meager before the 12th century. The predecessor of the present cathedral, the church of Notre-Dame-du-Glarier in the Palacio district served both as the bishop's church and the parish church in the 12th century. It was destroyed in the 14th century during one of the wars between the bishop of Sion and the House of Savoy. It was rebuilt in the second half of the 15th century. In the meantime, St. Peter's church took over as the bishop's and parish church. It was demolished in 1806. The Valeria Church was built in the 11th century and originally consecrated to St. Catherine. This church was probably the first church for the cathedral chapter. St. Theoduls church was first mentioned in the 13th century. It was probably built in 1100 on the ruins of Roman baths and a Carolingian era church. This church was probably built as a grave and pilgrimage church with a shrine in Theodul's Crypt. It was destroyed in the wars with the House of Savoy in the 14th century. Construction began on a new church in 1510–1516 under Bishop Matthew Schiner and continued until the 17th century. St. Theodul's served the French-speaking urban population as a parish church until 1798. In the 17th century, citizens claimed the right to choose their parish priest, over objections of the ecclesiastical authorities. The dispute eventually required mediation through the Papal Nuncio. The resolution allowed the citizens to choose the pastor from one of four proposed by the archbishop.

In the second half of the 16th century a large Protestant community grew in Sion under the leadership of renowned burghers, who had learned of the new doctrine while students in Bern, Basel, Zürich, Lausanne or Geneva. After 1604, the Valais government had clearly decided to remain part of the old faith. Some individuals or families emigrated to reformed areas, while others went back to the old faith. The Counter-Reformation, led by the Capuchin friars of Savoy and the Jesuits destroyed the last hopes of the Protestants to establish a foothold in the cathedral town. The Capuchins founded a monastery in 1631 and started construction of the monastery church in 1636, and the Jesuits started missionary activity in the 17th century and established a school in 1734.

=== From the Helvetic Republic to 1848 ===
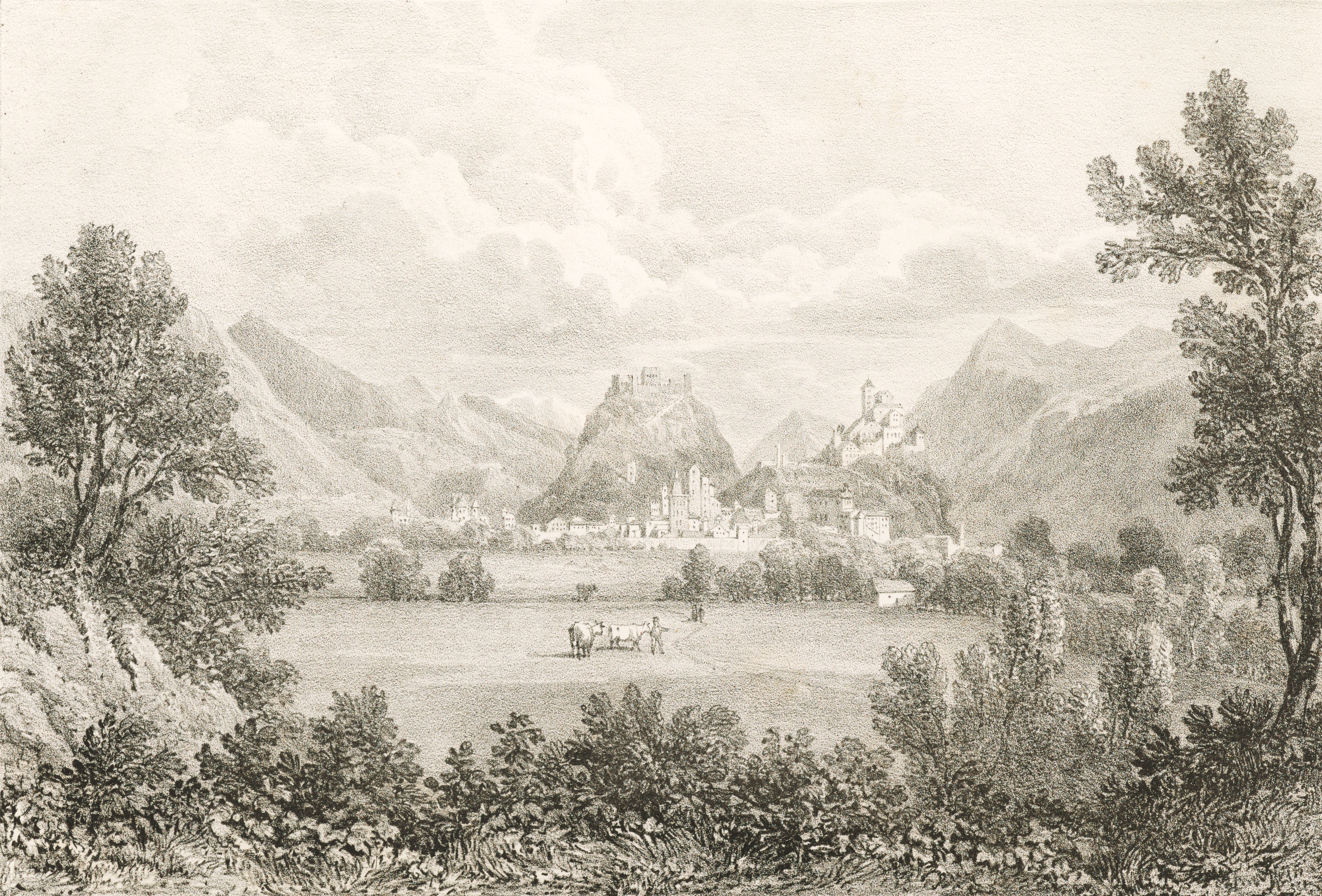
Sion as seen from the west, 1820, lithograph illustrated by James Pattison Cockburn, printed by James Duffield Harding

During the anti-patrician unrest in the Lower Valais at the end of the 18th century, Sion remained a bastion of the aristocracy. The leaders of the Les Crochets conspiracy were executed in 1791 in Sion to avoid riots. After the French invasion of Switzerland on 5 March 1798, Sion was caught between the revolutionary spirit of a portion of its population (who established a liberty pole in town on 10 March) and conservative elements who wanted to prevent any change in the Valais. Following the creation of the Helvetic Republic in May 1798, a counter-revolutionary rebellion erupted in the upper Valais. This short-lived rebellion was crushed on 17 May by French and Vaudois troops and Sion was plundered.

Under the Helvetic Republic, Sion was source of conflict between supporters and opponents of the new regime. In May 1799 counter-revolutionary forces from Upper Valais looted the city again. In order to ensure peace in the Valais, the French General Louis Marie Turreau de Garambouville occupied Sion in 1801 and in 1802 Napoleon Bonaparte declared the independent Rhodanic Republic. It then remained independent until 1810 when it was annexed into France as the département of Simplon. Between 1798 and 1801 the representative of the Helvetic government resided in Sion. Under the French occupation, Joseph du Fay de Lavallaz was appointed by the emperor to be the mayor of the district of Sion.

After Napoleon's defeats during the War of the Sixth Coalition the Valais was occupied by Austria at the end of December 1813. Under the Austrians, the citizenry received many of their rights back. During the following year, the government was split between supporters of the Ancien Régime and the supporters of the independent republic, with each party forming a council. When the two councils combined, the number of Council members was set to 20. Between 1815 and 1839, the patrician class gradually took more and more of the rights and duties of the citizenry back on themselves, gaining more and more power. In response to this, Alexandre de Torrente founded a liberal party in 1830. In the cantonal government, Sion agreed most often with the German-speaking Upper Valais. Which gave the Upper Valais a majority of the Zenden in the council, to the detriment of the French-speaking Lower Valais. However, after the vote on the constitution of 1839, the Upper Valais broke away from the rest of the canton. Sion was chosen as the capital of the Valais, while the breakaway Upper Valais chose Sierre. In 1840, the Upper and Lower Valais were reunited. But four years later, Sion was occupied by Upper Valais troops during the beginning of the Sonderbund War. Federal troops occupied Sion in November 1847.

=== Modern Sion ===
Aerial view (1955)

Sion lost to Turin, Italy in its bid to host the 2006 Winter Olympics. Sion also bid for the 2002 Winter Olympics, which it lost to Salt Lake City, and the 1976 Winter Olympics, which it lost to Denver (the games were reassigned to Innsbruck when Denver residents voted down additional funding). On 10 June 2019, Sion withdrew its bid for the 2026 Winter Olympics after rejection in the referendum.

=== Archaeological findings ===
Archaeologists found six aligned standing stones in La Petit district in Sion in July 2019. These standing stones were found accidentally during the construction work of a residential building, in the same area where 30 such stones and the dolmens were found in 1960.

"This discovery is of prime importance to help us understand social rituals at the end of the Neolithic period (around 2,500BC) in central Europe," was announced from the canton of Valais. According to the press release, a number of stones were noticed to have been intentionally broken.

Three of the standing stones were carved with markings. The largest of the stones assumed to be a male figure wearing geometrically decorated clothes with a sun-like motif around his face is about two tonnes.

== Geography ==
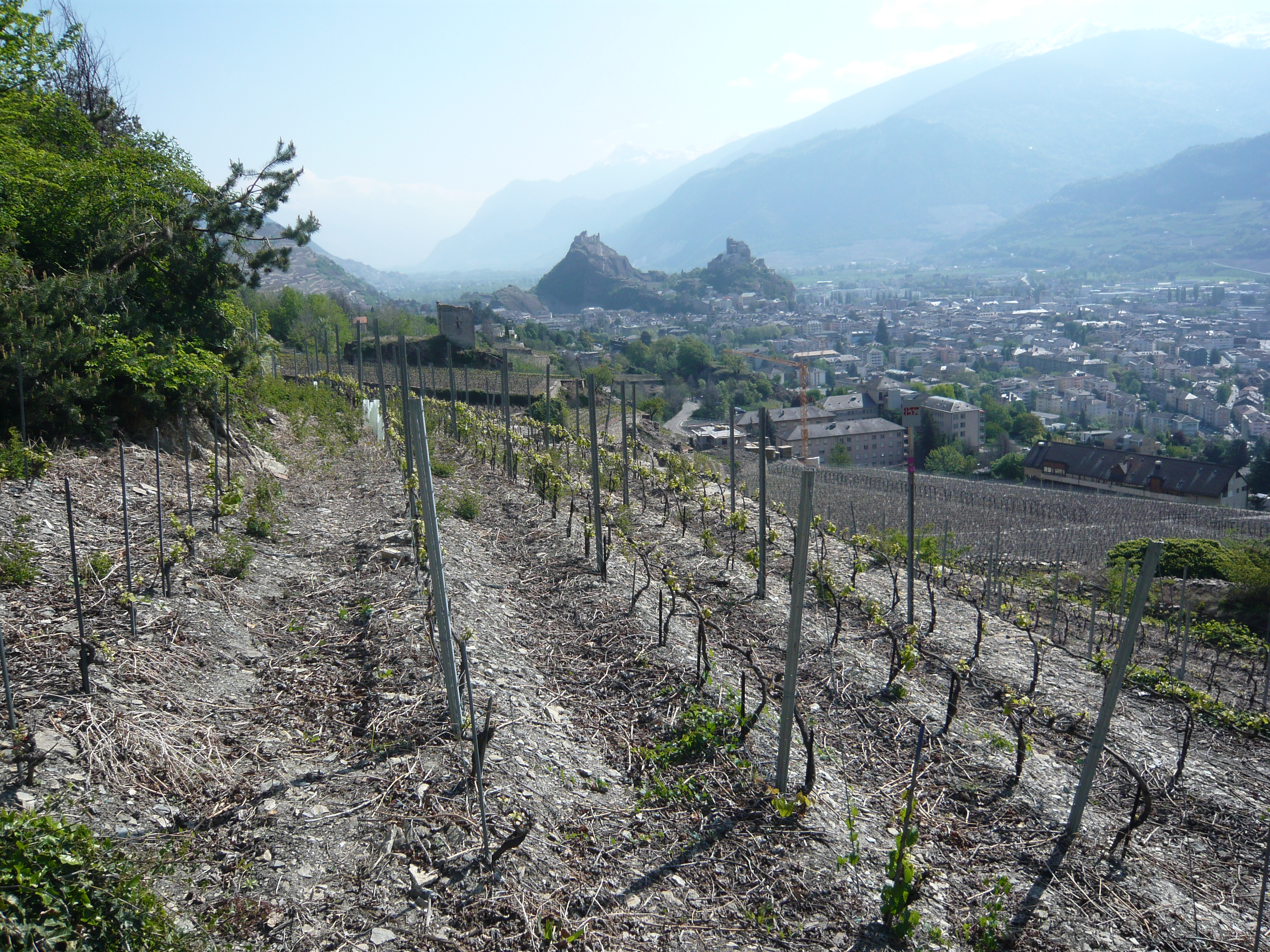
Vineyards outside Sion and Sion town

After the 2017 merger Sion had an area of 34.86 km^{2} (13.46 sq mi).

Before the merger Sion had an area (as of the September 2004 survey) of 29.69 square kilometers (11.46 sq mi). Of this area, about 38.9% is used for agricultural purposes, while 15.5% is forested. Of the rest of the land, 38.4% is settled (buildings or roads) and 7.2% is unproductive land. In the 2004/09 survey a total of 505 ha (1,250 acres) or about 17.0% of the total area was covered with buildings, an increase of 148 ha (370 acres) over the 1980 amount. Over the same time period, the amount of recreational space in the municipality increased by 66 ha (160 acres) and is now about 4.47% of the total area. Of the agricultural land, 859 ha (2,120 acres) is used for orchards and vineyards, 337 ha (830 acres) is fields and grasslands and 17 ha (42 acres) consists of alpine grazing areas. Since 1980 the amount of agricultural land has decreased by 330 ha (820 acres). Over the same time period the amount of forested land has increased by 8 ha (20 acres). Rivers and lakes cover 164 ha (410 acres) in the municipality.

The Medieval chroniclers report the occurrence of severe flood events, and during the Little Ice Age (or LIA, 1350–1850 AD) the Upper Rhône had certainly a torrential regime as other rivers in the Western Alps. During the second half of the nineteenth century, the anthropogenic activities had a crucial impact on the Rhône basin. The river was channelized twice in the periods of 1863–1894 and 1930–1960 (the so-called ‘Corrections of the Rhone’, which reduced the length of the river and gave to the river the present-day aspect. In the 2000s, after severe flood events, the ‘Third Correction’ began following the ‘Room-for-River’ flood management strategy and aims to: (1) widen the river, (2) increase the capacity, (3) secure levees and (4) improve the general environmental quality.

=== Climate ===
One of the driest and sunniest areas of Switzerland, Sion has an average of 82.1 days of rain or snow per year and on average receives 603 mm (23.7 in) of precipitation. The wettest month is December during which time Sion receives an average of 64 mm (2.5 in) of rain or snow. During this month there is precipitation for an average of 7.4 days. The month with the most days of precipitation is August, with an average of 7.9, but with only 57 mm (2.2 in) of rain. The driest month of the year is April with an average of 35 mm (1.4 in) of precipitation over 5.2 days. According to the Köppen Climate Classification system, Sion has a (warm humid) temperate climate, abbreviated "Cfb" on climate maps.

Climate data for Sion, elevation 482 m (1,581 ft), (1991–2020 normals, extremes 1962–present)
Month	Jan	Feb	Mar	Apr	May	Jun	Jul	Aug	Sep	Oct	Nov	Dec	Year
Record high °C (°F)	16.8 (62.2)	21.4 (70.5)	24.9 (76.8)	29.6 (85.3)	35.1 (95.2)	37.0 (98.6)	38.0 (100.4)	37.6 (99.7)	34.0 (93.2)	27.6 (81.7)	20.7 (69.3)	17.5 (63.5)	38.0 (100.4)
Mean daily maximum °C (°F)	5.0 (41.0)	7.6 (45.7)	13.5 (56.3)	17.6 (63.7)	21.5 (70.7)	25.4 (77.7)	27.4 (81.3)	26.6 (79.9)	22.1 (71.8)	16.9 (62.4)	10.1 (50.2)	5.1 (41.2)	16.6 (61.9)
Daily mean °C (°F)	0.5 (32.9)	2.3 (36.1)	7.2 (45.0)	11.3 (52.3)	15.3 (59.5)	19.0 (66.2)	20.6 (69.1)	19.9 (67.8)	15.7 (60.3)	10.7 (51.3)	5.0 (41.0)	0.9 (33.6)	10.7 (51.3)
Mean daily minimum °C (°F)	−3.0 (26.6)	−1.9 (28.6)	1.9 (35.4)	5.3 (41.5)	9.4 (48.9)	13.0 (55.4)	14.5 (58.1)	14.1 (57.4)	10.4 (50.7)	6.1 (43.0)	1.1 (34.0)	−2.4 (27.7)	5.7 (42.3)
Record low °C (°F)	−20.6 (−5.1)	−18.4 (−1.1)	−14.0 (6.8)	−5.5 (22.1)	−2.0 (28.4)	0.0 (32.0)	2.9 (37.2)	3.9 (39.0)	0.5 (32.9)	−4.6 (23.7)	−13.4 (7.9)	−18.0 (−0.4)	−20.6 (−5.1)
Average precipitation mm (inches)	51.8 (2.04)	40.4 (1.59)	36.9 (1.45)	33.7 (1.33)	52.0 (2.05)	48.2 (1.90)	61.9 (2.44)	59.6 (2.35)	37.6 (1.48)	42.8 (1.69)	50.4 (1.98)	67.7 (2.67)	583.0 (22.95)
Average snowfall cm (inches)	9.0 (3.5)	8.7 (3.4)	1.9 (0.7)	0.2 (0.1)	0.0 (0.0)	0.0 (0.0)	0.0 (0.0)	0.0 (0.0)	0.0 (0.0)	0.1 (0.0)	5.8 (2.3)	17.3 (6.8)	43.0 (16.9)
Average precipitation days (≥ 1.0 mm)	7.0	5.6	5.9	5.2	7.5	7.4	8.0	8.2	5.8	6.5	6.9	7.5	81.5
Average snowy days (≥ 1.0 cm)	1.9	1.3	0.3	0.1	0.0	0.0	0.0	0.0	0.0	0.0	0.7	2.4	6.7
Average relative humidity (%)	78	71	62	59	62	62	63	67	71	76	78	80	69
Mean monthly sunshine hours	93.4	130.8	188.0	210.0	229.2	254.2	271.2	249.7	207.8	159.7	95.5	68.4	2,157.9
Percentage possible sunshine	53	58	60	59	56	61	65	65	65	59	50	50	60
Source 1: NOAA
Source 2: MeteoSwiss Infoclimat (extremes)

== Coat of arms ==
Panorama of Sion

The blazon of the municipal coat of arms is Per fess Argent two Mullets of Five Gules and Gules.

== Demographics ==
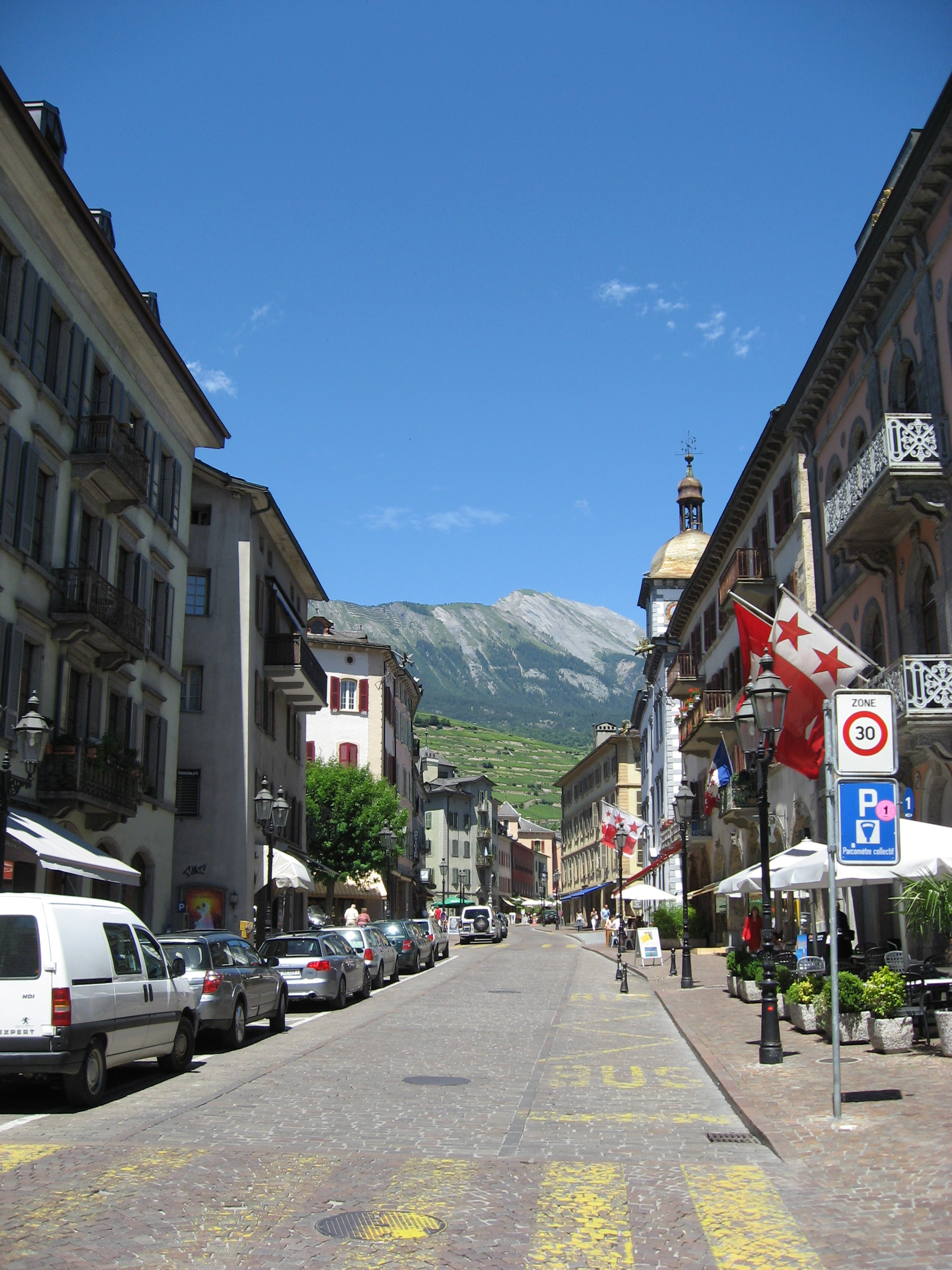
Grand-Pont, street in the town center

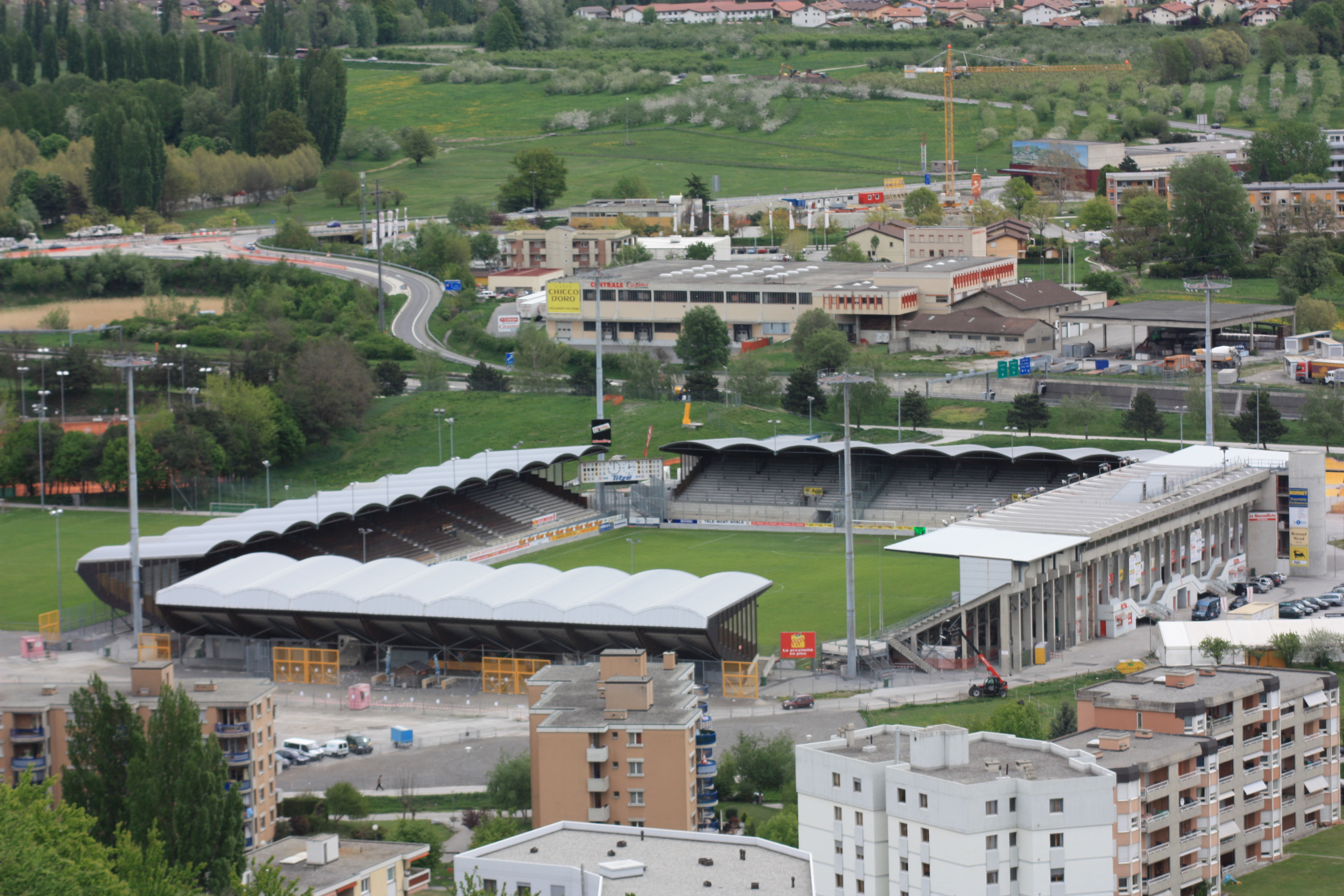
Stadium and apartment buildings in Sion

Sion has a population (as of December 2020) of 34,978. As of 2008, 26.9% of the population are resident foreign nationals. Over years 2000–2010 the population changed at a rate of 10%. It has changed at a rate of 10.1% due to migration and at a rate of 2.3% due to births and deaths.

Most of the population (as of 2000) speaks French (22,338 or 82.2%) as their first language, German is the second most common (1,523 or 5.6%) and Portuguese is the third (912 or 3.4%). There are 855 people who speak Italian and 19 people who speak Romansh.

As of 2008, the population was 47.8% male and 52.2% female. The population was made up of 10,128 Swiss men (34.1% of the population) and 4,089 (13.8%) non-Swiss men. There were 11,642 Swiss women (39.2%) and 3,859 (13.0%) non-Swiss women. Of the population in the municipality, 9,542 or about 35.1% were born in Sion and lived there in 2000. There were 7,481 or 27.5% who were born in the same canton, while 2,939 or 10.8% were born somewhere else in Switzerland, and 6,285 or 23.1% were born outside of Switzerland.

As of 2000, children and teenagers (0–19 years old) make up 24.8% of the population, while adults (20–64 years old) make up 60.7% and seniors (over 64 years old) make up 14.5%.

As of 2000, there were 11,846 people who were single and never married in the municipality. There were 12,335 married individuals, 1,509 widows or widowers and 1,481 individuals who are divorced.

As of 2000, there were 11,326 private households in the municipality, and an average of 2.3 persons per household. There were 4,114 households that consist of only one person and 703 households with five or more people. In 2000, a total of 10,670 apartments (88.3% of the total) were permanently occupied, while 1,072 apartments (8.9%) were seasonally occupied and 345 apartments (2.9%) were empty. As of 2009, the construction rate of new housing units was 4.7 new units per 1000 residents.

As of 2003 the average price to rent an average apartment in Sion was 919.42 Swiss francs (CHF) per month (US$740, £410, €590 approx. exchange rate from 2003). The average rate for a one-room apartment was 473.25 CHF (US$380, £210, €300), a two-room apartment was about 679.12 CHF (US$540, £310, €430), a three-room apartment was about 854.95 CHF (US$680, £380, €550) and a six or more room apartment cost an average of 1075.25 CHF (US$860, £480, €690). The average apartment price in Sion was 82.4% of the national average of 1116 CHF. The vacancy rate for the municipality, in 2010, was 0.53%.

== Historic population ==
The historical population is given in the following chart:

Historic Population Data
Year	Total Population	French Speaking	German Speaking	Catholic	Protestant	Other	Jewish	Islamic	No religion given	Swiss	Non-Swiss
1850	3,307			3,213	94					3,073	234
1870	5,456			5,178	296					4,857	618
1888	6,099	3,641	2,273	5,787	310	10				5,476	623
1900	6,751	4,892	1,733	6,417	319	1	9			5,972	779
1910	7,254	5,318	1,695	6,855	381	11	10			6,379	875
1930	8,657	6,726	1,633	8,168	472	11	3			7,931	726
1950	11,770	9,604	1,797	10,967	767	16	5			11,065	705
1970	21,925	16,478	2,646	20,458	1,333	755	12	33	51	18,411	3,514
1990	25,336	19,430	1,735	22,263	1,400	3,028	12	430	707	19,524	5,812
2000	27,171	22,338	1,523	21,220	1,419	2,455	15	1,360	1,371	20,360	6,811

== Politics ==
The municipal council is the executive power in the commune. Its 15 members, non-permanent except the president, are elected every 4 years by the people.

The commune of Sion comprises also of a counsel of public rights of the medieval commune, the Bourgeoisie, who protect the rights of the original inhabitants against new inhabitants. The counsel is made up of 7 people : a president, a vice-president and five counsellors.

=== Elections ===
In the 2015 federal election the most popular party was the CVP with 31.3% of the vote. The next three most popular parties were the FDP (19.9%), the SVP (18.7%) and the SP (17.9%). In the federal election, a total of 11,541 votes were cast, and the voter turnout was 57.7%.

In the 2011 federal election the most popular party was the CVP with 29.8% of the vote. The next three most popular parties were the FDP (22.2%), the SP (20.0%) and the SVP (16.9%). In the federal election, a total of 10,750 votes were cast, and the voter turnout was 58.3%.

In the 2009 Conseil d'État/Staatsrat election a total of 8,663 votes were cast, of which 907 or about 10.5% were invalid. The voter participation was 49.1%, which is much less than the cantonal average of 54.67%. In the 2007 Swiss Council of States election a total of 9,688 votes were cast, of which 835 or about 8.6% were invalid. The voter participation was 55.8%, which is similar to the cantonal average of 59.88%.

In the 2007 federal election the most popular party was the CVP which received 34.5% of the vote. The next three most popular parties were the SP (19.08%), the SVP (15.52%) and the FDP (13.9%). In the federal election, a total of 9,828 votes were cast, and the voter turnout was 55.6%.

== Economy ==
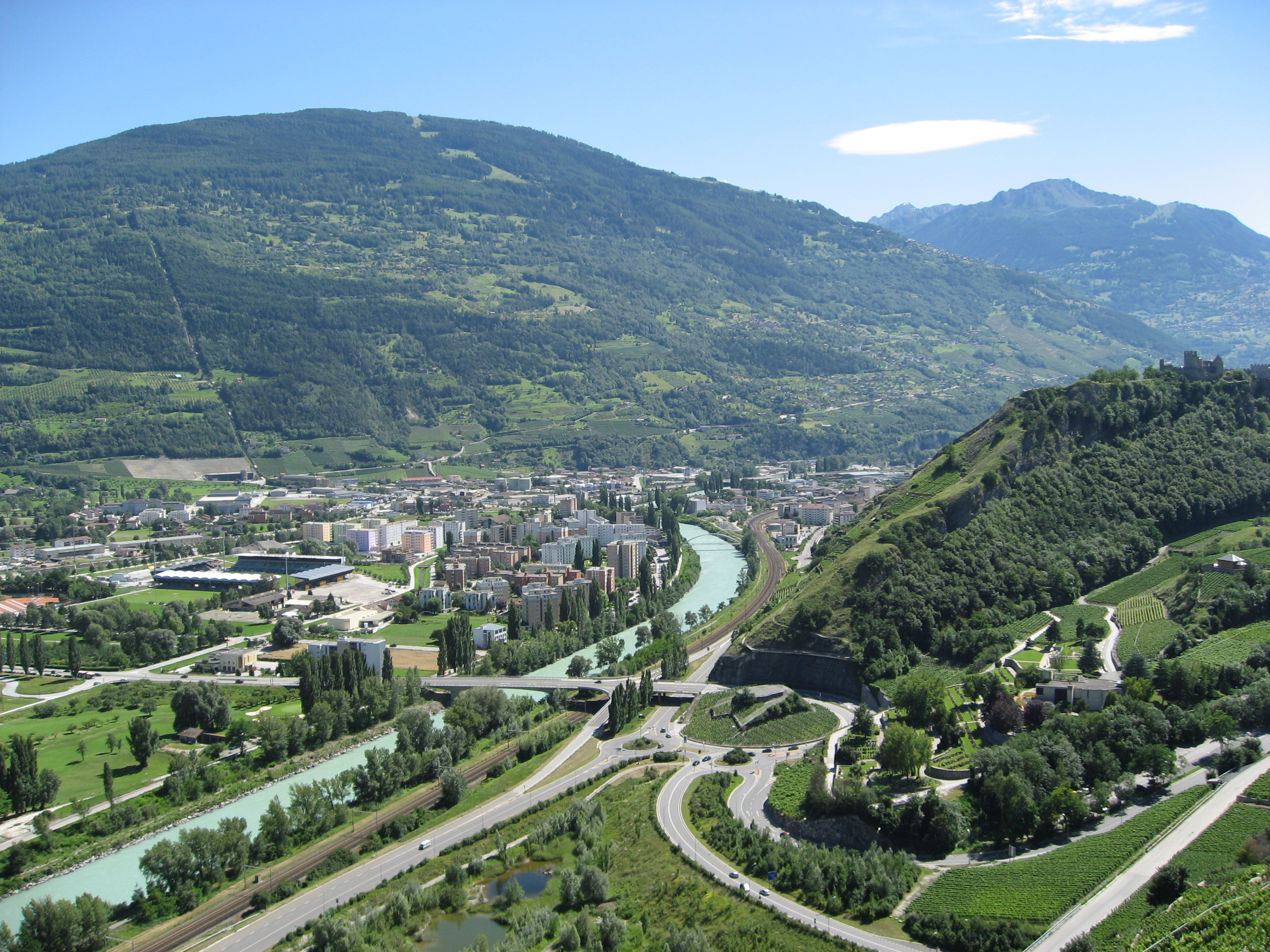
Sion and the Rhône

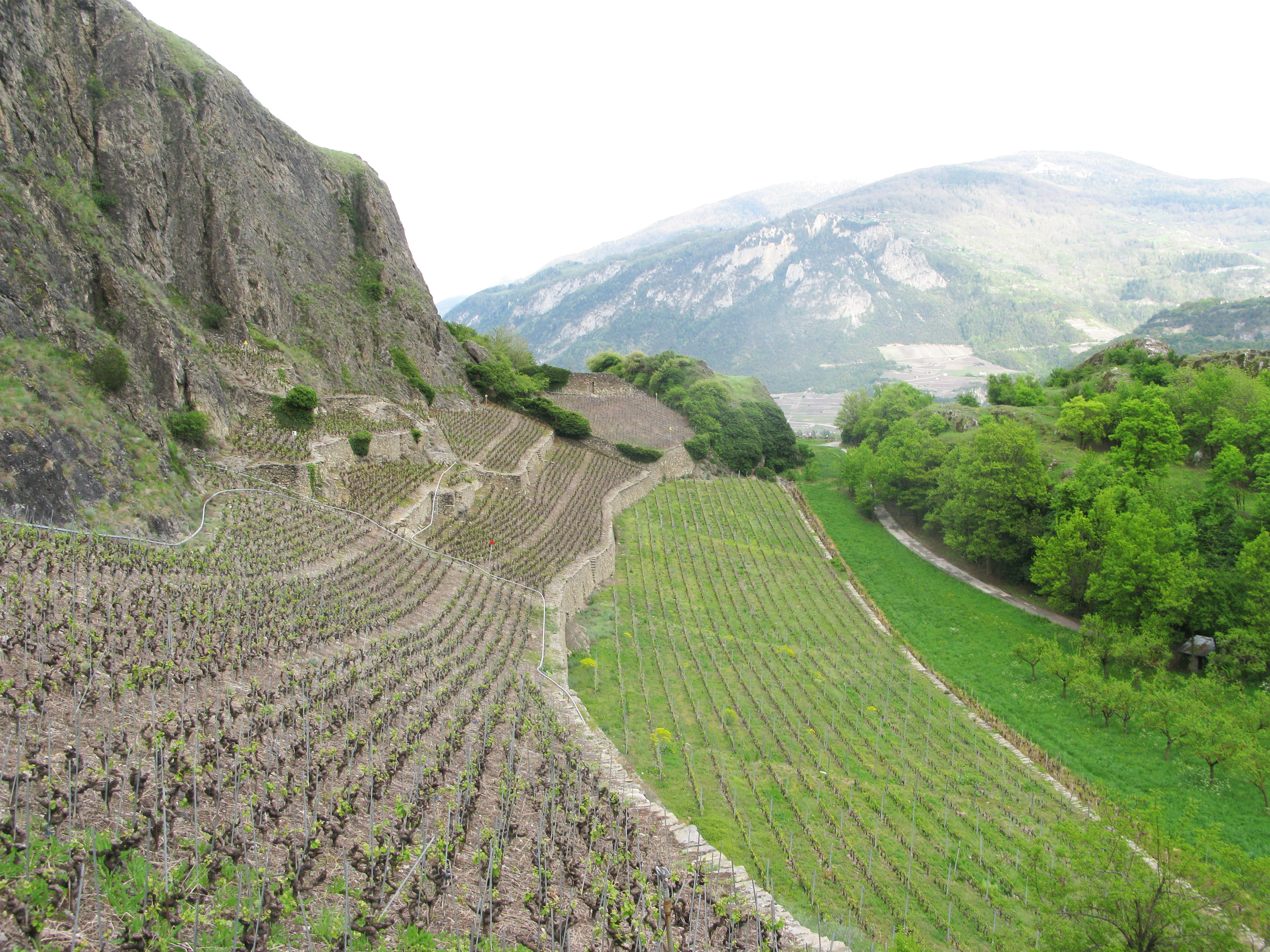
Vineyards near Sion castle

The tertiary sector is the main economic sector in Sion, mainly due to the presence of the canton's administration, the Valaisan parliament and the canton's courthouse. Tourism is also an important sector due to its historic châteaux and museums.

Sion is the third largest wine making region in Switzerland, however, the valuable agricultural land and vineyards are undergoing constant regression due to the process of urbanisation.

Sion has also become an important medical site. The Sion-Region hospital is situated here next to the central institute of Valaisan hospitals and the Suva clinic for physical rehabilitation.

Finally the commune hosts a waste incinerator which disposes of the waste from 44 surrounding communes. This incinerator is equipped with a catalytic converter which lowers the levels of NOx emissions below acceptable levels. In addition, the heat created from the combustion is converted into electrical energy which is then provided to local communes.

Sion is a medium-sized regional center. The municipality is the center of its own agglomeration.

As of 2014, there were a total of 33,228 people employed in the municipality. Of these, a total of 494 people worked in 93 businesses in the primary economic sector. A majority (54.0%) of the primary sector employees worked in very small businesses (less than ten employees). The remainder worked in 7 small businesses with a total of 227 employees. The secondary sector employed 5,638 workers in 466 separate businesses. In 2014 a total of 3,405 employees worked in 447 small companies (less than 50 employees). There were 17 mid sized businesses with 1,614 employees and 2 large businesses which employed a total of 619 people. Finally, the tertiary sector provided 27,096 jobs in 3,134 businesses. In 2014 a total of 16,599 employees worked in 3,068 small companies (less than 50 employees). There were 60 mid sized businesses with 7,289 employees and 6 large businesses which employed 3,208 people.

In 2014 a total of 8.1% of the population received social assistance.

In 2015 local hotels had a total of 61,402 overnight stays, of which 22.6% were international visitors.

In 2008 the total number of full-time equivalent jobs was 21,338. The number of jobs in the primary sector was 245, all of which were in agriculture. The number of jobs in the secondary sector was 4,830 of which 1,976 or (40.9%) were in manufacturing, 51 or (1.1%) were in mining and 2,323 (48.1%) were in construction. The number of jobs in the tertiary sector was 16,263. In the tertiary sector; 3,356 or 20.6% were in wholesale or retail sales or the repair of motor vehicles, 858 or 5.3% were in the movement and storage of goods, 968 or 6.0% were in a hotel or restaurant, 685 or 4.2% were in the information industry, 1,566 or 9.6% were the insurance or financial industry, 1,357 or 8.3% were technical professionals or scientists, 1,249 or 7.7% were in education and 2,989 or 18.4% were in health care.

In 2000, there were 13,194 workers who commuted into the municipality and 2,857 workers who commuted away. The municipality is a net importer of workers, with about 4.6 workers entering the municipality for every one leaving. Of the working population, 10.4% used public transportation to get to work, and 57.1% used a private car.

== Heritage sites of national significance ==
There are 14 buildings or sites in Sion that are listed as Swiss heritage site of national significance. The secular buildings include the Archives de l’État du Valais, the Archives and Museum of the Bishop of Sion and the cathedral, the town hall (with its astronomical clock), Majorie Castle, La Majorie on Rue des Châteaux 19, Le Vidomnat on Place de la Majorie 15, the Maison Supersaxo, the Médiathèque Valais Sion, the Cantonal Fine Arts and History Museums and the ruins of Tourbillon Castle. The religious buildings on the list are the Cathédrale Notre-Dame, the Capuchin monastery and library, the church of the Notre-Dame de Valère and the church of St-Théodule. The remains of a Neolithic settlement and the modern city of Sion are also on the list. The entire town of Sion and the village of Bramois are both part of the Inventory of Swiss Heritage Sites.

A characteristic of Sion is its medieval townscape, dominated by the hills Valère (610 m (2,000 ft)) with the Basilique de Valère (12th–13th century), and Tourbillon (658 m (2,159 ft)) with the ruins of the Tourbillon Castle. The Valère Basilica is the church on top of the southern of the two mottes, at the east end of the old town. It houses the oldest playable organ in the world, which was built in the 1430s.

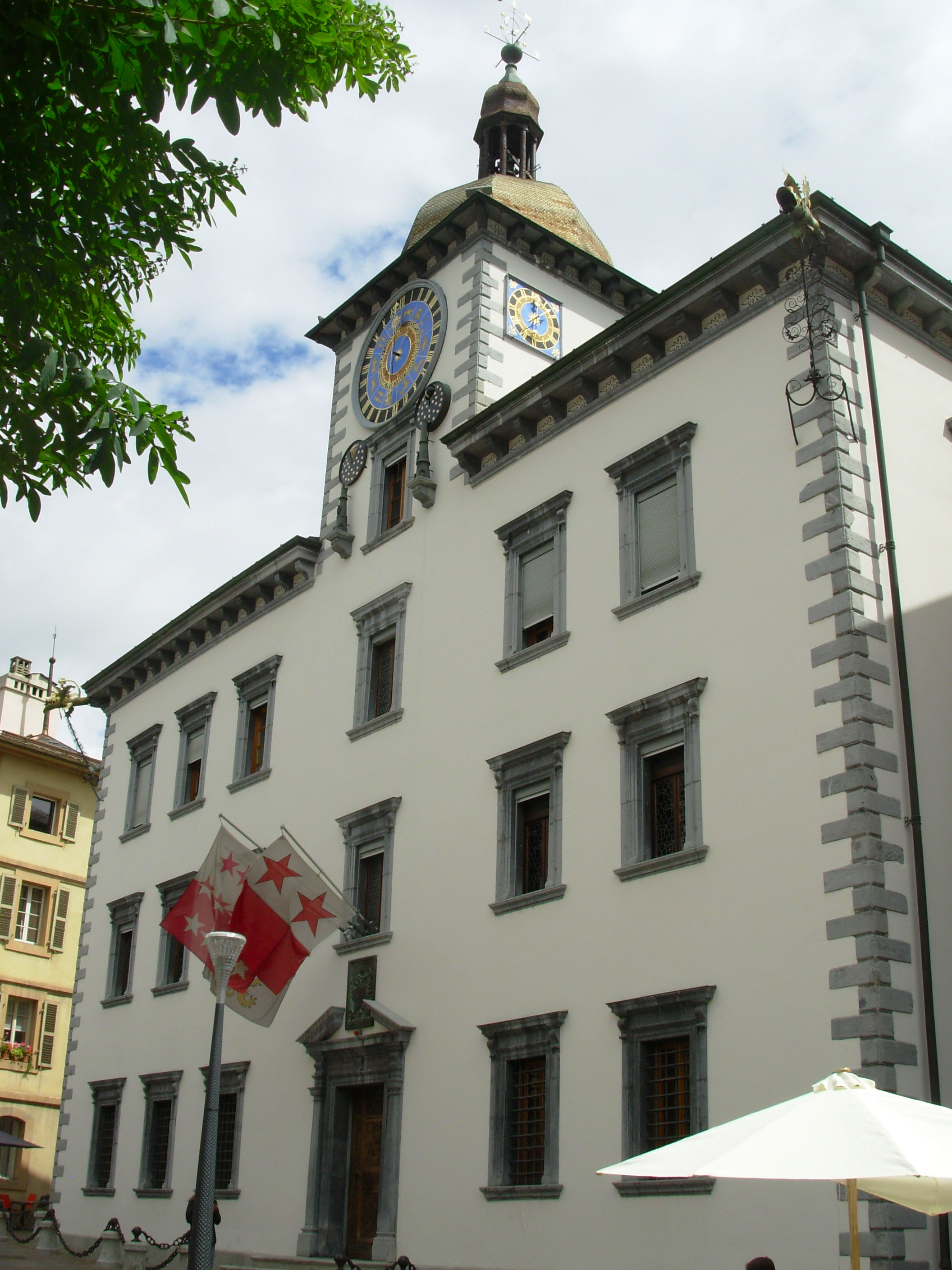
Hôtel de Ville

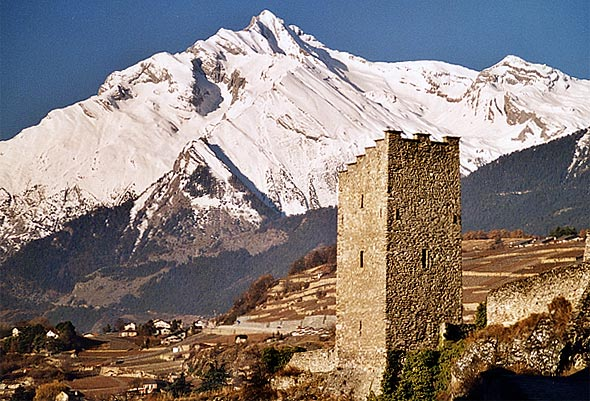
La Majorie

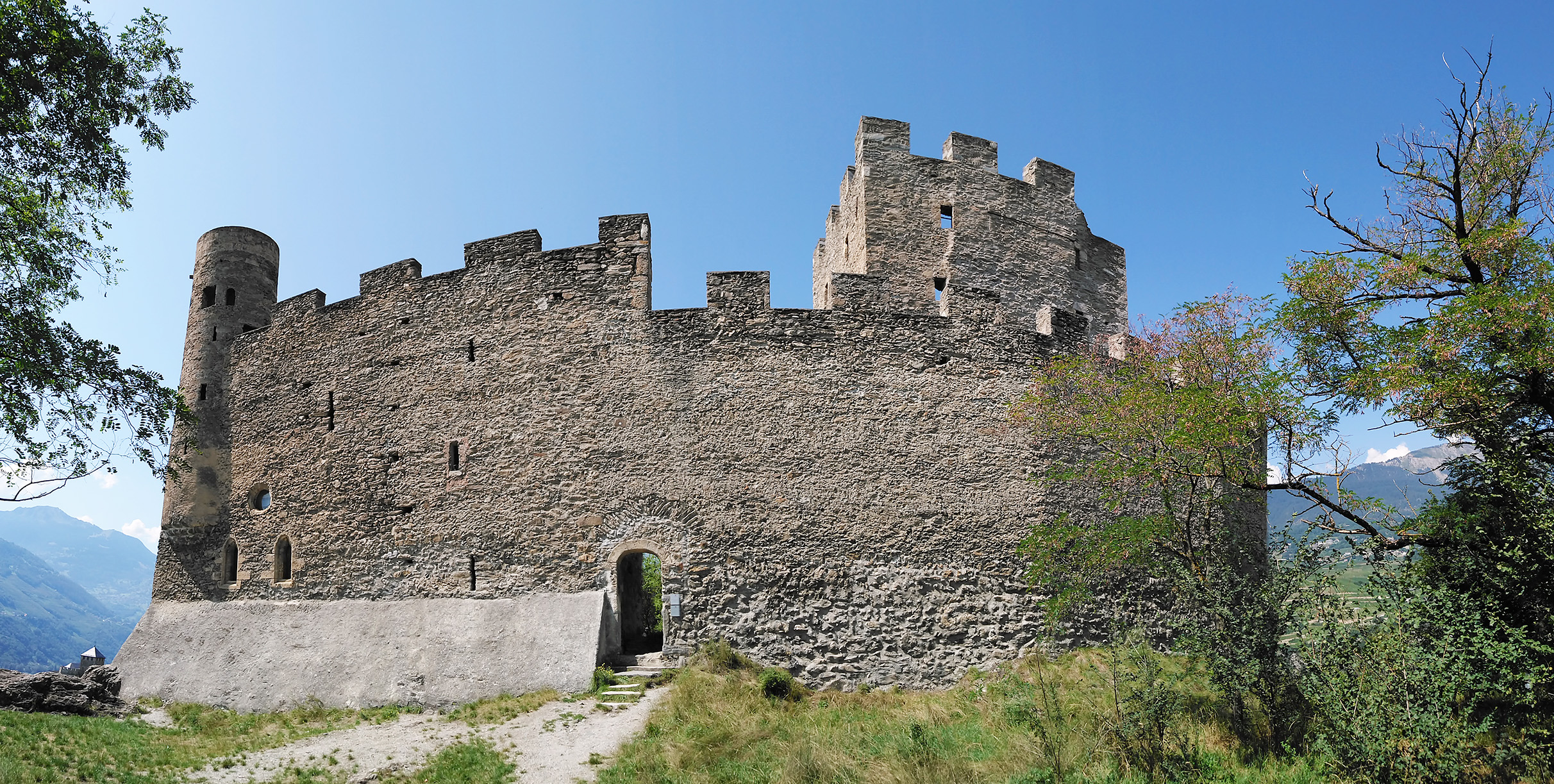
Tourbillon Castle

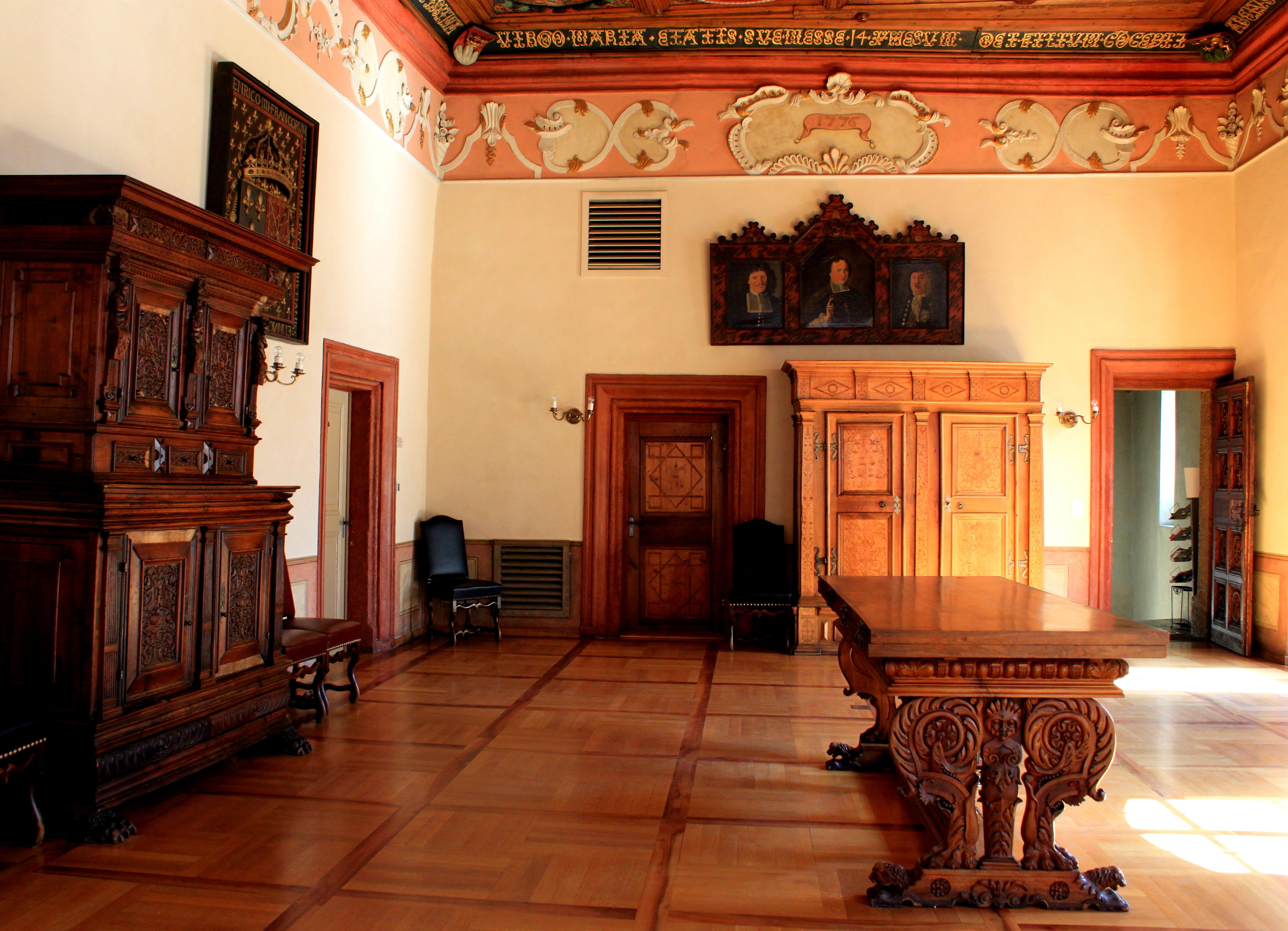
Maison Supersaxo

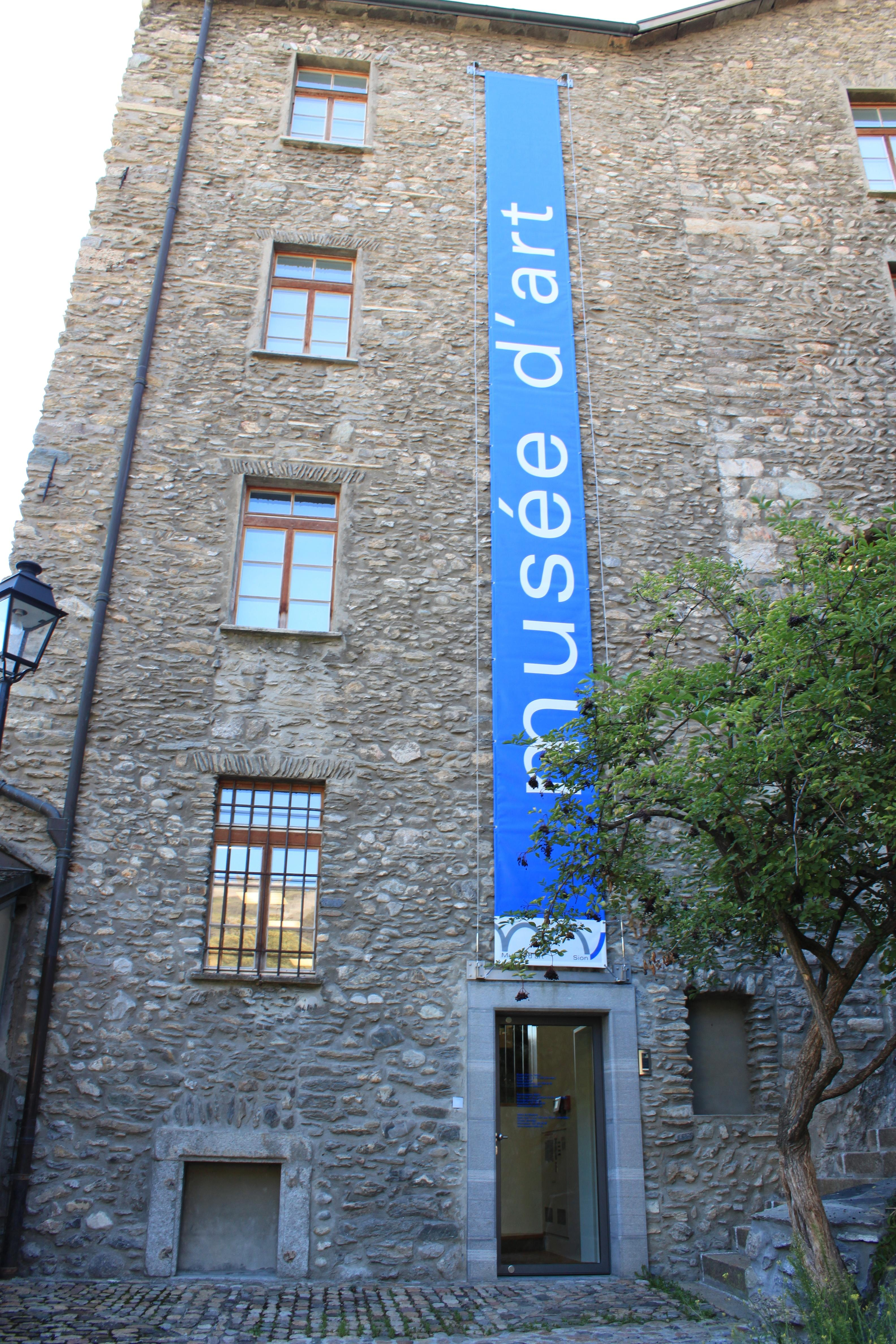
Fine Arts Museum

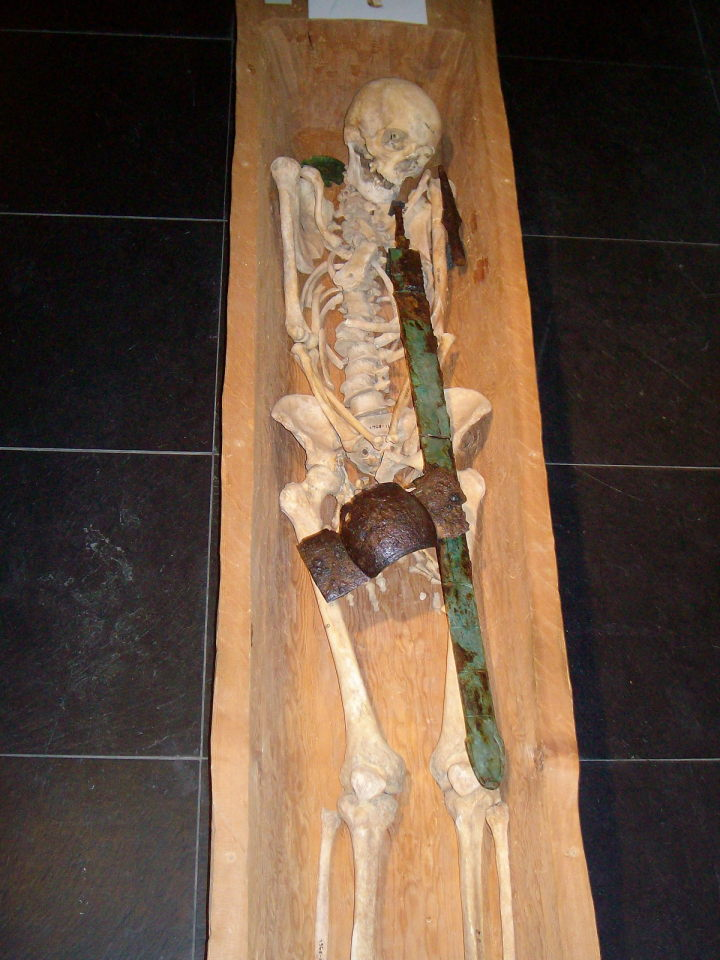
Skeleton from the History Museum

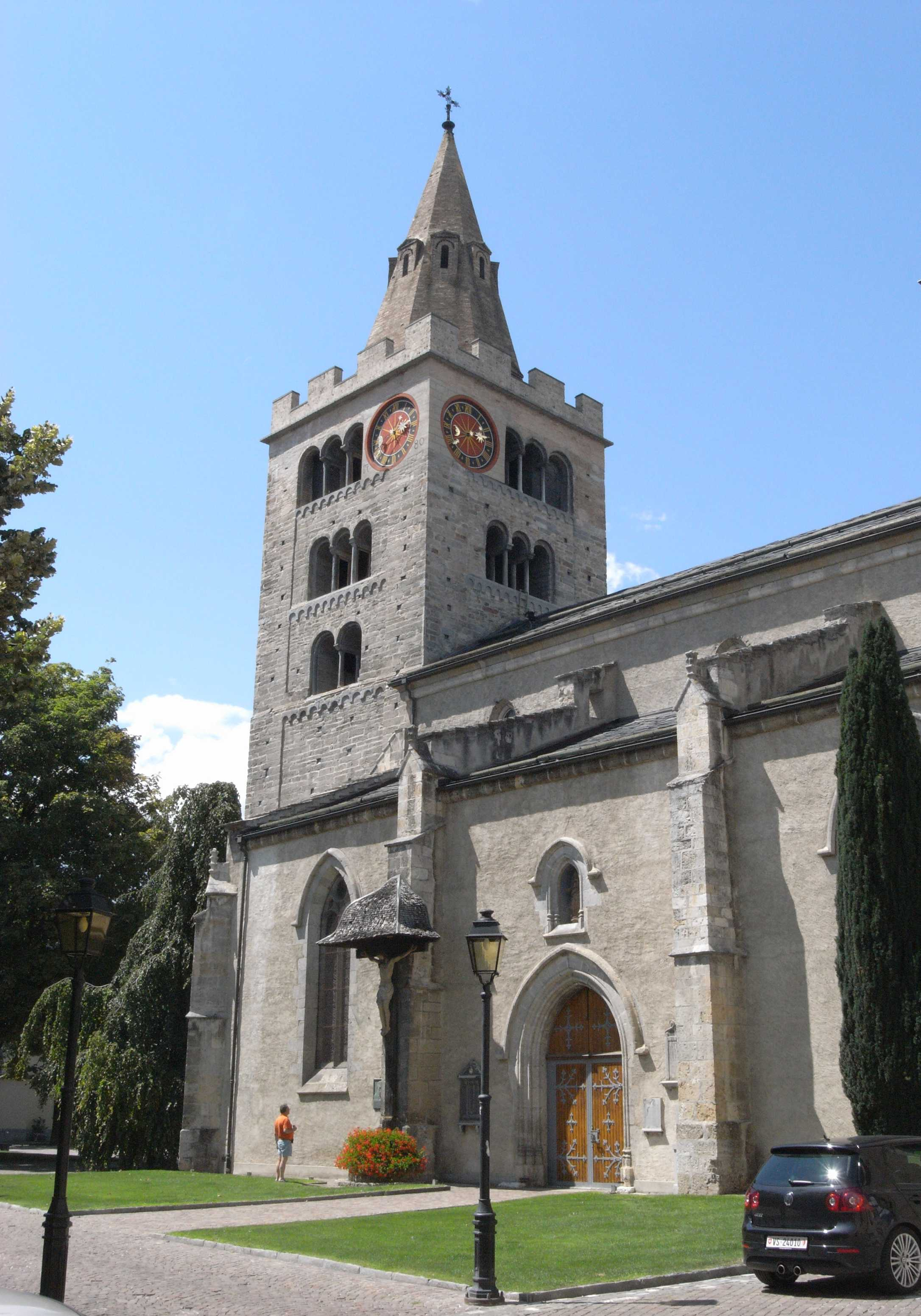
Notre-Dame Cathedral

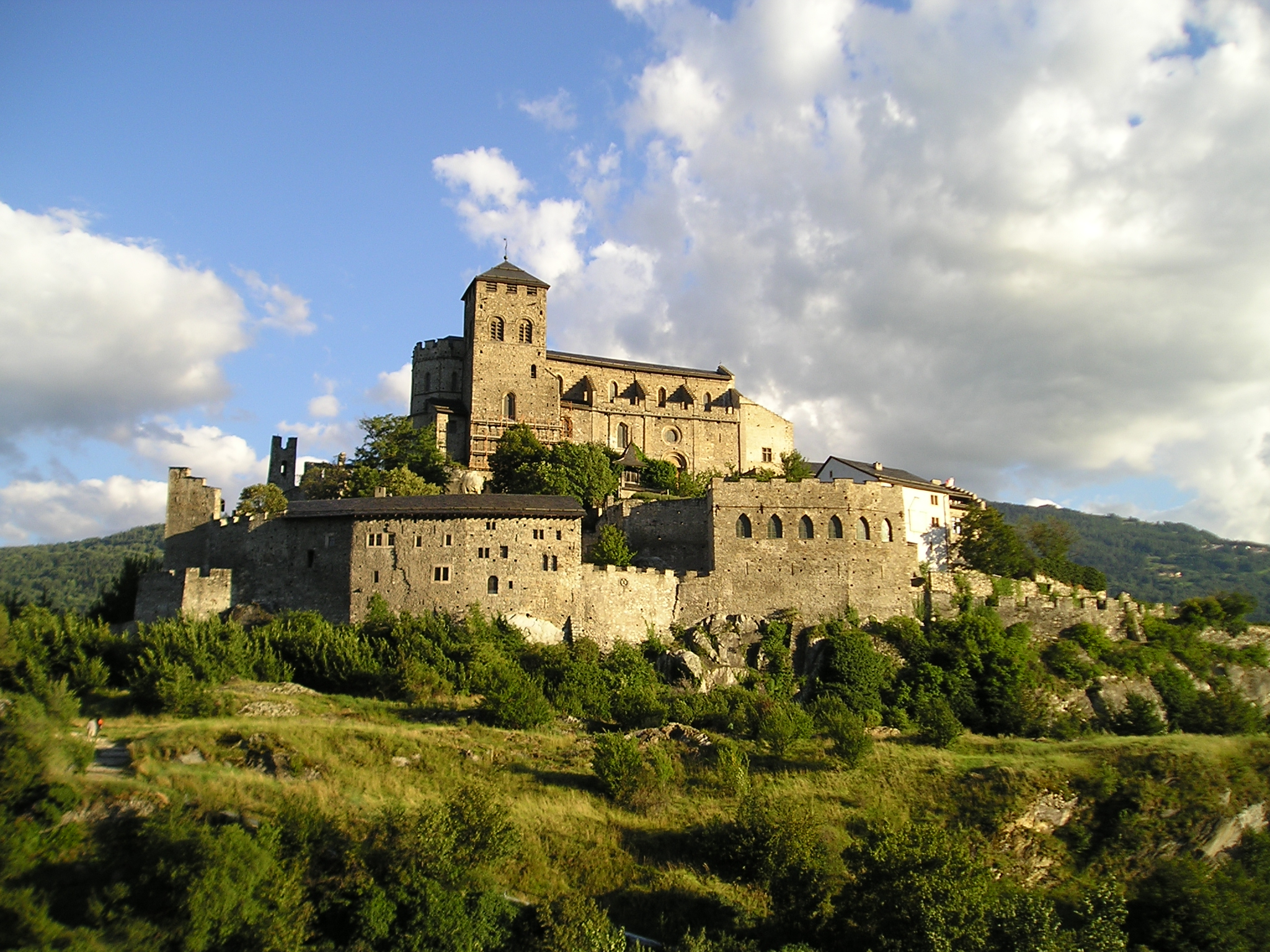
Valère Basilica

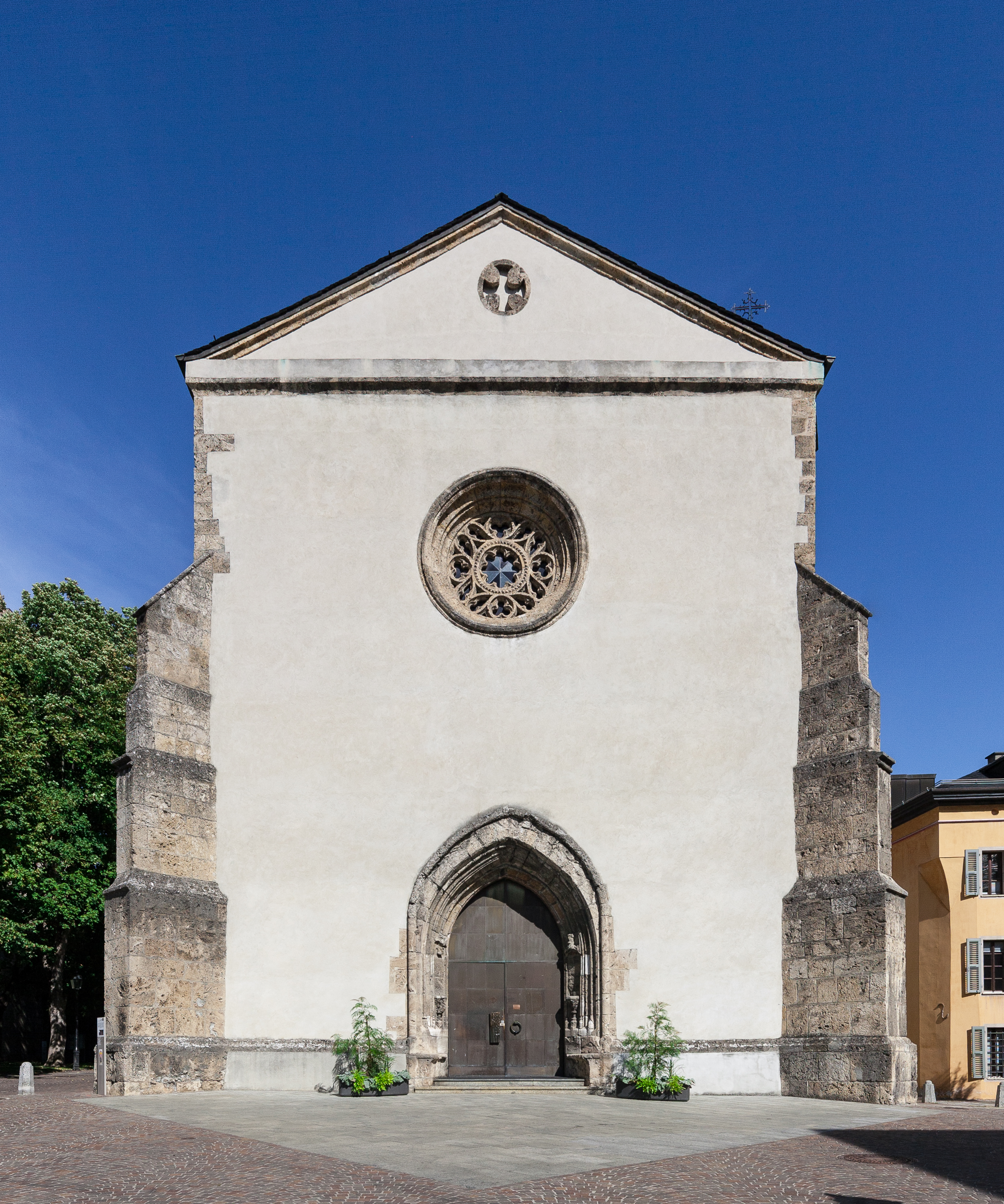
St. Théodule

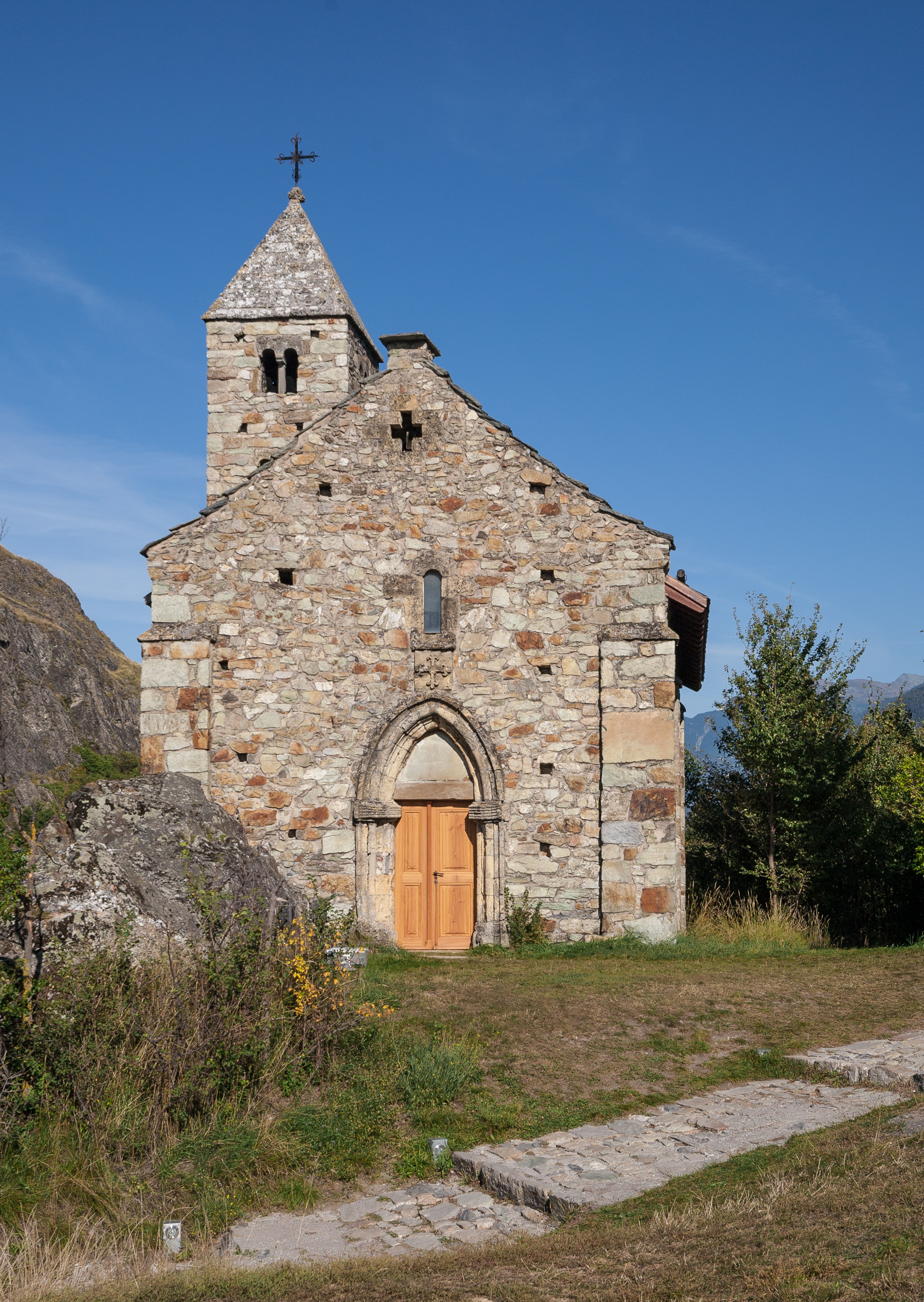
Chapelle de Tous les Saints Sion

== Airshows ==
Public Airshows have been held at the airfield of Sion. Aerobatic teams such as the Frecce Tricolori from Italy and the Patrouille de France have performed there.

== Sport ==
The football club FC Sion plays in the Swiss Super League. Their stadium is the Stade Tourbillon.

HCV Sion is the city's main Ice hockey team. They play in the Swiss Premiere League, the third tier of Swiss hockey. Their arena is the Ancien Stand which has a seating capacity of 1,200.

On 1 May 2021, the Alaia Bay surfing wave pool made by Wavegarden opened in Sion. It is the first surf pool open to the public in mainland Europe.

Sion has never previously hosted the Olympics but bid for the Olympics in 1976, 2002, 2006 and 2026.

== Media ==
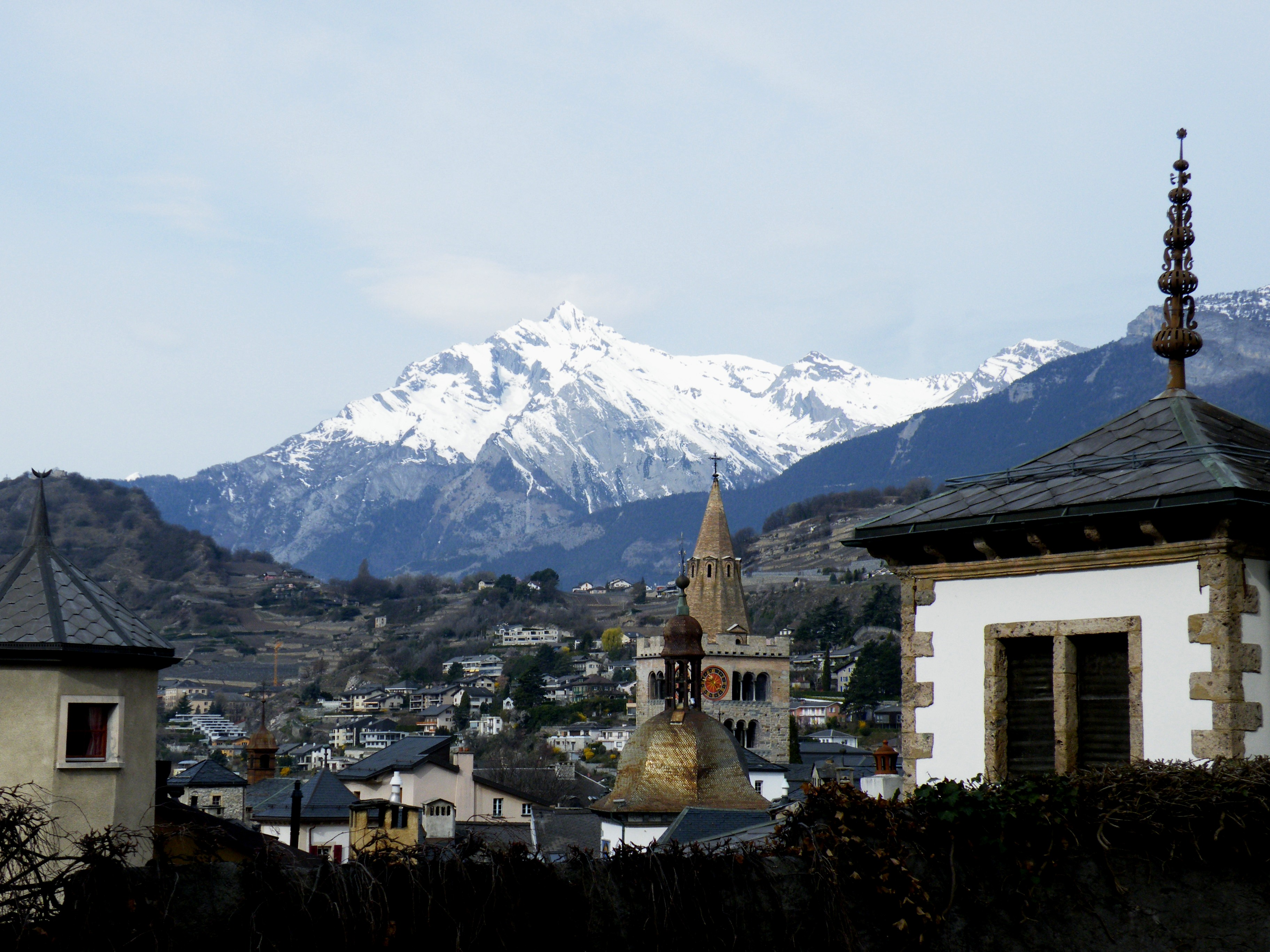
Haut de Cry mountain at the west side of Sion

Sion is host to a number of newspapers, television and radio stations:

- Le Nouvelliste, a daily Valais paper printed in Sion;
- Canal 9, regional Valais television;
- Rhône FM, private Valaisan radio;
- TSR, retransmission of public Swiss television.

== Education ==
In Sion about 8,560 or (31.5%) of the population have completed non-mandatory upper secondary education, and 3,670 or (13.5%) have completed additional higher education (either university or a Fachhochschule). Of the 3,670 who completed tertiary schooling, 54.9% were Swiss men, 32.0% were Swiss women, 7.5% were non-Swiss men and 5.6% were non-Swiss women.

As of 2000, there were 3,122 students in Sion who came from another municipality, while 261 residents attended schools outside the municipality.

Sion is home to 4 libraries. These libraries include; the Médiathèque Valais Sion, the Bibliothèque municipale de Sion, the HES-SO Valais Médiathèque santé-social and the HES-SO Valais, Domaine Sciences de l'ingénieur. There was a combined total (as of 2008) of 690,513 books or other media in the libraries, and in the same year a total of 294,320 items were loaned out.

=== Schools ===
Sion has two high schools (colleges)

- the Lycée-Collège des Creusets (LCC);
- the Lycée-Collège de la Planta (LCP).

Sion is also host to the :

- Ecole d’agriculture du Valais, situated in Châteauneuf, Sion;
- A circus school;
- A jazz school;
- HES-SO Valais, a technical university;
- HEM Valais (Conservatoire Supérieur et Académie de Musique Tibor Varga).

The HES-SO Valais offers education in Sciences, Engineering, Economics, Information Technology and Health Sciences.

- There is a Business and Tourism university situated near Sion Institut Universitaire Kurt Bösch.

== Transport ==
Sion has a railway station that provide trainlinks to Geneva, Milan, Venice and other parts of Switzerland. The city is also along the E62 motorway. Sion Airport only provides routes to limited destinations, the nearest larger domestic and international airport is Geneva Airport, located 160 km (99 mi) west of the city centre.

== Religion ==
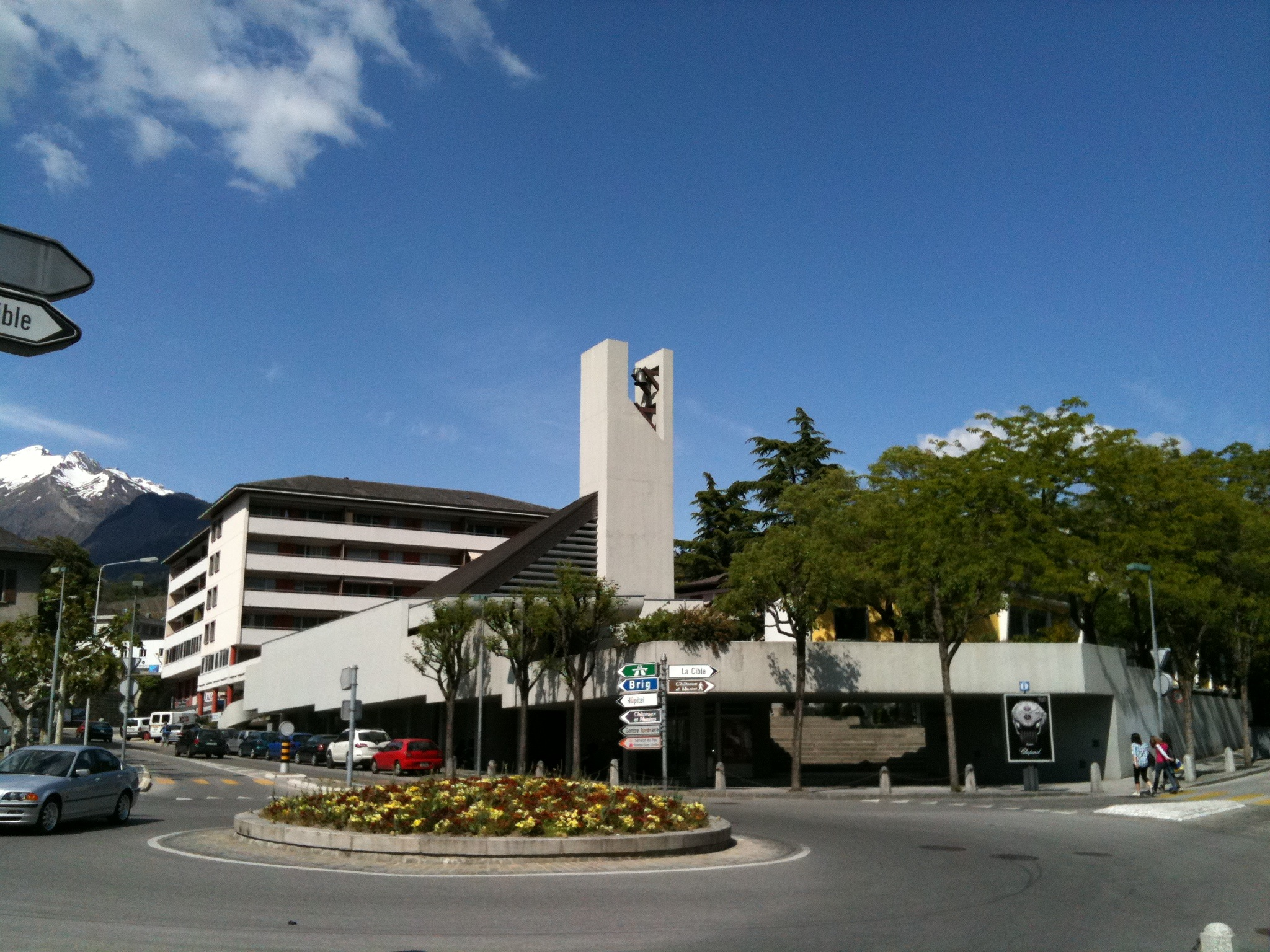
Reformed church in Sion

From the 2000 census, 21,220 or 78.1% were Roman Catholic, while 1,198 or 4.4% belonged to the Swiss Reformed Church. Of the rest of the population, there were 212 members of an Orthodox church (or about 0.78% of the population), there were 18 individuals (or about 0.07% of the population) who belonged to the Christian Catholic Church, and there were 453 individuals (or about 1.67% of the population) who belonged to another Christian church. There were 16 individuals (or about 0.06% of the population) who were Jewish, and 1,360 (or about 5.01% of the population) who were Islamic. There were 86 individuals who were Buddhist, 52 individuals who were Hindu and 22 individuals who belonged to another church. 1,371 (or about 5.05% of the population) belonged to no church, are agnostic or atheist, and 1,385 individuals (or about 5.10% of the population) did not answer the question.

== Crime ==
In 2014 the crime rate, of the over 200 crimes listed in the Swiss Criminal Code (running from murder, robbery and assault to accepting bribes and election fraud), in Sion was 72.2 per thousand residents, which is slightly higher than the national average. During the same period, the rate of drug crimes was 20.6 per thousand residents, over twice the national rate. In contrast, the rate of violations of immigration, visa and work permit laws was 0.9 per thousand residents, which is only 18.4% of the rate for the entire country.

== Notable people ==
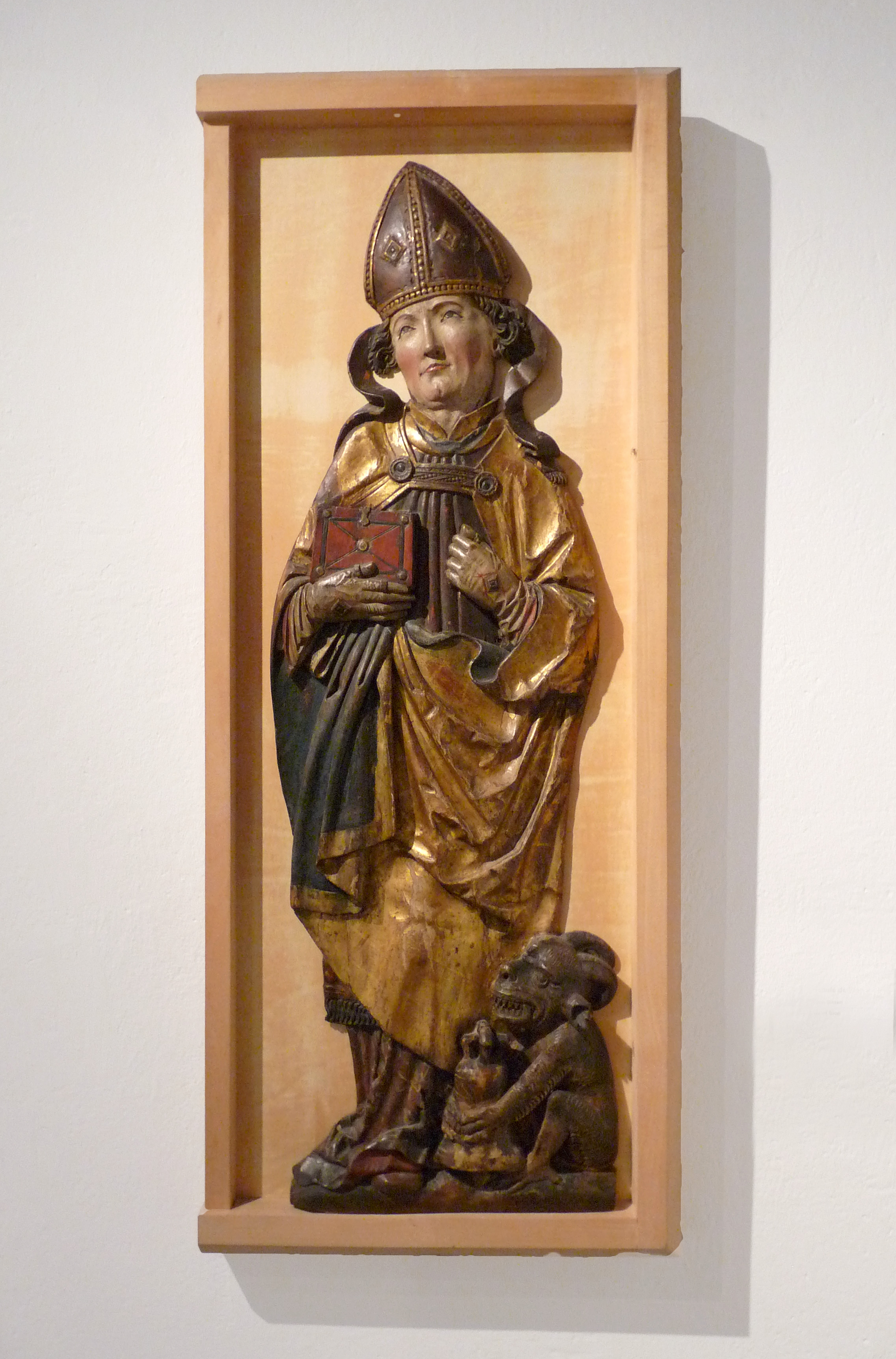
Saint Théodule de Sion

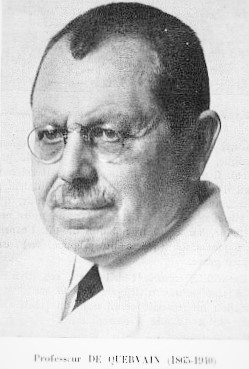
Fritz de Quervain

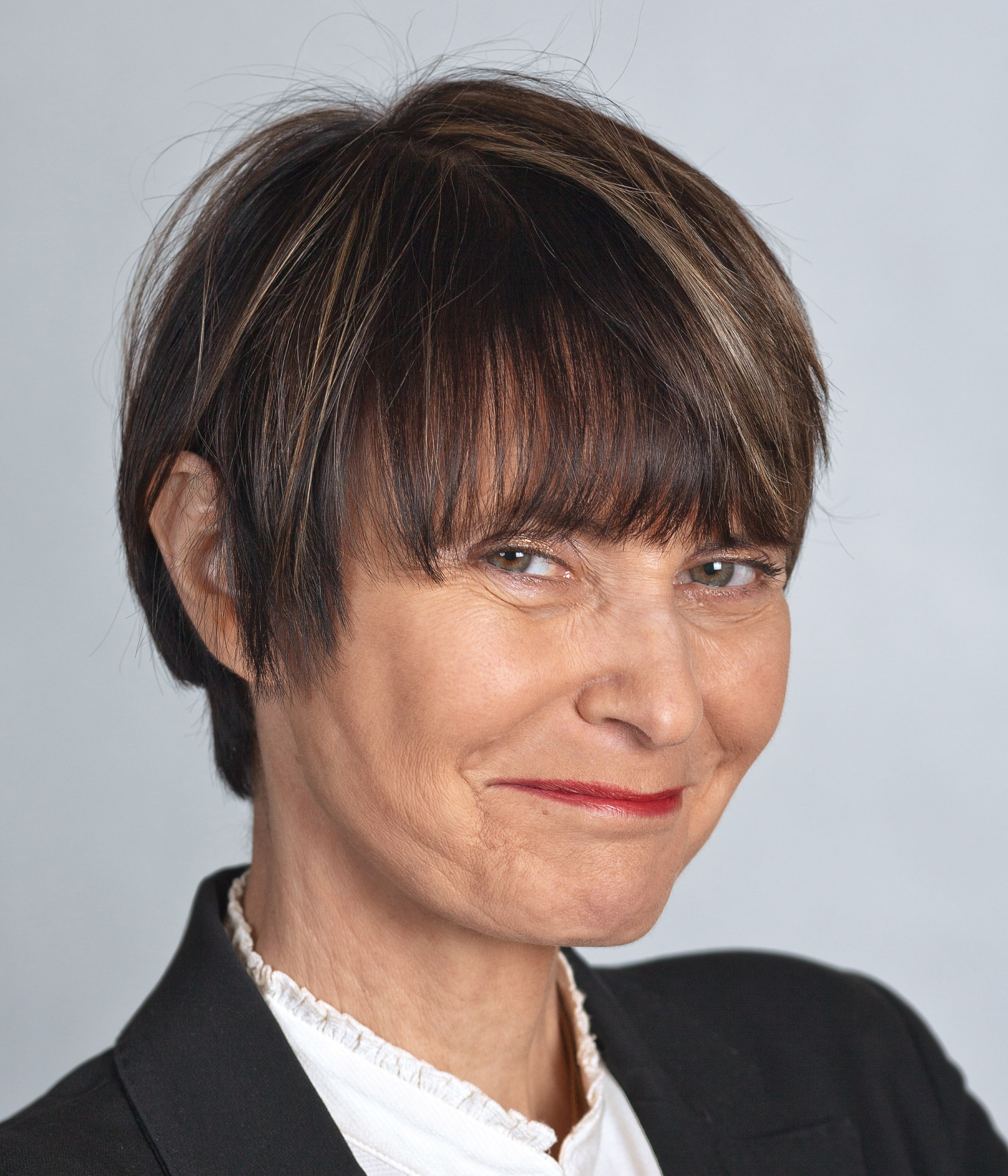
Micheline Calmy-Rey, 2011

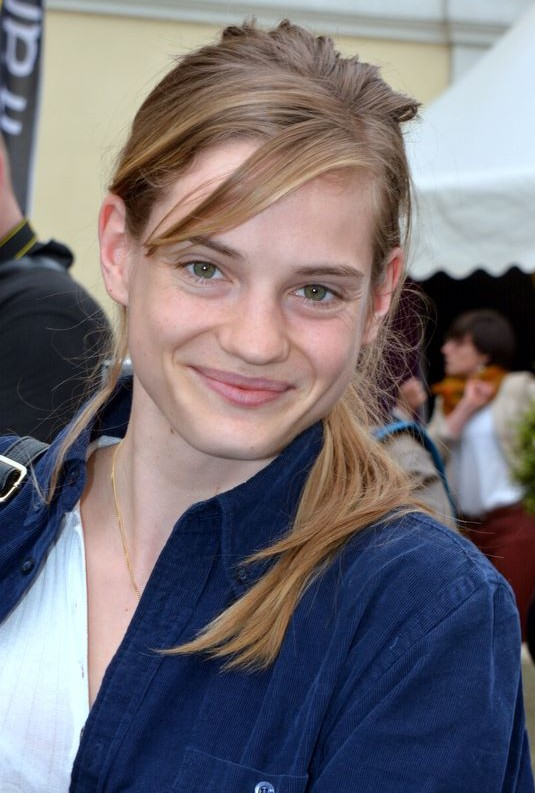
Noémie Schmidt, 2016

People associated with Sion include:

- Saint Theodore of Octodurum (Ger: Theodor von Sitten), 4th century Patron Saint of Valais and the Walser
- Saint Guarinus of Sitten (1065–1150), Bishop of Sion
- Hildebrand of Riedmatten, Bishop of Sion in 1594, whencefrom comes the coat of arms of Sitten/Sion
- Ignaz Venetz (1788–1859), Swiss civil engineer, botanist and glaciologist
- Anton von Riedmatten (1811–1897), Swiss politician
- Leo Luzian von Roten (1824–1898), Swiss politician, poet and editor of the Walliser Wochenblatt
- Ernest von Stockalper (1838–1919) was a Swiss civil engineer, foreman for the Gotthard tunnel
- Fritz de Quervain (1868–1940), a Swiss surgeon, authority on thyroid disease.
- Walther Ritz (1878–1909), theoretical physicist
- Charles Oser (1902–1994), a Swiss politician
- Maurice Zermatten (1910–2001), a French-speaking Swiss writer
- Hermann Geiger (1914–1966), a Swiss aviator and search and rescue pilot
- Dr Hywel Davies (1924–2016), a cardiologist and writer, lived in Sion
- Micheline Calmy-Rey (born 1945), politician, president of the Confederation in 2007 and 2011
- Carole de Kalbermatten (1945–2009), Swiss film director and feminist who grew up in Sion
- Jean Zermatten (born 1948), lawyer, chairman of the UN Committee on the Rights of the Child
- Madeleine Carruzzo (born 1956), a Swiss violinist, plays for the Berlin Philharmonic
- Oskar Freysinger (born 1960), Swiss politician, studied at a German-speaking school in Sion
- Brigitte Fournier (born 1961), Swiss operatic soprano
- Stéphane Udry (born 1961), an astronomer at the Geneva Observatory, searches for extra-solar planets
- Jean-Pierre Siggen (born 1962), a Swiss politician
- Christelle Luisier (born 1974), politician
- Nicolas Steiner (born in 1984), Swiss film director, screenwriter and film producer
- Samael, extreme metal band, formed in 1987 in Sion
- Noémie Schmidt (born 1990), a Swiss actress on TV and film
- Pierre Ducrey (born 1938), archaeologist specialising in Greek epigraphy
- Georges Dumitresco (1922–2008), Romanian-Swiss physician, painter, illustrator and poet

Sport

- Toni Branca (1916–1985), a Swiss racing driver
- Jean-Claude Rudaz (born 1942), a Swiss racing driver
- Umberto Barberis (born 1952), a former Swiss-Italian footballer, over 400 club games and 54 for national team
- Marco Pascolo (born 1966), a retired Swiss international football goalkeeper, 406 club games and 55 for national team
- Björn Bregy (born 1974), a Swiss super heavyweight kickboxer
- Johnny Leoni (born 1984), a football goalkeeper over 250 club games and 54 for the national team
- Sophie Lamon (born 1985), a Swiss fencer, silver medallist in the women's team épée event at the 2000 Summer Olympics
- Gelson Fernandes (born 1986), footballer, over 350 club games and 57 for the national side
- Tiffany Géroudet (born 1986), a Swiss épée fencer, competed at the 2012 Summer Olympics
- Estelle Balet (1994–2016), a Swiss freeride snowboarder and two-time world champion
- Edimilson Fernandes (born 1996), footballer, on loan to West Ham United F.C.

== Twin towns ==
Sion is twinned with:

Colón, Argentina	Philippi, West Virginia, United States
