= Pierre Ducrey =

Swiss archaeologist and academic

- Born: November 14, 1938 (age 87); Sion, Switzerland
- Known for: Excavation of Philippi and Eretria
- Scientific career
- Fields: Archaeology

Pierre Ducrey ⟨Greek: Πιέρ Ντικρέ; born 14 November 1938 in Sion, Switzerland⟩ is an archaeologist, professor and former rector of the University of Lausanne who specializes in Greek epigraphy.

== Career ==
Ducrey obtained a degree in literature from the University of Lausanne (Faculté des lettres) in 1961 and in 1964 a doctorate from the Paris-Sorbonne University. From 1967 to 1970 he was a foreign member of the French School at Athens. Latter, he served as the director of the Swiss School of Archaeology in Greece from 1982 to 2006 and since 2010 is the director of the Hardt Foundation for the Study of Classical Antiquity.

Ducrey is the author of various books and articles, mainly in the fields of archaeology, Greek epigraphy and the ancient Greek cities of Philippi and Eretria.

== Honors and awards ==
- Commander of the Order of the Phoenix of the Hellenic Republic, 1991.
- Honorary doctorate from the University of Athens, 2000.
- Foreign correspondent of the Academy of Inscriptions and Belles-Lettres of the Institut de France since 2001.
- Foreign associate member of the Academy of Inscriptions and Belles-Lettres of the Institut de France since 2008.
- Honorary Professor at the University of Lausanne since 2004.
- Officer of the National Order of the Legion of Honor, 2018.
