= Bramois =

Coordinates: 46.232°N 7.402°E

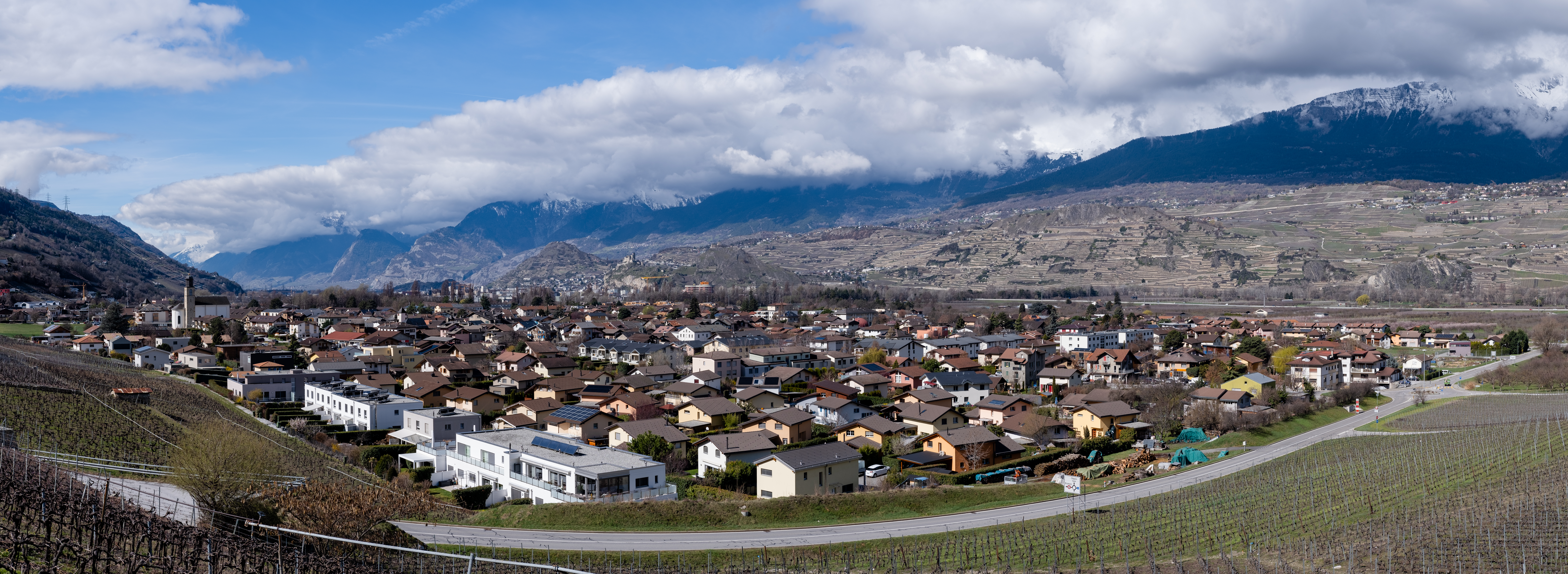
View of Bramois

Bramois is a village located in Switzerland, in the canton of Valais, approximately 4 km southeast of the center of Sion. The commune of Bramois was merged with the commune of Sion in 1968.
