= Sion astronomical clock =

Astronomical clock at the town hall of Sion in the canton of Valais, Switzerland

Coordinates: 46°14′02″N 7°21′38″E

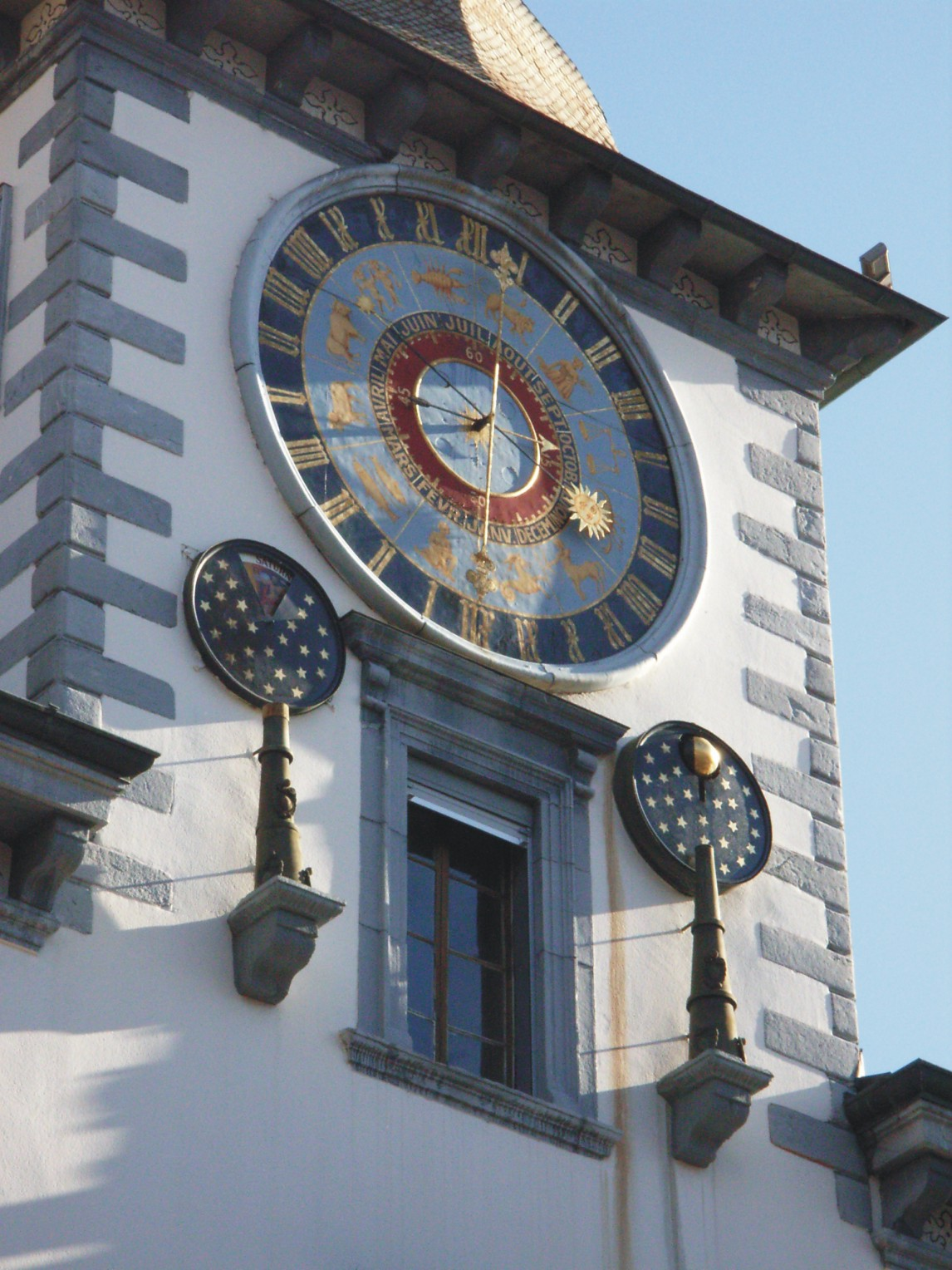
The astronomical clock of Sion town hall

The Sion astronomical clock is an astronomical clock at the town hall of Sion in the canton of Valais, Switzerland. The clock was first installed in 1667–68; the present mechanism dates from 1902.

The clock has five dials: on the two lateral sides of the clock tower, there are 12-hour dials. The principal dial on the front of the tower indicates, from the outer to the inner ring:

- the hours, on a chapter ring numbered I to XII twice, indicated by a double-ended fleur-de-lys hand;
- the signs of the zodiac;
- the months;
- the minutes, indicated by an arrow hand.

The position of the Sun in the zodiac and the month are both indicated by a hand with a golden sun. The other end of this hand, with a star, indicates the constellation which passes through the meridian at Sion in the middle of the night.

The two smaller dials underneath the principal dial indicate the day of the week, represented by an illustration of its classical deity, and the lunar phase by means of a rotating moon ball.
