= Wildhornhütte =

Swiss mountain hut

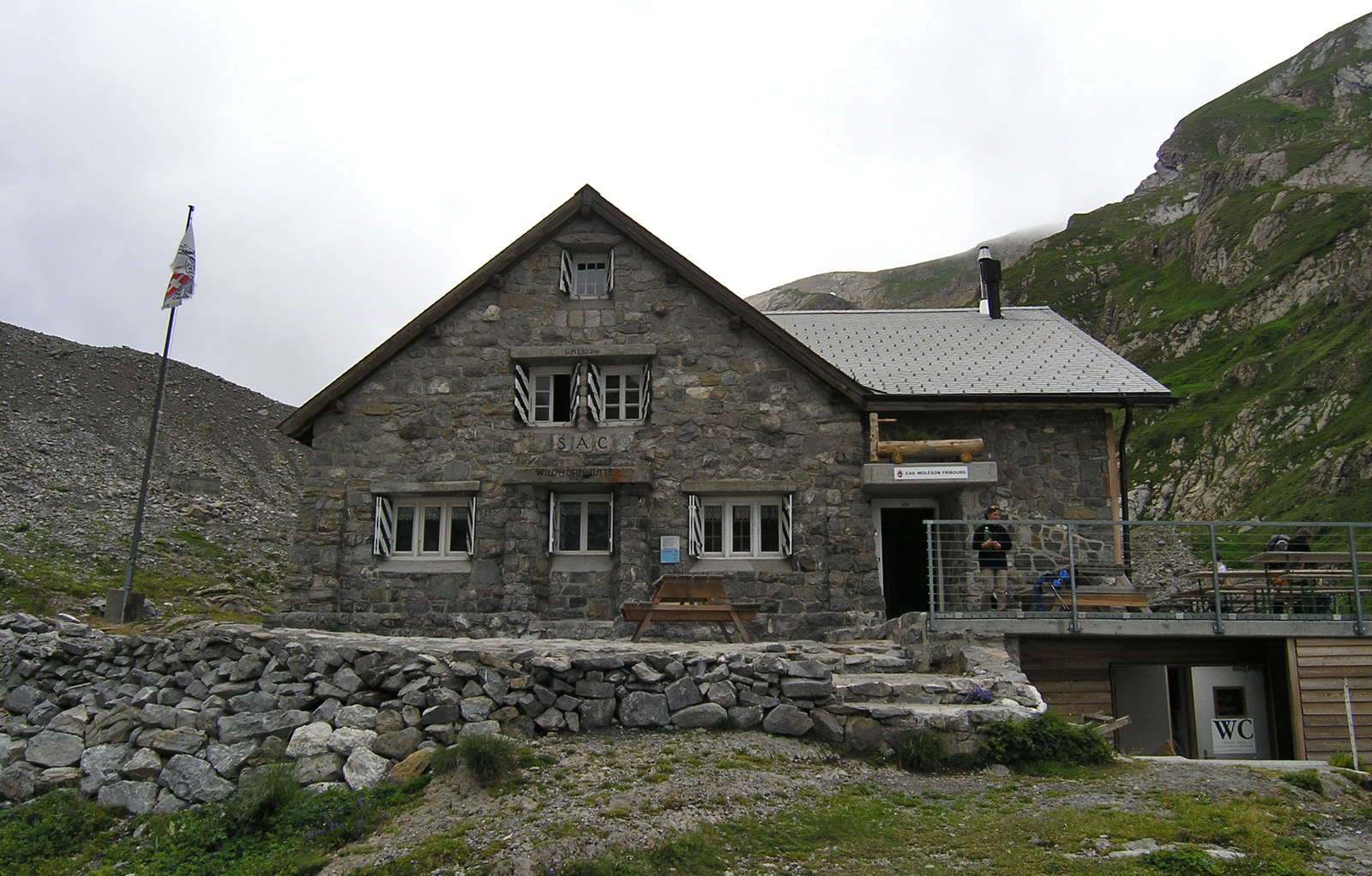
- Wildhornhütte in summer

- Location within Canton of Bern

General information
- Location: Wildhorn, Northeast face
- Coordinates: 46°22′45″N 7°23′17″E
- Elevation: 2,303 m (7,556 ft)
- Year built: 1878,1929

Website
- [ www.wildhornhuette.ch]]

The Wildhornhütte is a refuge of the Swiss Alpine Club (SAC) and is located on the Wildhorn massif in the western Bernese Alps. The hut is managed by the SAC Moléson section.

== Location ==
The hut is located at 2,303 m above sea level, at the north foot of the Wildhorn near the Iffigsee. The Wildhornhütte is intended as accommodation before the last stage of the Wildhorn ascent.

Since 1878 there has been a modest refuge under overhanging rocks "by the Crooked Waters" that stuck to the rock like a swallow's nest. In 1899, the Moléson Section of the SAC built a detached wooden hut opposite the old club hut. The site was assigned free of charge by the landowner Wilhelm Hildebrand as an independent permanent building.

After a fire, a new stone building was built in 1929, with 60–70 beds at the time. The hut was expanded in 1999, minorly renovated in 2014 and now has 96 beds, divided into 9 rooms.

== Access ==
The Wildhornhütte can be reached in around 2.5 hours from Lenk via Iffigenalp or from Lauenen via Lauenensee in around 4.5 hours. Another approach from Lenk begins with the Leiterli lift, via the Tungelpass. It can be reached from Sion via the Rawilpass. The hut is open from June to the end of October.

== Ascent opportunities ==
- Wildhorn 3'248 m
- Niesehorn 2'776 m
- Iffighore 2'378 m
- Schnidehorn 2'937 m
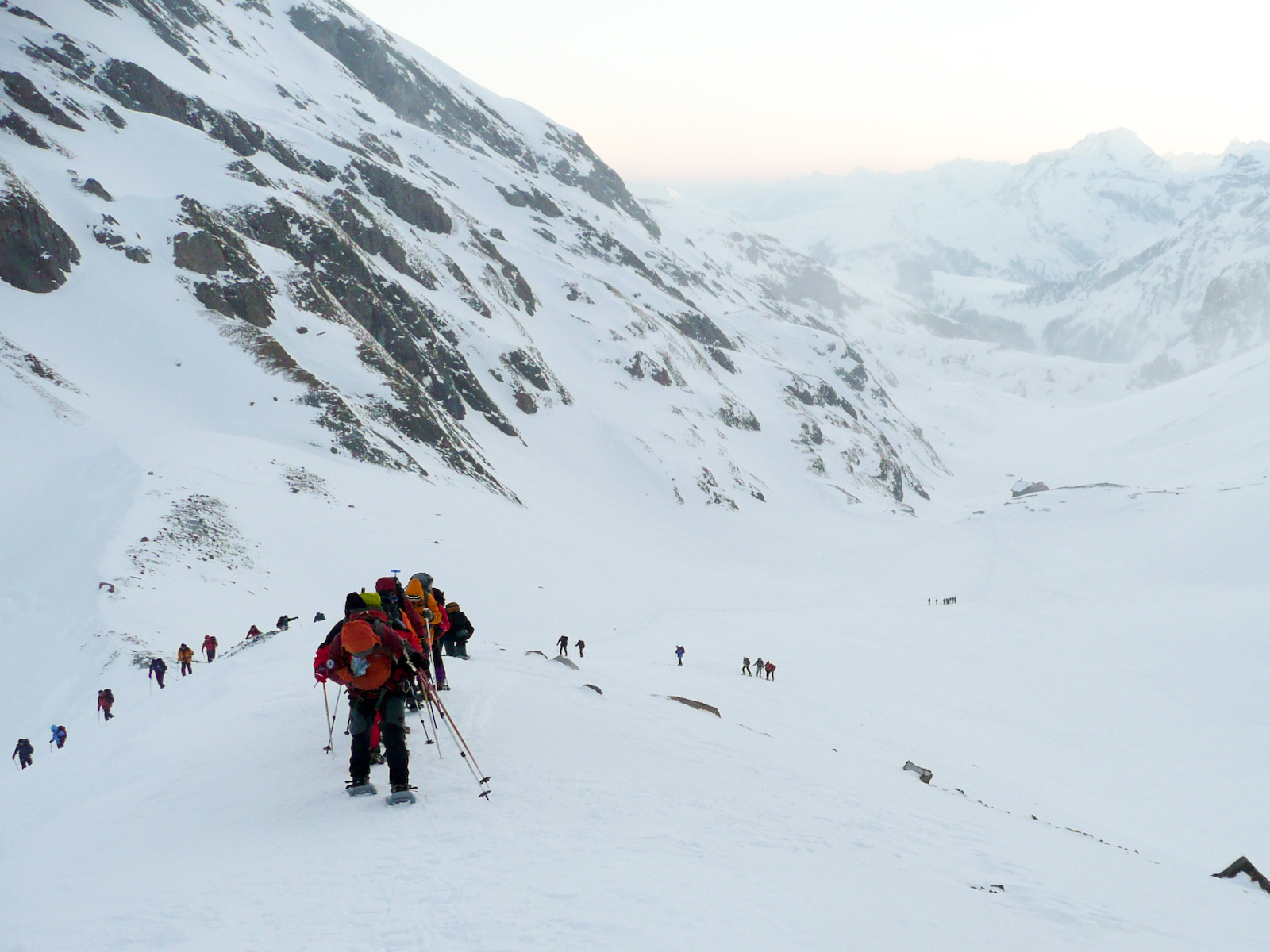
Ascent from the Wildhornhütte (right, middle) towards Wildhorn

== Maps ==
- 1:25'000 Blatt 1266 Lenk
- 1:50'000 Blatt 263 Wildstrubel
