= Schnidejoch =

Mountain pass in Bernese Alps, Switzerland

Coordinates: 46°22′10″N 7°23′17″E

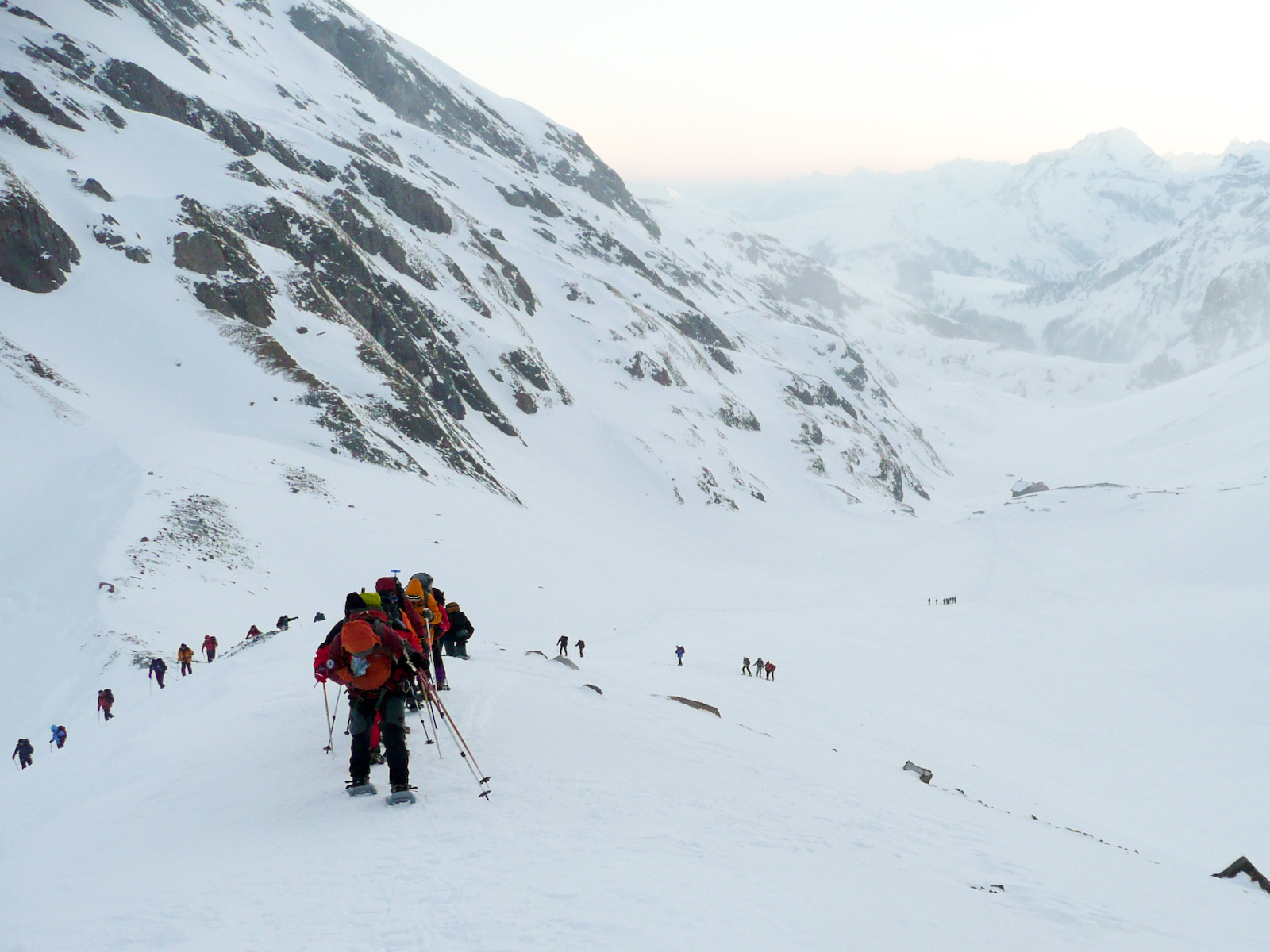
Descending to Wildhorn (March 2007).

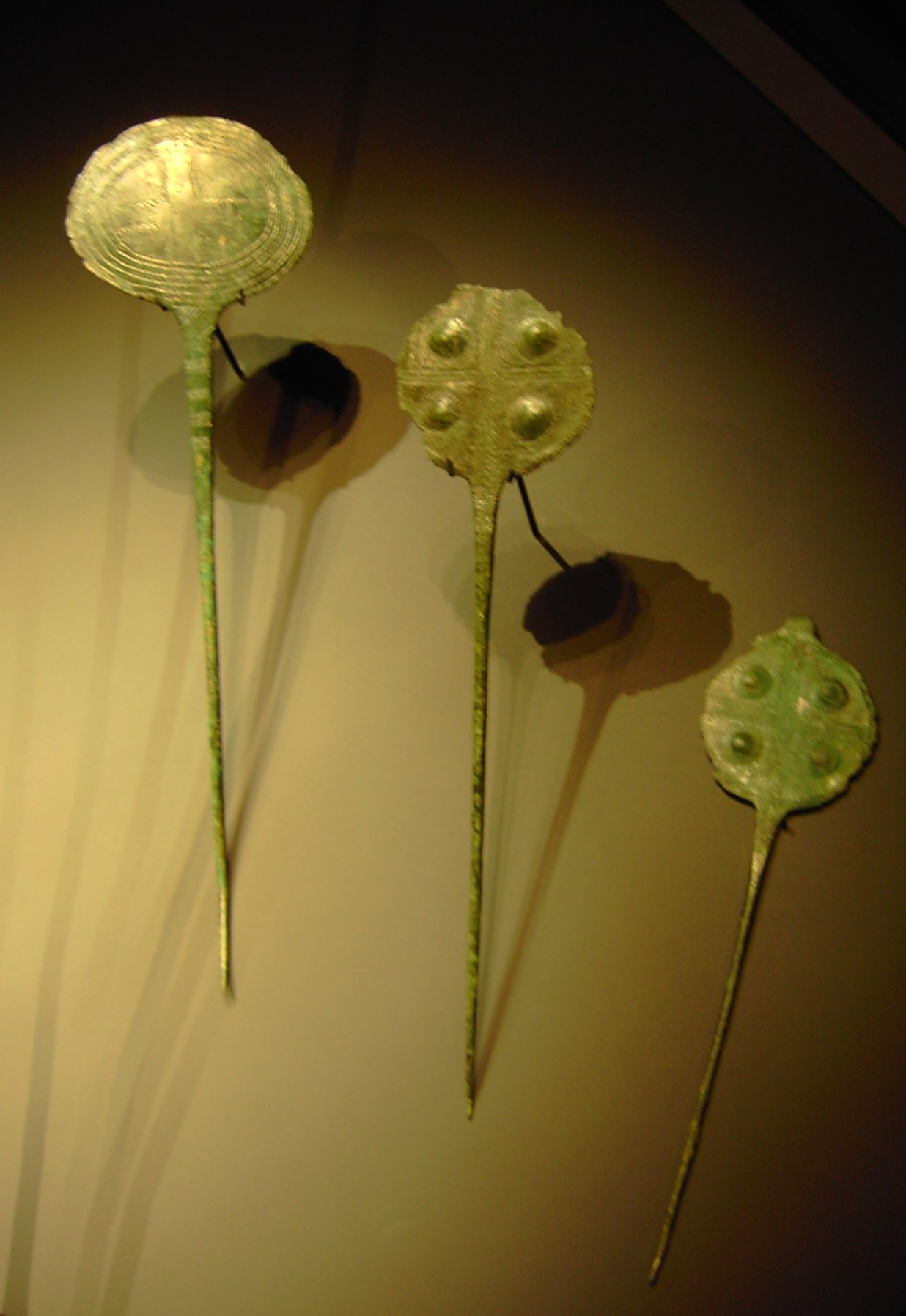
Early Bronze Age pins, the one found at Schnidejoch in the middle.

The Schnidejoch is a mountain pass in the Bernese Alps, at 2,756 m (9,042 ft) above sea level, cutting across the ridge connecting the Schnidehorn and the Wildhorn.

Archaeological artifacts, their dates spread over six millennia (from the Neolithic to the Late Middle Ages), have been discovered near the pass. They suggest that the pass was in regular use as a short route across the Bernese Alps, connecting the Bernese Oberland and the Valais, throughout this period. The nearest easier passes across the massif are the Sanetschpass (2,252 m (7,388 ft)) and the Rawilpass (2,429 m (7,969 ft)), situated a short distance to the west and east, respectively.

In September 2003, Bronze Age or Neolithic artifacts were discovered at the icefield just below the pass, at ca. 2,500 m (8,200 ft). The discovery was made possible by the melting away of the formerly permanent ice field during the exceptionally hot summer of 2003.

Further searches in 2004 and 2005 yielded more than 400 objects dating to various epochs, about half of them placed by carbon dating to between 29th and 27th centuries BC (Corded ware period). The objects include hunting weapons and clothing. A yew bow found at the site and taken home by a German tourist in 2003 was returned to the Bernese cantonal archaeologists in 2005.

The 3rd millennium dates of the oldest artifacts were revised to the mid 5th millennium BC (linear pottery period) in a 2008 press release. The revised dates would establish the artifacts as older than Ötzi the Iceman.
