= Six des Eaux Froides =

Mountain in Switzerland

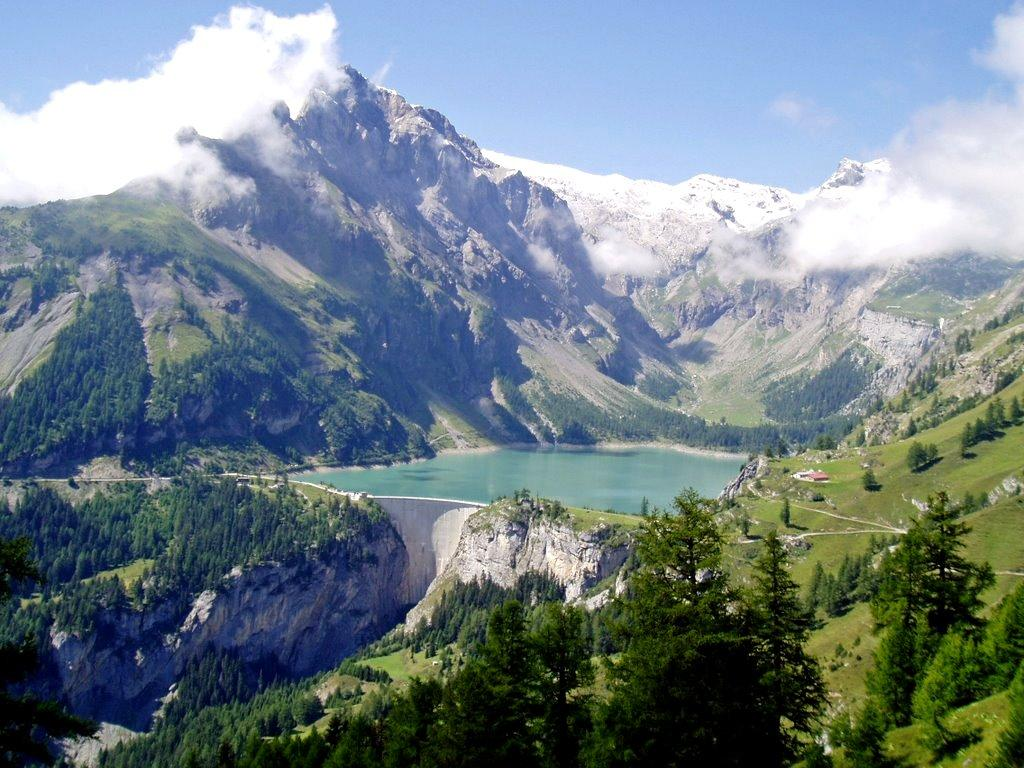
- Six des Eaux Froides (left) and Lac de Tseuzier

Highest point
- Elevation: 2,905 m (9,531 ft)
- Prominence: 257 m (843 ft)
- Parent peak: Wildhorn
- Coordinates: 46°20′49″N 7°24′12″E

Geography
- Location within Switzerland
- Location: Valais, Switzerland
- Parent range: Bernese Alps

The Six des Eaux Froides is a mountain of the Bernese Alps, located north of Anzère in the canton of Valais. It lies in the massif of the Wildhorn, between the Lac des Audannes and the Lac de Tseuzier.
