= Sex Rouge (Wildhorn) =

Mountain in Switzerland

- Location within Switzerland

Highest point
- Elevation: 2,893 m (9,491 ft)
- Prominence: 184 m (604 ft)
- Parent peak: Wildhorn
- Coordinates: 46°19′58.7″N 7°22′34.6″E

Geography
- Location: Valais, Switzerland
- Parent range: Bernese Alps

The Sex Rouge is a mountain of the Bernese Alps, located north of Anzère in the canton of Valais. It belongs to the massif of the Wildhorn massif and it overlooks the Lac des Audannes.

It should not be confused with another nearby peak of the same name; this other Sex Rouge is located just west of Oldenhorn and is the terminus of a cable car line serving the Glacier 3000 ski area adjacent to the Diablerets.

The name component "Sex" is etymologically derived from the Latin "saxum" (rock), see Sex (mountain name). In French, it is typically pronounced as "say", with the mountain name phonetically pronounced as "say rooj".
