= Prabé =

Mountain in Switzerland

- Location within Switzerland

Highest point
- Elevation: 2,042 m (6,699 ft)
- Prominence: 5 m (16 ft)
- Coordinates: 46°17′2.8″N 7°20′59.6″E

Geography
- Location: Valais, Switzerland
- Parent range: Bernese Alps

The Prabé (2,042 m) is a mountain of the Bernese Alps, overlooking Savièse in the canton of Valais. It lies at the southern end of the ridge that descends from the Wildhorn and the Sex Noir. Although the Prabé has almost no topographic prominence, it dominates the Rhone valley with a height of more than 1,500 metres.

A mountain hut is located near the summit at 1,982 metres.
