= Niesehorn =

Mountain in Switzerland

- Location within Switzerland

Highest point
- Elevation: 2,776 m (9,108 ft)
- Prominence: 281 m (922 ft)
- Parent peak: Wildhorn
- Coordinates: 46°22′55.7″N 7°22′26″E

Geography
- Location: Bern, Switzerland
- Parent range: Bernese Alps

The Niesehorn is a mountain of the Bernese Alps, located south of Lauenen and Lenk in the Bernese Oberland. It lies north of the Wildhorn, on the chain between the valleys of Saanen and Simmental.
