= Sex Noir =

Mountain in Switzerland

- Location within Switzerland

Highest point
- Elevation: 2,731 m (8,960 ft)
- Prominence: 148 m (486 ft)
- Parent peak: Wildhorn
- Coordinates: 46°19′3.9″N 7°21′26.4″E

Geography
- Location: Valais, Switzerland
- Parent range: Bernese Alps

The Sex Noir (2,731 m) is a mountain of the Bernese Alps, located north of Anzère in the canton of Valais. It belongs to the massif of the Wildhorn and lies approximately halfway between the summit of the Wildhorn and the Prabé, on the range separating the valley of La Morge from the valley of La Sionne. Both rivers end in the Rhone.
