= Gottlieb Samuel Studer =

Swiss mountaineer and notary

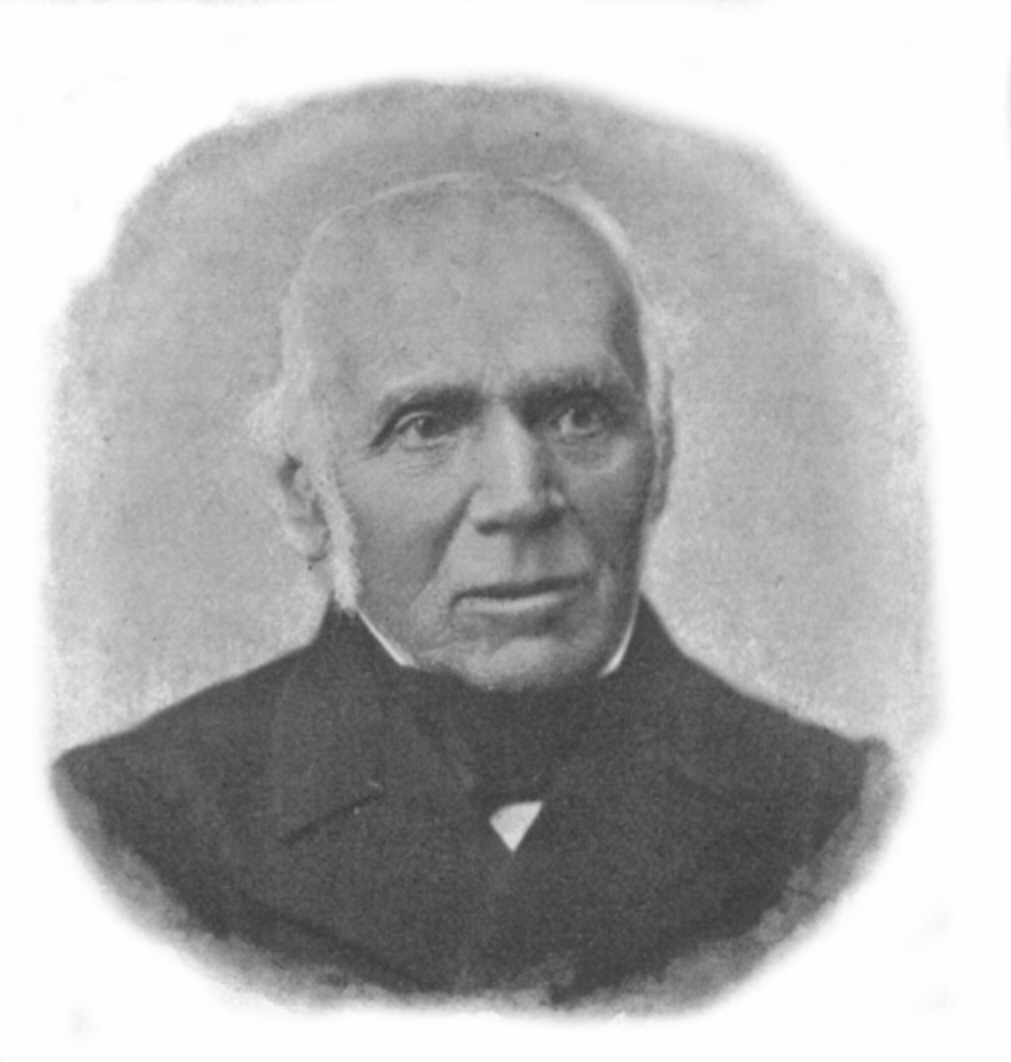
Gottlieb Samuel Studer

Gottlieb Samuel Studer (5 August 1804 in Langnau im Emmental – 22 December 1890 in Vienna) was a Swiss mountaineer, notary public and draughtsman.

Studer was the son of Sigmund Gottlieb Studer. After the death of his father, the Studer family moved to Bern, where Studer was secretary to the cantonal justice and police department, later becoming prefect (Regierungsstatthalter) of the city of Bern.

In September 1843 he made the first ascent of the Wildhorn (3,248 m) in the Bernese Alps.

Together with the geologist Theodor Simler and Dr Melchior Ulrich, Studer was inspired by the establishment of the British Alpine Club in 1857 to form a Swiss counterpart. This led to the founding on 19 April 1863 of the Swiss Alpine Club (SAC) at a meeting in the Bahnhofbuffet Olten, the railway restaurant in the Swiss town of Olten. The club was 'a broader and more democratic association than the Alpine Club'. Studer was president of the Bern section of the SAC from 1863–1873, and he was honorary president from 1873 to his death.

In 1866 Studer left the service of the state and dedicated himself to the history of Alpine exploration. The years 1869–1871 were spent writing Über Eis und Schnee, a three-volume history of the climbing of the Swiss Alps.

Over the course of 60 years Studer climbed 650 summits, in the Bernese Alps, the Pennine Alps, the Dauphiné, the Tyrol, the Pyrenees and Norway. At the age of 68 he climbed Mont Blanc; when he was 79 he climbed Pic d'Arzinol in the Valais; and at 81 the Niederhorn.

== Bibliography ==
- Berg- und Gletscherfahrten in den Hochalpen der Schweiz, 2 volumes, Zürich 1859–1863
- Über Eis und Schnee, Bern 1869–1871
  - Vol. 1: Nordalpen, pp. 535
  - Vol. 2: Südalpen, pp. 580
  - Vol. 3: Südalpen, Ostalpen, pp. 508
