= Gottfried Strasser =

Swiss pastor and writer

- Born: 3 December 1854; Lauenen, Switzerland
- Died: 9 April 1912 (aged 57); Grindelwald, Switzerland
- Occupations: Pastor, writer, and poet

Gottfried Strasser (12 March 1854 – 9 April 1912) was a Swiss Protestant pastor, poet, and writer.
