= Geltenhorn =

Mountain in Switzerland

- Location within Switzerland

Highest point
- Elevation: 3,062 m (10,046 ft)
- Prominence: 305 m (1,001 ft)
- Parent peak: Wildhorn
- Listing: Alpine mountains above 3000 m
- Coordinates: 46°20′47″N 7°20′4″E

Geography
- Location: Bern/Valais, Switzerland
- Parent range: Bernese Alps

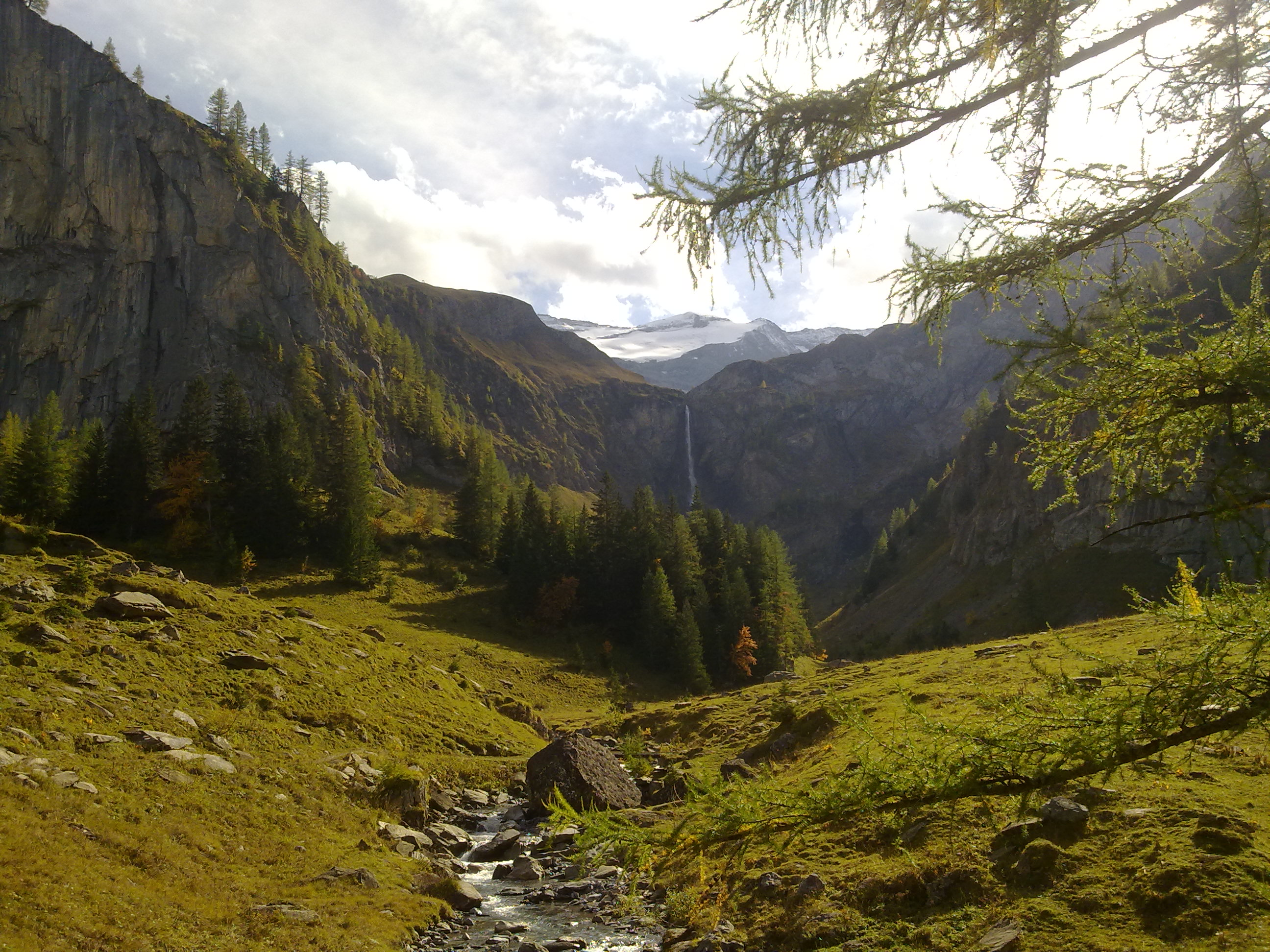
Geltenhorn at the end of the valley

The Geltenhorn (also spelled Gältehore) is a mountain of the Bernese Alps, located on the border between the Swiss cantons of Bern and Valais. It belongs to the massif of the Wildhorn and lies approximately halfway between the Arpelistock and the summit of the Wildhorn.

The north side of the Geltenhorn is covered by a glacier named Geltengletscher.
