= Wildhorn =

Mountain in Switzerland

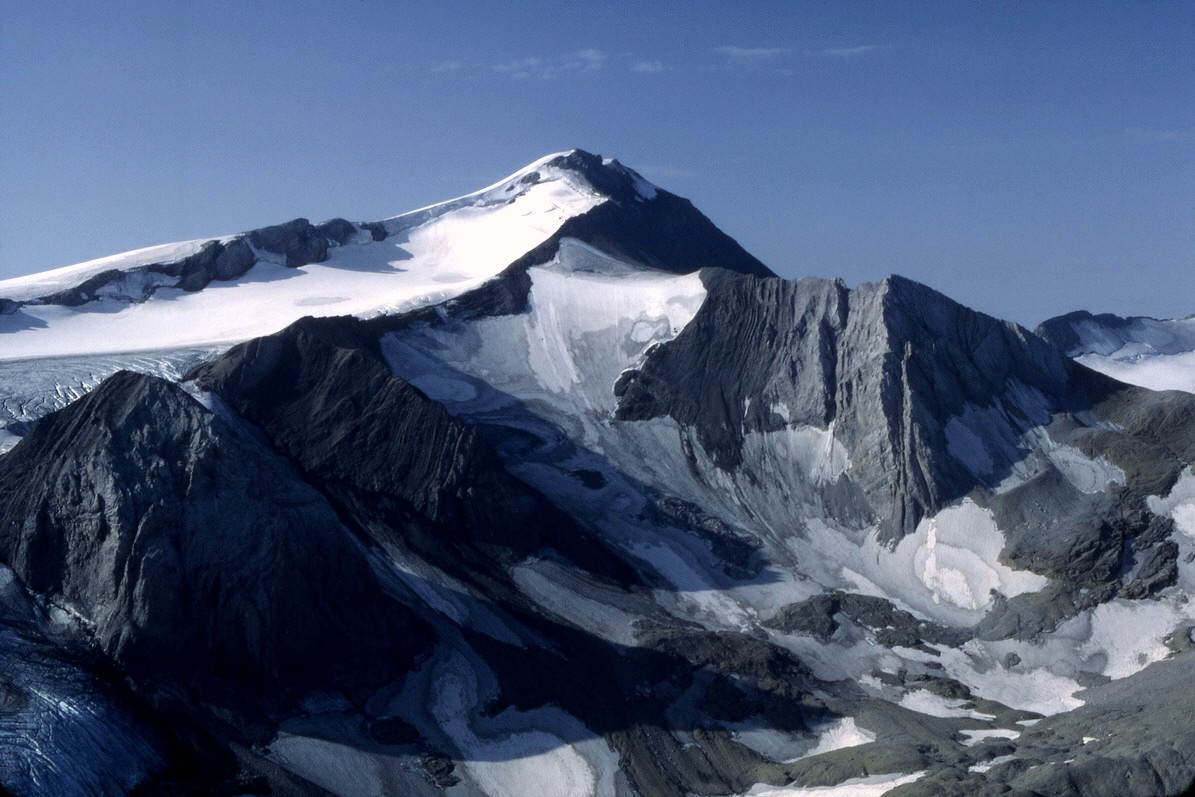
- View from the north side

Highest point
- Elevation: 3,250 m (10,660 ft)
- Prominence: 981 m (3,219 ft)
- Parent peak: Finsteraarhorn
- Isolation: 22.9 km (14.2 mi)
- Listing: Alpine mountains above 3000 m
- Coordinates: 46°21′16.5″N 7°21′39.1″E

Geography
- Location within Switzerland
- Location: Bern/Valais, Switzerland
- Parent range: Bernese Alps

Climbing
- First ascent: September 1843 by Gottlieb Samuel Studer

The Wildhorn is a mountain of the Alps, straddling the border between the Swiss cantons of Bern and Valais. At 3,250 metres (10,663 ft) above sea level, it is the highest summit of the Bernese Alps west of the Gemmi Pass. It forms a large glaciated massif, about 10 km wide, extending between the Sanetsch Pass and the Rawil Pass. Along with the Muverans, the Diablerets and the Wildstrubel, the Wildhorn is one of the four distinct mountain massifs of the Bernese Alps that lie west of the Gemmi Pass. The massif of the Wildhorn is at the centre between the valleys of the Saane, Simme (both canton of Bern) and the Rhone (Valais). It comprises several distinct summits, including (from west to east) the Arpelistock, Le Sérac, the Geltenhorn, the Sex Noir, the Sex Rouge, the Schnidehorn and the Six des Eaux Froides. The main crest is between the glaciers named Tungelgletscher and Glacier du Wildhorn. South of the main summit is the almost equally high summit of Mont Pucel (3,177 m). The Wildhorn is surrounded by several large mountain lakes: the Lac de Sénin, the Lauenensee, the Iffigsee, the Lac de Tseuzier and the Lac des Audannes. The Tungelgletscher, on the north-east face, was measured as 1.9 km in length in 1973.

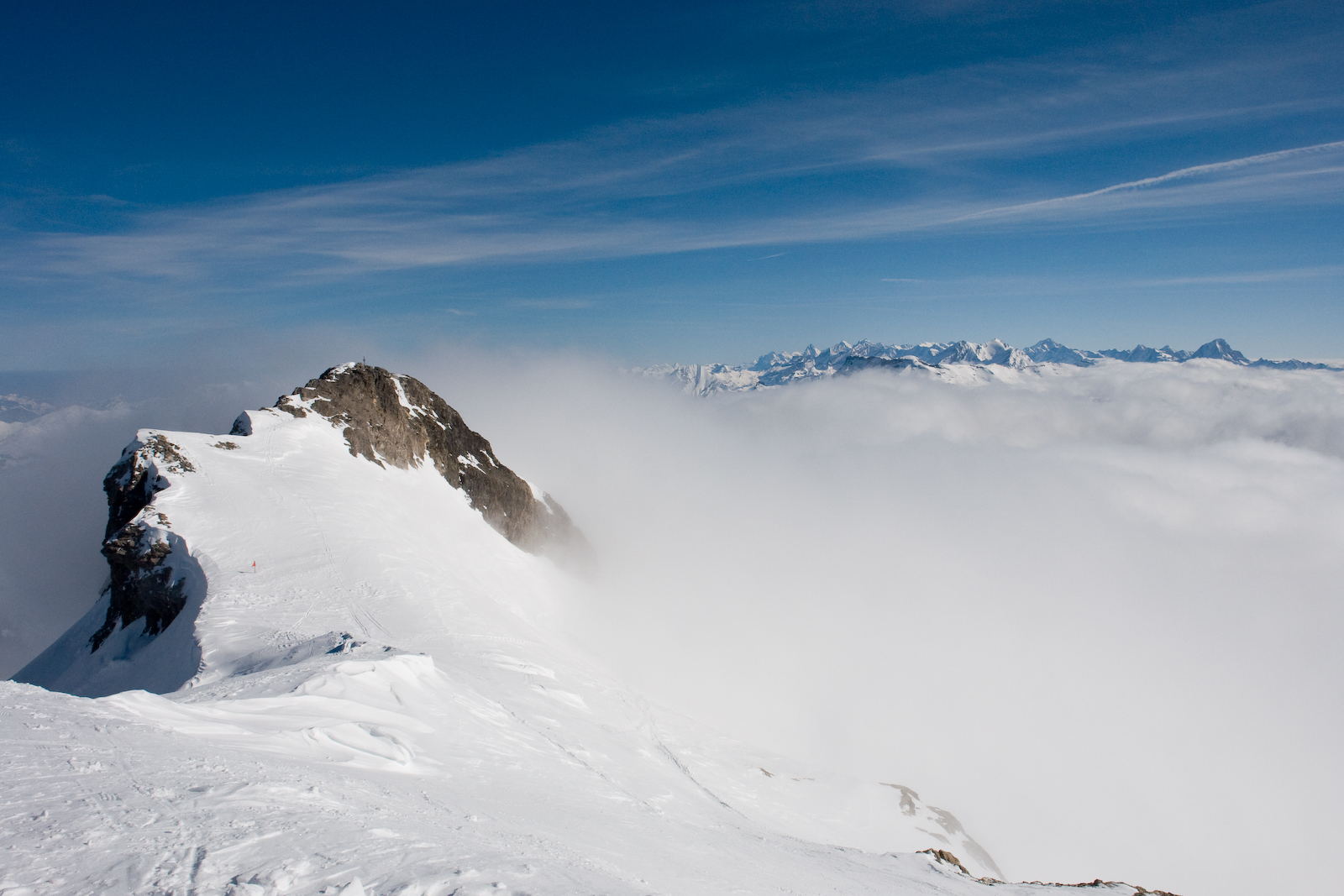
View from the summit

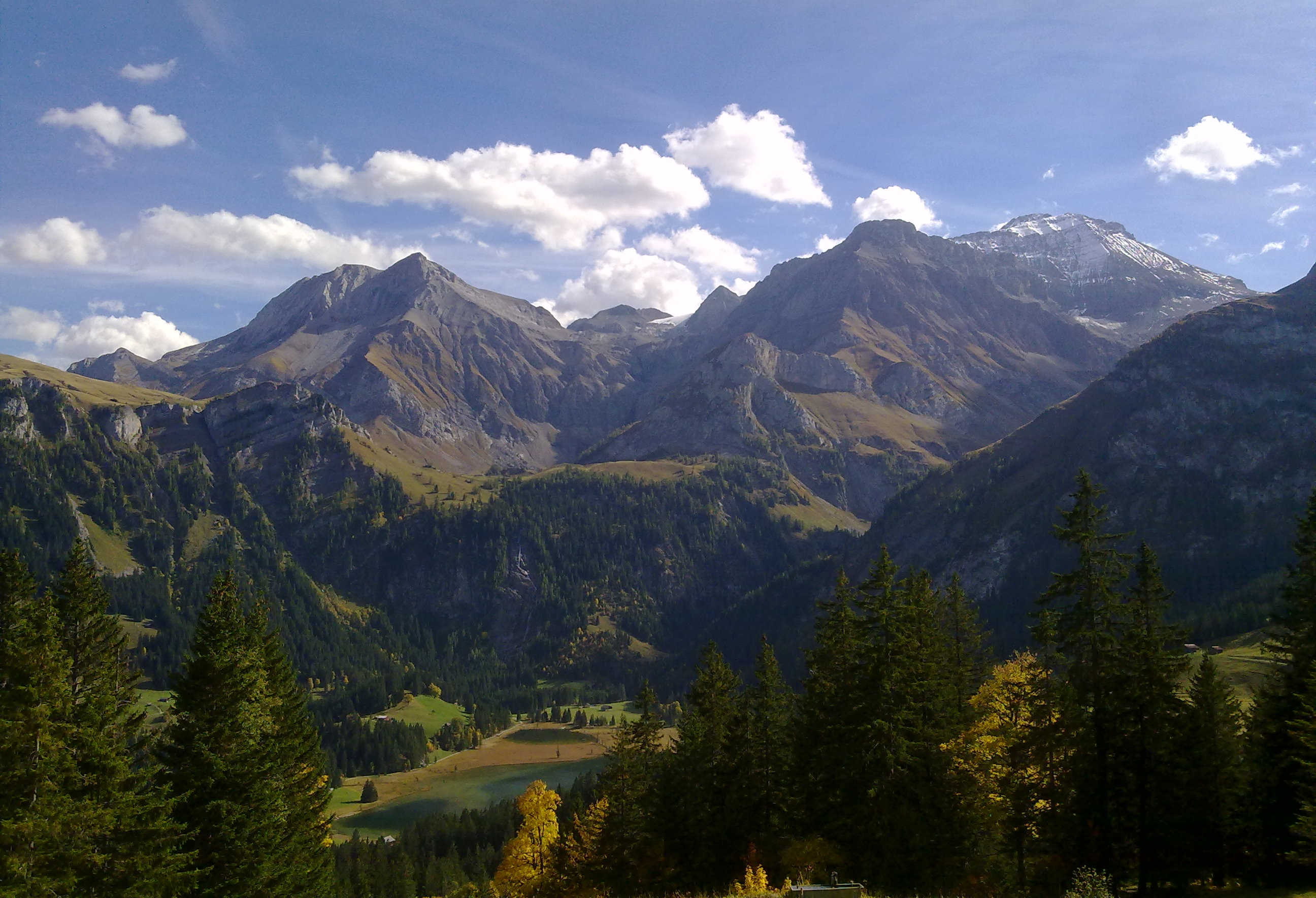
The Wildhorn from the Lauenen valley

The Wildhorn lies approximately halfway between Gstaad (BE; 14 km away), Sion (VS; 14 km) and Lenk (BE; 13 km), its summit being in the municipalities of Lauenen (BE), Savièse (VS) and Ayent (VS). The nearest settlements are Lauenen, Anzère (Ayent) and Gsteig bei Gstaad. The highest place in the massif that can be easily reached is the Pas de Maimbré station (2,362 m), which is connected to Anzère by a gondola lift.

As for the other mountains on the crest of the Bernese Alps, the slopes of the Wildhorn experience different types of climate depending on their location: the northern slopes are cooler and wetter while the southern slopes are drier and warmer. Forests are found up to 1,800 metres on the north side and up to 2,100 metres on the south side. Glaciers also reach significantly lower locations on the north side. Vineyards are also very common on the Valais side, especially below 1000 metres, but completely absent on the Bernese side, where alpine pastures dominate the landscape, as in many other areas of the Bernese Oberland.

The ascent of the Wildhorn involves either glacier crossings or technical climbs. The Swiss Alpine Club maintains the Wildhornhütte shelter (2,303 m) in the Iffigtal, above the Iffigsee, on the northern slopes of the mountain. The easiest ascent (a glacier tour) starts from there. Another hut, the Cabane des Audannes (2,505 m) is located near the Lac des Audannes on the south side. More challenging ascents commence from the Geltenhütte (2,759 m), above the Col du Brochet. The first ascent was made by Gottlieb Samuel Studer in September 1843.

== See also ==
- List of most isolated mountains of Switzerland
- Geography of the Alps
