= Le Sérac =

Mountain in Switzerland

- Location within Switzerland

Highest point
- Elevation: 2,817 m (9,242 ft)
- Prominence: 257 m (843 ft)
- Parent peak: Wildhorn
- Coordinates: 46°19′34.8″N 7°19′46″E

Geography
- Location: Valais, Switzerland
- Parent range: Bernese Alps

Le Sérac is a mountain of the Bernese Alps, located near the Sanetsch Pass in the canton of Valais. It belongs to the Wildhorn massif.
