= Iffigsee =

Alpine lake in Switzerland

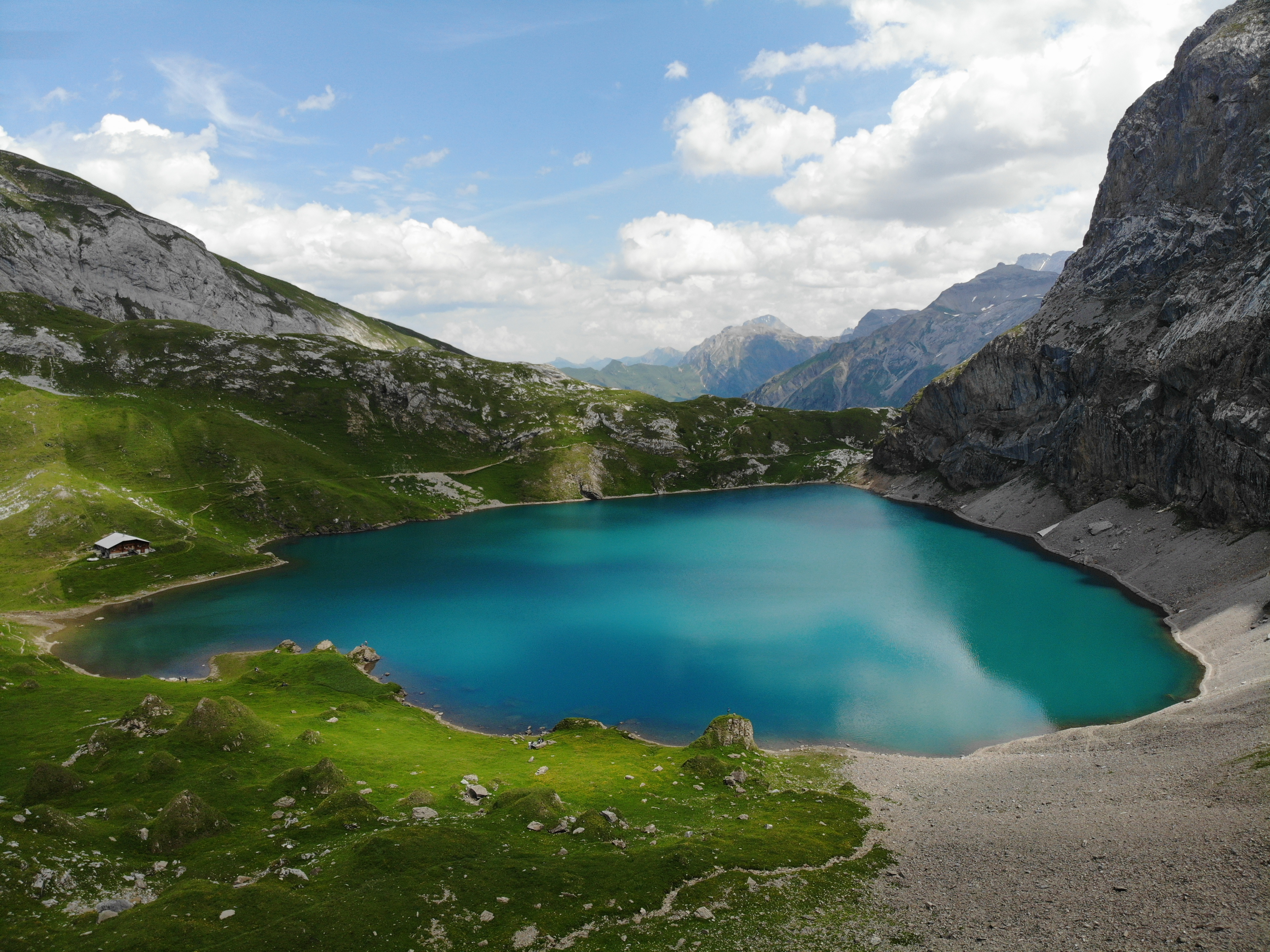

- Location within Canton of Bern Location within Switzerland Location within Alps
- Interactive map of Iffigsee
- Location: Canton of Bern
- Coordinates: 46°23′11.5″N 7°24′23.5″E
- Basin countries: Switzerland
- Surface area: 11 ha (27 acres)
- Surface elevation: 2,065 m (6,775 ft)

Iffigsee is a lake near Lenk, in the canton of Bern, Switzerland. The lake is located in the Iffigtal, near Rawil Pass. To the south of the lake is the Wildhorn (3,248 metres).

== See also ==
- List of mountain lakes of Switzerland
