= Schnidehorn =

Mountain in Switzerland

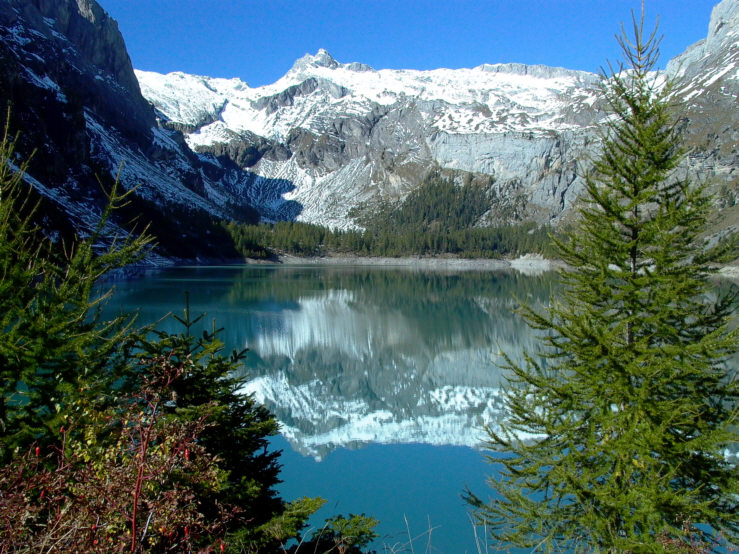
- The Schnidehorn (centre-left) from the lake of Tseuzier (south side)

Highest point
- Elevation: 2,937 m (9,636 ft)
- Prominence: 181 m (594 ft)
- Parent peak: Wildhorn
- Coordinates: 46°22′22.6″N 7°23′33.7″E

Geography
- Location within Switzerland
- Location: Bern/Valais, Switzerland
- Parent range: Bernese Alps

The Schnidehorn is a mountain of the Bernese Alps, located on the border between the Swiss cantons of Bern and Valais. It lies in the massif of the Wildhorn, west of the Rawil Pass. A ridge connects the Schnidehorn and the Wildhorn to the southwest, via the Schnidejoch.
