= Arpelistock =

Mountain in Switzerland

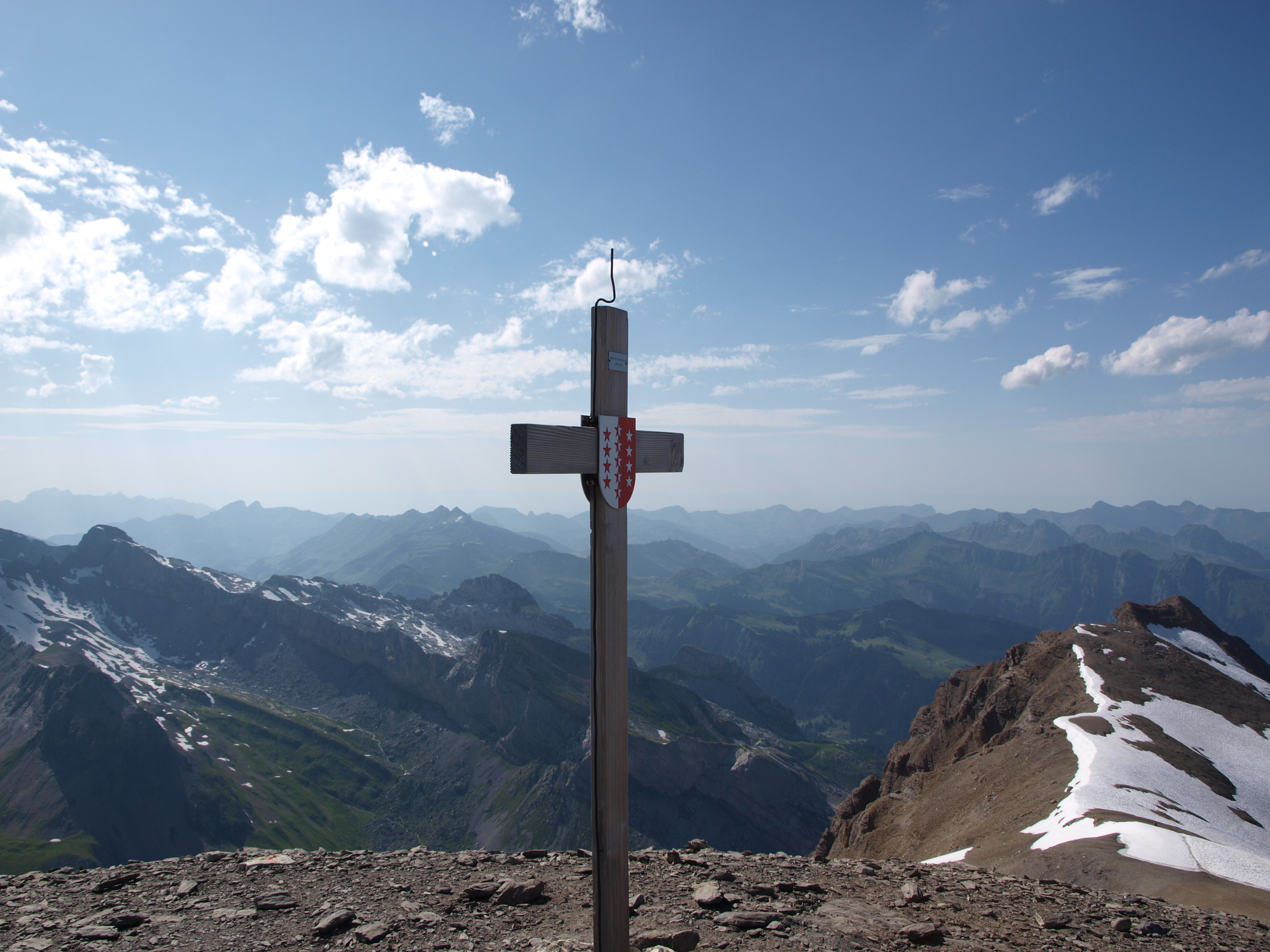
- View from summit

Highest point
- Elevation: 3,036 m (9,961 ft)
- Prominence: 66 m (217 ft)
- Parent peak: Geltenhorn
- Coordinates: 46°20′37.8″N 7°18′55.3″E

Geography
- Location within Switzerland
- Location: Bern/Valais, Switzerland
- Parent range: Bernese Alps

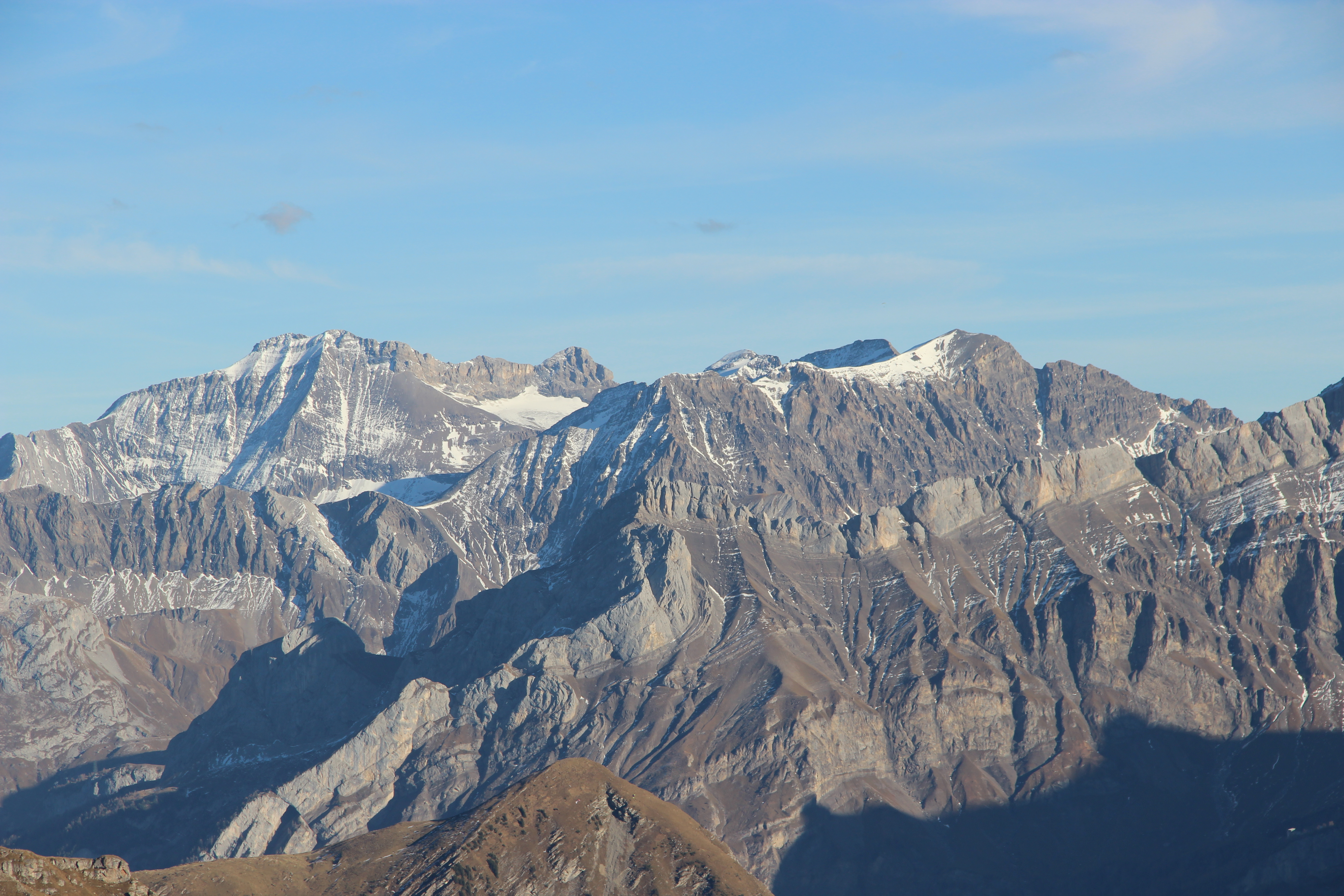
Wildhorn and Arpelistock

The Arpelistock is a mountain of the Bernese Alps, located on the border between the Swiss cantons of Bern and Valais. It belongs to the massif of the Wildhorn and lies approximately halfway between the Sanetsch Pass and the summit of the Wildhorn.

The north side of the Arpelistock is covered by a glacier named Geltengletscher.
