= Lenk im Simmental =

- Municipality
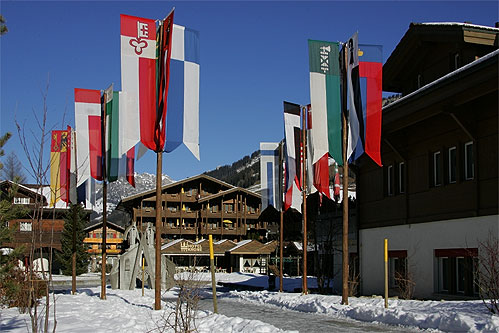

- Flag Coat of arms
- Location of Lenk im Simmental
- Location within Switzerland Location within Canton of Bern
- Coordinates: 46°27′N 7°26′E
- Country: Switzerland
- Canton: Bern
- District: Obersimmental-Saanen

Area
  - Total: 123.1 km^{2} (47.5 sq mi)
- Elevation: 1,068 m (3,504 ft)

Population (Dec 2011)
  - Total: 2,450
  - Density: 19.9/km^{2} (51.5/sq mi)
- Time zone: UTC+01:00 (CET)
  - Summer (DST): UTC+02:00 (CEST)
- Postal code: 3775
- SFOS number: 792
- ISO 3166 code: CH-BE
- Surrounded by: Adelboden, Ayent (VS), Icogne (VS), Lauenen, Leukerbad (VS), Mollens (VS), Randogne (VS), Saanen, Sankt Stephan
- Website: www.lenkgemeinde.ch

Lenk im Simmental (or simply Lenk) is a municipality in the Obersimmental-Saanen administrative district in the canton of Bern in Switzerland.

== History ==
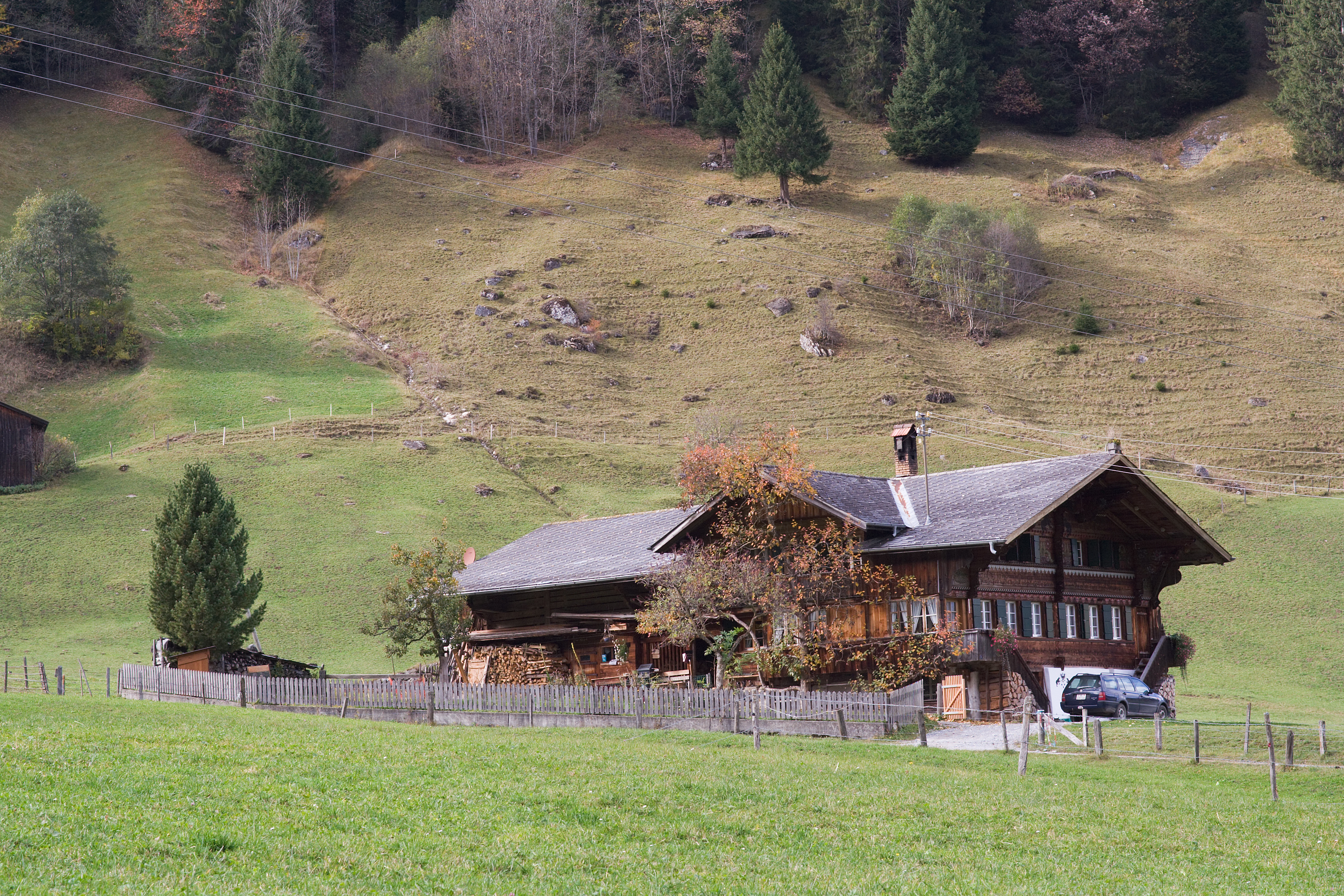
Chalet in Pöschenried

Lenk is first mentioned in 1370 as An der Leng.

The oldest traces of a settlement in the area come from neolithic artifacts that have been found scattered around the municipality. During the Bronze Age Burgbühl and Bürstehubel were both fortified. Under the Romans the area was on along a major north–south road that passed over the Rawil and Kaltwasser Passes. They built a way station and a small shrine at the Iffigsee and a road and lime kiln at Iffigenalp. By the Middle Ages the Bronze Age fortifications were reoccupied and the area was split between the Herrschaft of Mannenberg and the estates of the Freiherr von Raron. The lands passed through several owners and by 1502 Bern ruled over the lands of the modern municipality. The municipality split from the neighboring St. Stephan in 1504–1505. In 1522 it achieved its sovereignty in the canton of Bern.

The village church was built in 1505. The church became a parish church in 1513. In 1528, the city of Bern accepted the new faith of the Protestant Reformation. Lenk, along with much of the Oberland, initially resisted the new faith but was forced to accept it in the same year. In the following year, Lenk had to protect itself against the Catholic Valais. The conflicts over religion closed the Rawil Pass into Valais for a time. However, the Pass remained an important trade route until the construction of the Lötschberg railway line in 1913. In 1878 much of the village was destroyed in a fire. The parish church rebuilt three years later in 1881.

In the mid 19th century tourists began to come to Lenk to see the natural attractions and to bathe in the mineral springs. A medicinal spa opened in 1843 and gradually expanded into a grand hotel by 1900. In 1969 the old hotel was replaced with a new spa and indoor pool. Today tourism is the main industry in Lenk. A number of second homes and vacation chalets were built outside the old village center.

== Geography ==
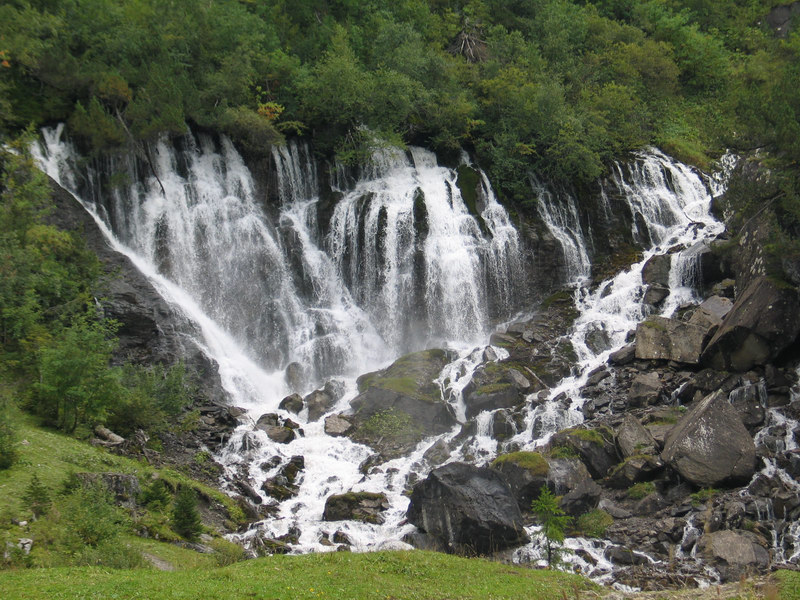
The Siebenbrunnen falls

Aerial view of Lenk with Wildstrubel (1957)

Lenk has an area of 122.96 km^{2} (47.48 sq mi). As of 2012, a total of 44.82 km^{2} (17.31 mi^{2}) or 36.4% is used for agricultural purposes, while 28.32 km^{2} (10.93 mi^{2}) or 23.0% is forested. The rest of the municipality is 2.4 km^{2} (0.93 mi^{2}) or 2.0% is settled (buildings or roads), 1.12 km^{2} (0.43 mi^{2}) or 0.9% is either rivers or lakes and 46.38 km^{2} (17.91 mi^{2}) or 37.7% is unproductive land.

During the same year, housing and buildings made up 1.1% and transportation infrastructure made up 0.7%. A total of 17.7% of the total land area is heavily forested and 3.6% is covered with orchards or small clusters of trees. Of the agricultural land, 7.9% is pasturage and 28.5% is used for alpine pastures. Of the water in the municipality, 0.2% is in lakes and 0.7% is in rivers and streams. Of the unproductive areas, 5.8% is unproductive vegetation, 23.4% is too rocky for vegetation and 8.5% of the land is covered by glaciers.

It lies in the Simmental valley of the Bernese Oberland. Lenk lies 80 km (50 mi) from Bern and 100 km (62 mi) from Montreux.

Lenk is the highest municipality in Simmental. The municipal area includes many mountains, the highest of which is the Wildstrubel (3,243 m (10,640 ft)). Somewhat below the Wildstrubel, by the Siebenbrunnen ("seven fountains") comes the Simme River, which gives Simmental ("Simme Valley") its name. A number of creeks flow into the Simme, and the Iffig Creek, the Iffigfall (its waterfall), and the Iffigsee (its lake) are attractions for hikers. Other mountains nearby include the Wildhorn (3248 m) and Niesehorn (2776 m), commonly reached via trekking routes that begin in Lenk.

The large municipality includes the cooperative farms (Bäuerten) of Aegerten and Brand as well as the villages of Lenk, Gutenbrunnen, Ober- and Pöschenried.

On 31 December 2009 Amtsbezirk Obersimmental, the municipality's former district, was dissolved. On the following day, 1 January 2010, it joined the newly created Verwaltungskreis Obersimmental-Saanen.

== Coat of arms ==
The blazon of the municipal coat of arms is Per fess Vert a Semi-Plate issuant from the Chief from which are flowing towards base seven streams of the same and Gules a Sword and a Distaff both of the second in Saltire. The seven streams represent the Siebenbrunnen falls or seven sources of the Simme river.

== Demographics ==
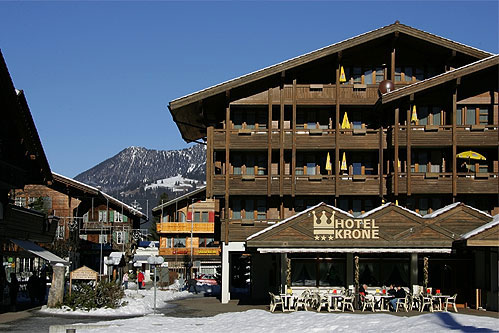
Hotel Krone and Kronenplatz in Lenk

Lenk has a population (as of December 2020) of 2,314. As of 2011, 14.5% of the population are resident foreign nationals. Over the last year (2010–2011) the population has changed at a rate of 2.1%. Migration accounted for 1.5%, while births and deaths accounted for 0.2%.

Most of the population (as of 2000) speaks German (2,201 or 94.2%) as their first language, Serbo-Croatian is the second most common (36 or 1.5%) and Portuguese is the third (27 or 1.2%). There are 14 people who speak French, 5 people who speak Italian and 5 people who speak Romansh.

As of 2008, the population was 49.5% male and 50.5% female. The population was made up of 1,022 Swiss men (42.6% of the population) and 166 (6.9%) non-Swiss men. There were 1,078 Swiss women (44.9%) and 133 (5.5%) non-Swiss women. Of the population in the municipality, 1,177 or about 50.4% were born in Lenk and lived there in 2000. There were 613 or 26.2% who were born in the same canton, while 238 or 10.2% were born somewhere else in Switzerland, and 216 or 9.2% were born outside of Switzerland.

As of 2011, children and teenagers (0–19 years old) make up 18.4% of the population, while adults (20–64 years old) make up 62.2% and seniors (over 64 years old) make up 19.4%.

As of 2000, there were 953 people who were single and never married in the municipality. There were 1,157 married individuals, 161 widows or widowers and 66 individuals who are divorced.

As of 2010, there were 348 households that consist of only one person and 70 households with five or more people. In 2000, a total of 876 apartments (35.0% of the total) were permanently occupied, while 1,514 apartments (60.5%) were seasonally occupied and 111 apartments (4.4%) were empty. The vacancy rate for the municipality, in 2010, was 0.3%. In 2011, single family homes made up 29.6% of the total housing in the municipality.

The historical population is given in the following chart:

== Politics ==
In the 2011 federal election the most popular party was the Swiss People's Party (SVP) which received 48.3% of the vote. The next three most popular parties were the Conservative Democratic Party (BDP) (16%), the Social Democratic Party (SP) (9.3%) and the FDP.The Liberals (8.8%). In the federal election, a total of 904 votes were cast, and the voter turnout was 48.7%.

== Economy ==
As of 2011, Lenk had an unemployment rate of 1.65%. As of 2008, there were a total of 1,584 people employed in the municipality. Of these, there were 350 people employed in the primary economic sector and about 121 businesses involved in this sector. 264 people were employed in the secondary sector and there were 43 businesses in this sector. 970 people were employed in the tertiary sector, with 129 businesses in this sector. There were 1,267 residents of the municipality who were employed in some capacity, of which females made up 42.9% of the workforce.

In 2008 there were a total of 1,230 full-time equivalent jobs. The number of jobs in the primary sector was 201, of which 178 were in agriculture and 23 were in forestry or lumber production. The number of jobs in the secondary sector was 241 of which 86 or (35.7%) were in manufacturing and 150 (62.2%) were in construction. The number of jobs in the tertiary sector was 788. In the tertiary sector; 136 or 17.3% were in wholesale or retail sales or the repair of motor vehicles, 30 or 3.8% were in the movement and storage of goods, 444 or 56.3% were in a hotel or restaurant, 10 or 1.3% were the insurance or financial industry, 36 or 4.6% were technical professionals or scientists, 22 or 2.8% were in education and 39 or 4.9% were in health care.

In 2000, there were 268 workers who commuted into the municipality and 203 workers who commuted away. The municipality is a net importer of workers, with about 1.3 workers entering the municipality for every one leaving. A total of 1,064 workers (79.9% of the 1,332 total workers in the municipality) both lived and worked in Lenk. Of the working population, 6.1% used public transportation to get to work, and 44.6% used a private car.

In 2011 the average local and cantonal tax rate on a married resident, with two children, of Lenk making 150,000 CHF was 13.2%, while an unmarried resident's rate was 19.4%. For comparison, the average rate for the entire canton in the same year, was 14.2% and 22.0%, while the nationwide average was 12.3% and 21.1% respectively.

In 2009 there were a total of 989 tax payers in the municipality. Of that total, 248 made over 75,000 CHF per year. There were 11 people who made between 15,000 and 20,000 per year. The greatest number of workers, 266, made between 50,000 and 75,000 CHF per year. The average income of the over 75,000 CHF group in Lenk was 113,484 CHF, while the average across all of Switzerland was 130,478 CHF.

In 2011 a total of 1.3% of the population received direct financial assistance from the government.

== Religion ==
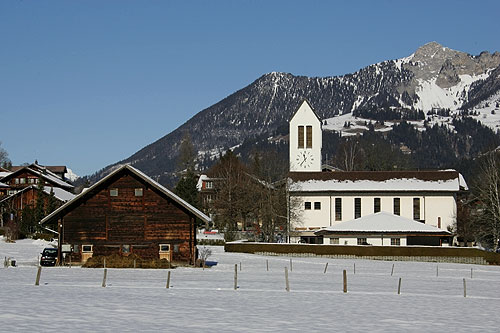
Village church in Lenk

From the 2000 census, 1,794 or 76.8% belonged to the Swiss Reformed Church, while 181 or 7.7% were Roman Catholic. Of the rest of the population, there were 57 members of an Orthodox church (or about 2.44% of the population), and there were 108 individuals (or about 4.62% of the population) who belonged to another Christian church. There were 25 (or about 1.07% of the population) who were Muslim. There were 4 individuals who were Hindu. 95 (or about 4.07% of the population) belonged to no church, are agnostic or atheist, and 73 individuals (or about 3.12% of the population) did not answer the question.

== Education ==
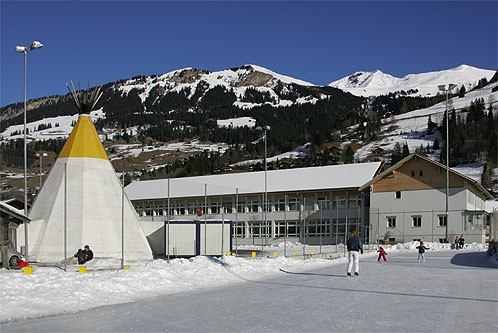
School building and ice rink/tennis court in Lenk

In Lenk about 52.1% of the population have completed non-mandatory upper secondary education, and 12.4% have completed additional higher education (either university or a Fachhochschule). Of the 179 who had completed some form of tertiary schooling listed in the census, 73.2% were Swiss men, 17.9% were Swiss women, 6.7% were non-Swiss men.

The Canton of Bern school system provides one year of non-obligatory Kindergarten, followed by six years of Primary school. This is followed by three years of obligatory lower Secondary school where the students are separated according to ability and aptitude. Following the lower Secondary students may attend additional schooling or they may enter an apprenticeship.

During the 2011–12 school year, there were a total of 203 students attending classes in Lenk. There were 2 kindergarten classes with a total of 26 students in the municipality. Of the kindergarten students, 7.7% were permanent or temporary residents of Switzerland (not citizens) and 3.8% have a different mother language than the classroom language. The municipality had 6 primary classes and 112 students. Of the primary students, 10.7% were permanent or temporary residents of Switzerland (not citizens) and 9.8% have a different mother language than the classroom language. During the same year, there were 3 lower secondary classes with a total of 65 students. There were 15.4% who were permanent or temporary residents of Switzerland (not citizens) and 15.4% have a different mother language than the classroom language.

As of 2000, there were a total of 265 students attending any school in the municipality. Of those, 253 both lived and attended school in the municipality, while 12 students came from another municipality. During the same year, 78 residents attended schools outside the municipality.

Lenk is home to the Gemeindebibliothek Lenk (municipal library of Lenk). The library has (as of 2008) 4,698 books or other media, and loaned out 9,570 items in the same year. It was open a total of 304 days with average of 6 hours per week during that year.

== Tourism ==
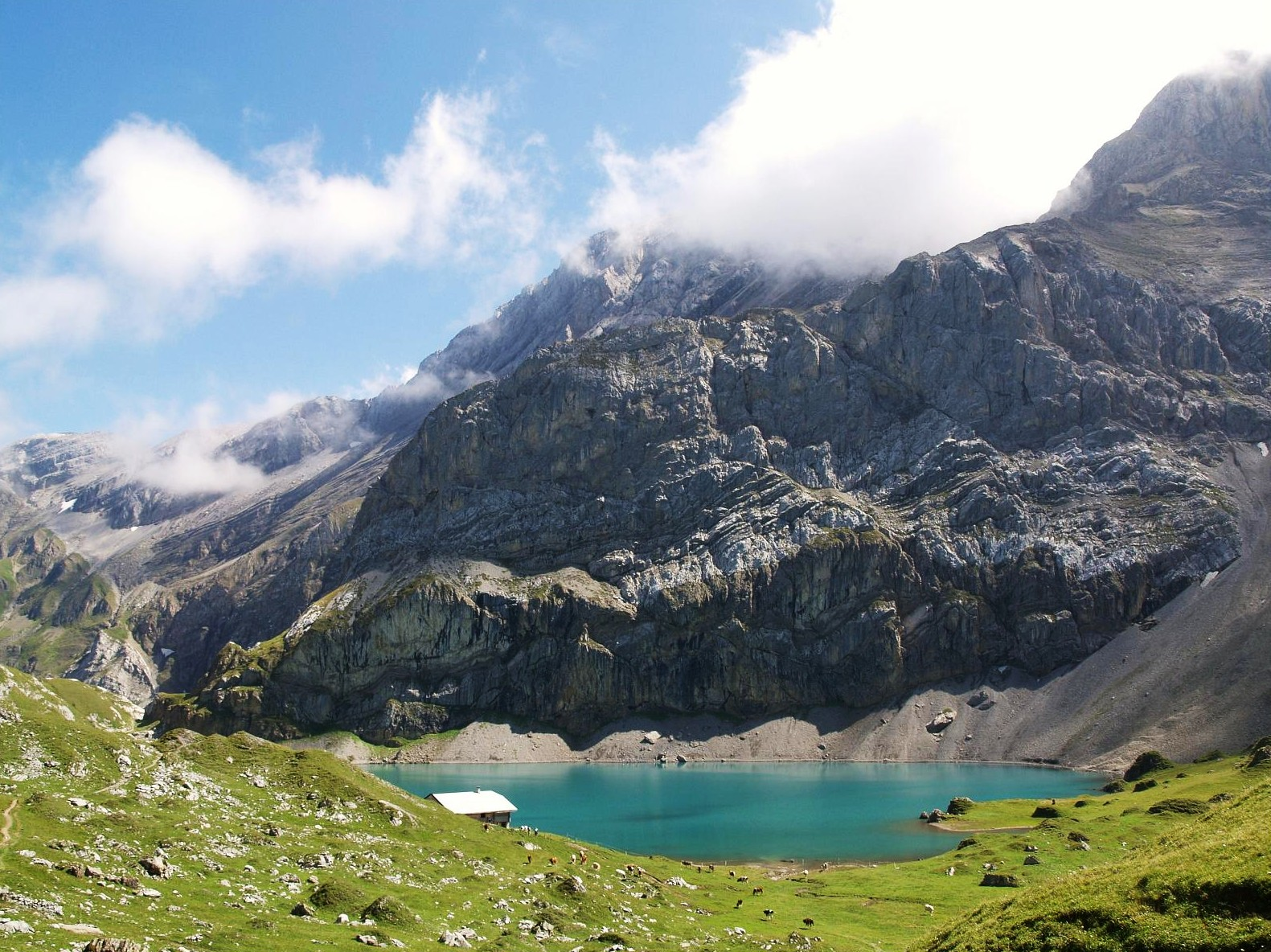
Iffigsee

The municipality is dependent on tourism, especially for winter sports. Lenk has accommodations for about 5000 guests, include 800 hotel beds. This is in a town of scarcely 2000. It is home to a ski resort, which operates on both sides of the valley in which it is located. Lenk is connected by rail to the town of Zweisimmen.

In 2010, the Swiss College of Hospitality Management (SHML), Switzerland's first Boutique Hotel Management College will open in Lenk. Courses are taught in English and include several undergraduate as well as a post-graduate and MBA degrees.

There also is a five star hotel called the Lenkerhof.
