= Pic d'Artsinol =

Mountain in Switzerland

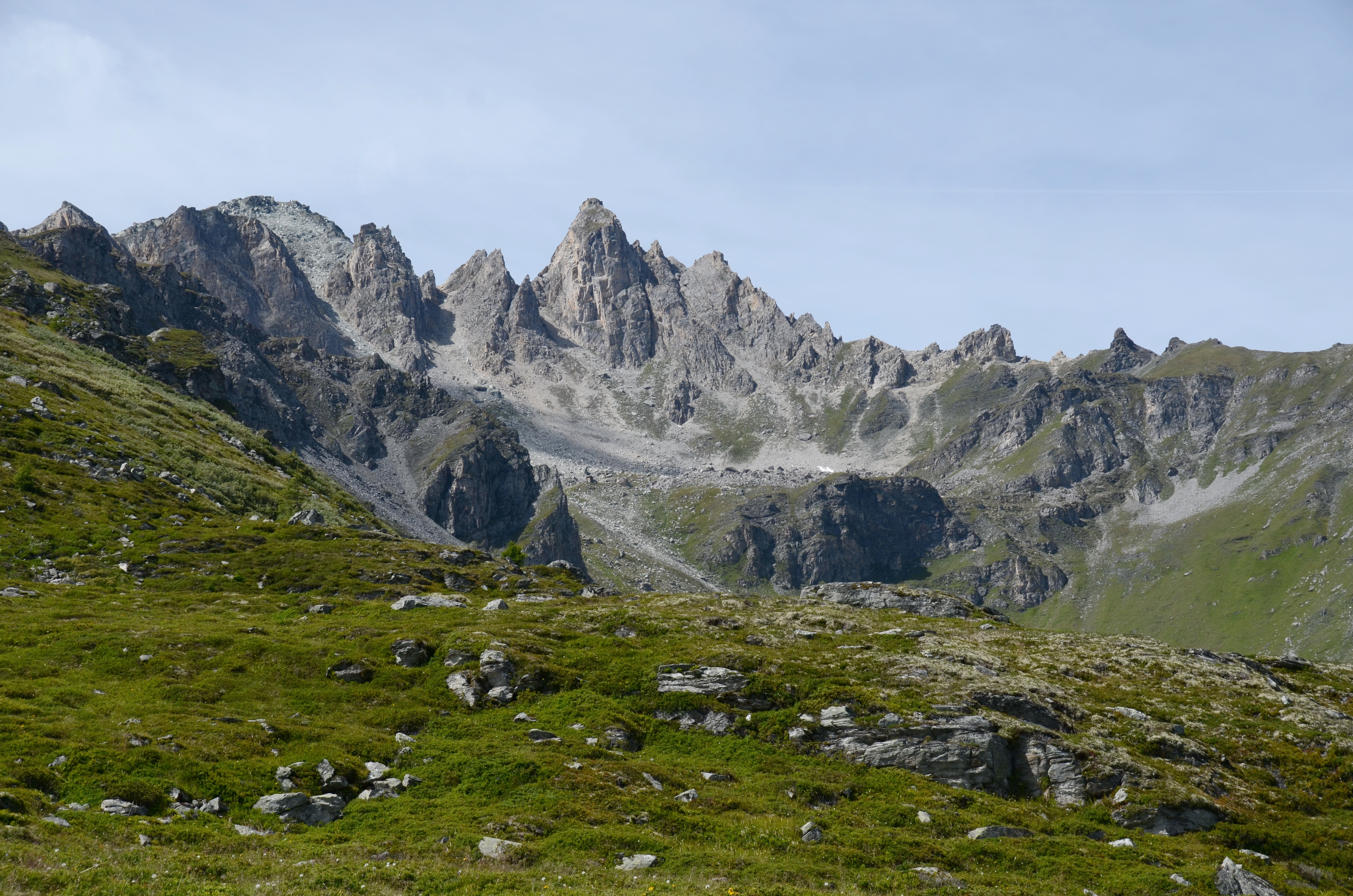
- Pic d'Artsinol

Highest point
- Elevation: 2,998 m (9,836 ft)
- Prominence: 296 m (971 ft)
- Coordinates: 46°6′54.2″N 7°25′37.3″E

Geography
- Location within Switzerland
- Location: Valais, Switzerland
- Parent range: Pennine Alps

Pic d'Artsinol (also Pic d'Arzinol) is a mountain of the Pennine Alps, located west of Evolène in the canton of Valais.
