= Lauenensee =

Lake in canton of Bern, Switzerland

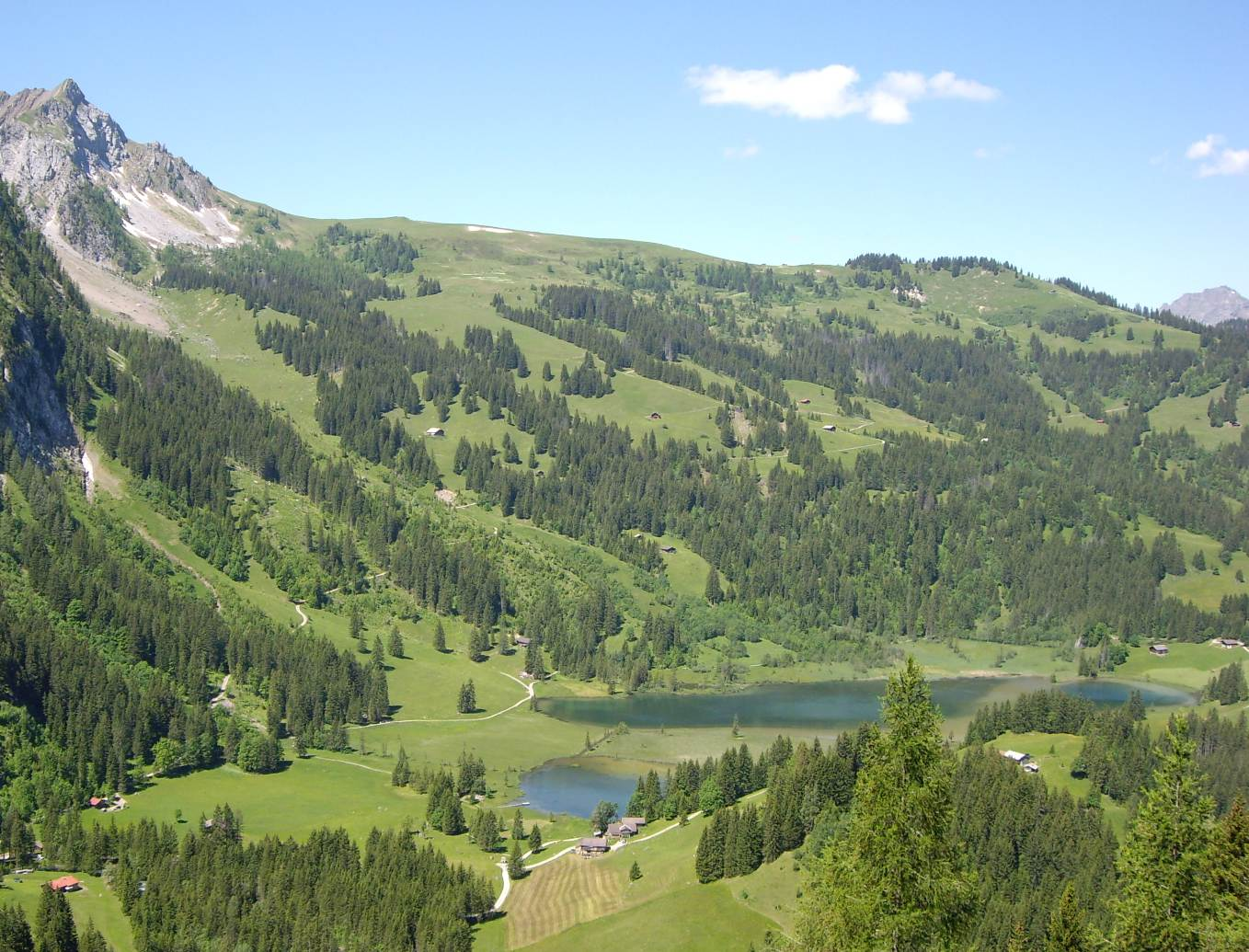

- Location within Canton of Bern Location within Switzerland Location within Alps
- Interactive map of Lauenensee
- Location: Lauenen, Canton of Bern
- Coordinates: 46°23′42″N 7°19′56″E
- Basin countries: Switzerland
- Surface area: 10 ha (25 acres)
- Max. depth: 3.5 m (11 ft)
- Surface elevation: 1,381 m (4,531 ft)

Lauenensee (or Lake Lauenen) are two lakes near Lauenen in the canton of Bern, Switzerland. At an elevation of 1381 m, their surface area is 0.1 km^{2}: the larger lake has a surface of 8.8 ha, the smaller one of 1.3 ha.

The Swiss rock band Span published in 1982 the song "Louenesee" (Lake Lauenen in Berense German) about the lake.

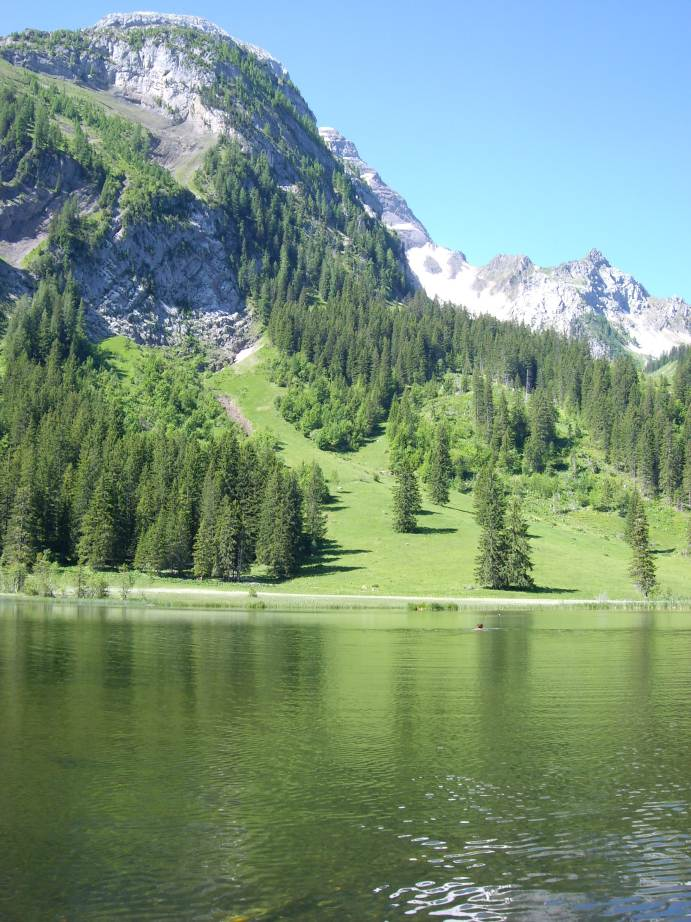

== See also ==
- List of mountain lakes of Switzerland
