= Lauenen =

- Municipality
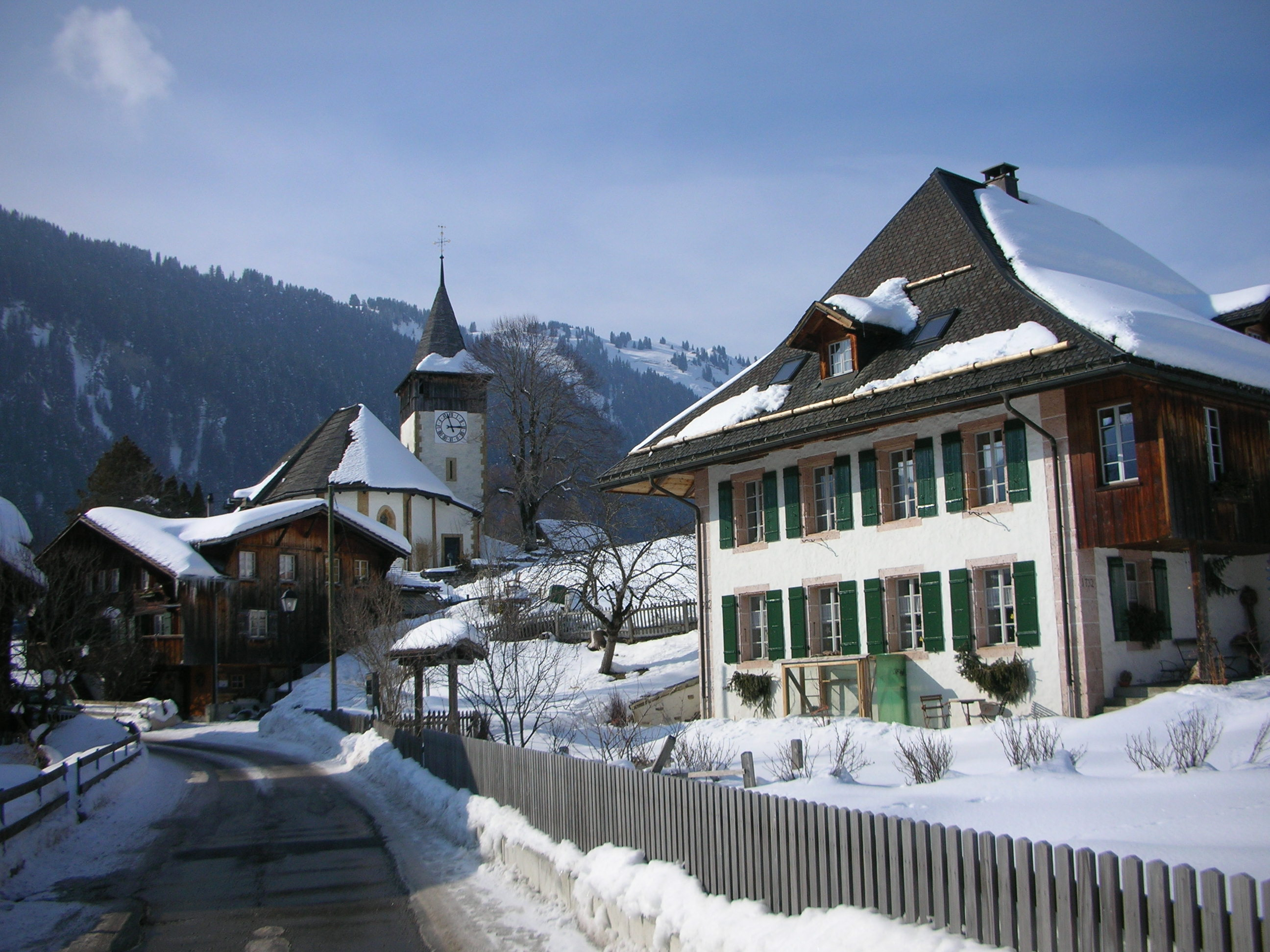
- Lauenen village and church

- Flag Coat of arms
- Location of Lauenen
- Location within Switzerland Location within Canton of Bern
- Coordinates: 46°25′N 7°19′E
- Country: Switzerland
- Canton: Bern
- District: Obersimmental-Saanen

Government
  - Mayor: Ruedi Trachsel

Area
  - Total: 58.7 km^{2} (22.7 sq mi)
- Elevation: 1,252 m (4,108 ft)

Population (Dec 2011)
  - Total: 806
  - Density: 13.7/km^{2} (35.6/sq mi)
- Time zone: UTC+01:00 (CET)
  - Summer (DST): UTC+02:00 (CEST)
- Postal code: 3782
- SFOS number: 842
- ISO 3166 code: CH-BE
- Surrounded by: Saanen, Lenk, Ayent, Savièse, Gsteig bei Gstaad.
- Website: www.lauenen.ch

Lauenen (French: Lauvine, Romansh: Lavina) is a municipality in the Obersimmental-Saanen administrative district in the canton of Bern in Switzerland.

== History ==
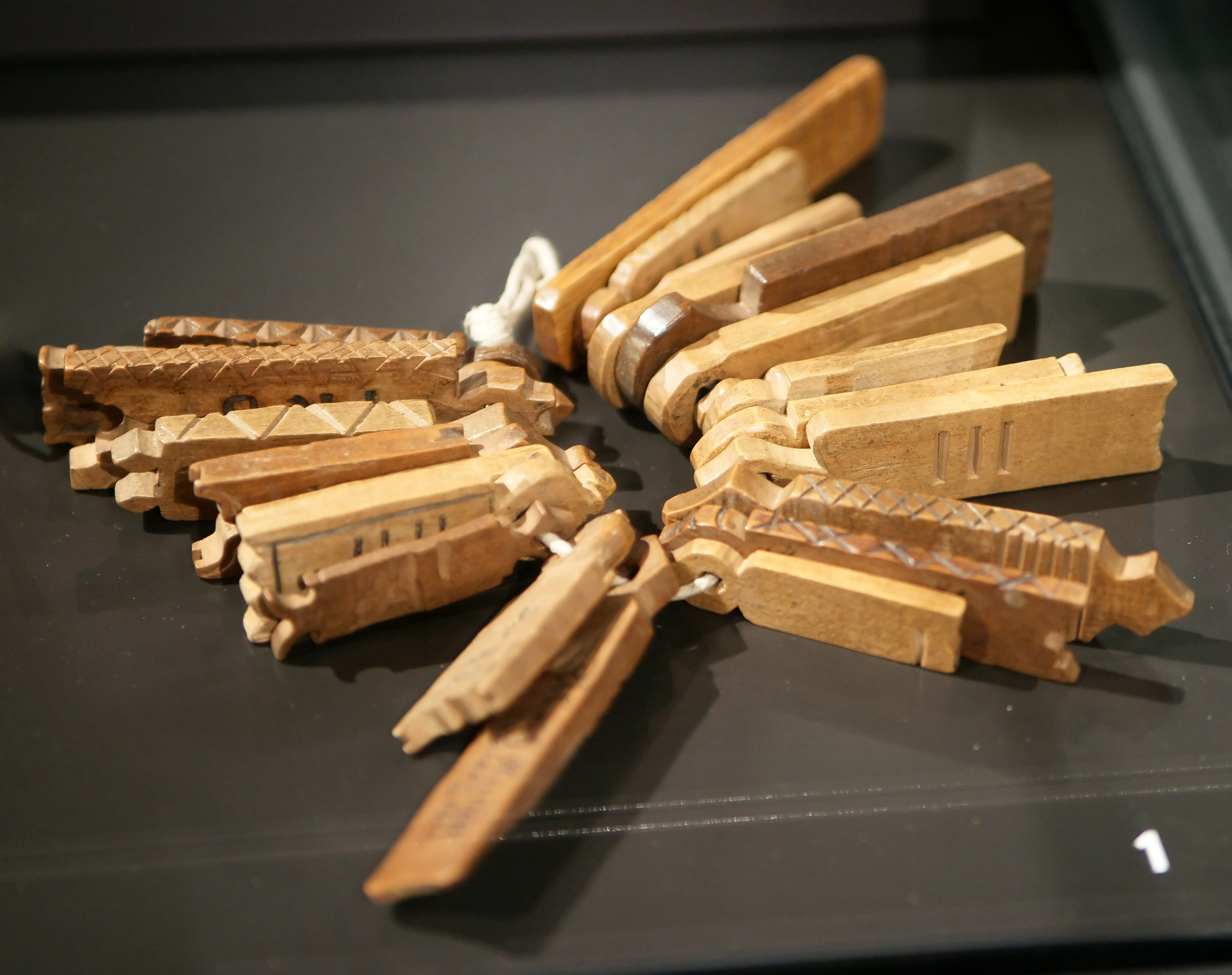
Tally sticks from Alp Blattiberg (Lauenen municipality), 1786/1815. Front: name of entitled person, reverse: notches for cow rights. For this alp, there are 87 cow rights divided among 23 owners.

Lauenen is first mentioned in 1296 as an der Lowinon. Lauenen is known as an area with substantial danger of landslides and avalanches, which is the origin of its name (German Lawine "landslide," from Latin labina "slide").

The oldest trace of a settlement in the area is a single Bronze Age artifact found at Feissenalp. Roman coins were found on the Wildhorn and near the village church. During much of the Middle Ages, Lauenen was part of the municipality and parish of Saanen. After years of negotiations, Lauenen became an independent parish in 1522 and finished building the parish church in 1524. When Bern accepted the new faith of the Protestant Reformation in 1528, Lauenen remained by the old faith. Finally, the Bernese authorities enforced the adoption of the Reformed faith in 1556.

Traditionally the villagers supported themselves by raising crops on the valley floor and raising cattle in seasonal alpine camps. In the 1800s the nearby community of Gstaad became an internationally known spa town. As tourists flocked to Gstaad, Lauenen became a destination as well and grew wealthy. Many of the richly decorated houses in the village were built with profits from the tourist industry. In the 1970s the tourist industry in Lauenen changed as visitors bought vacation chalets and villas.

== Geography ==
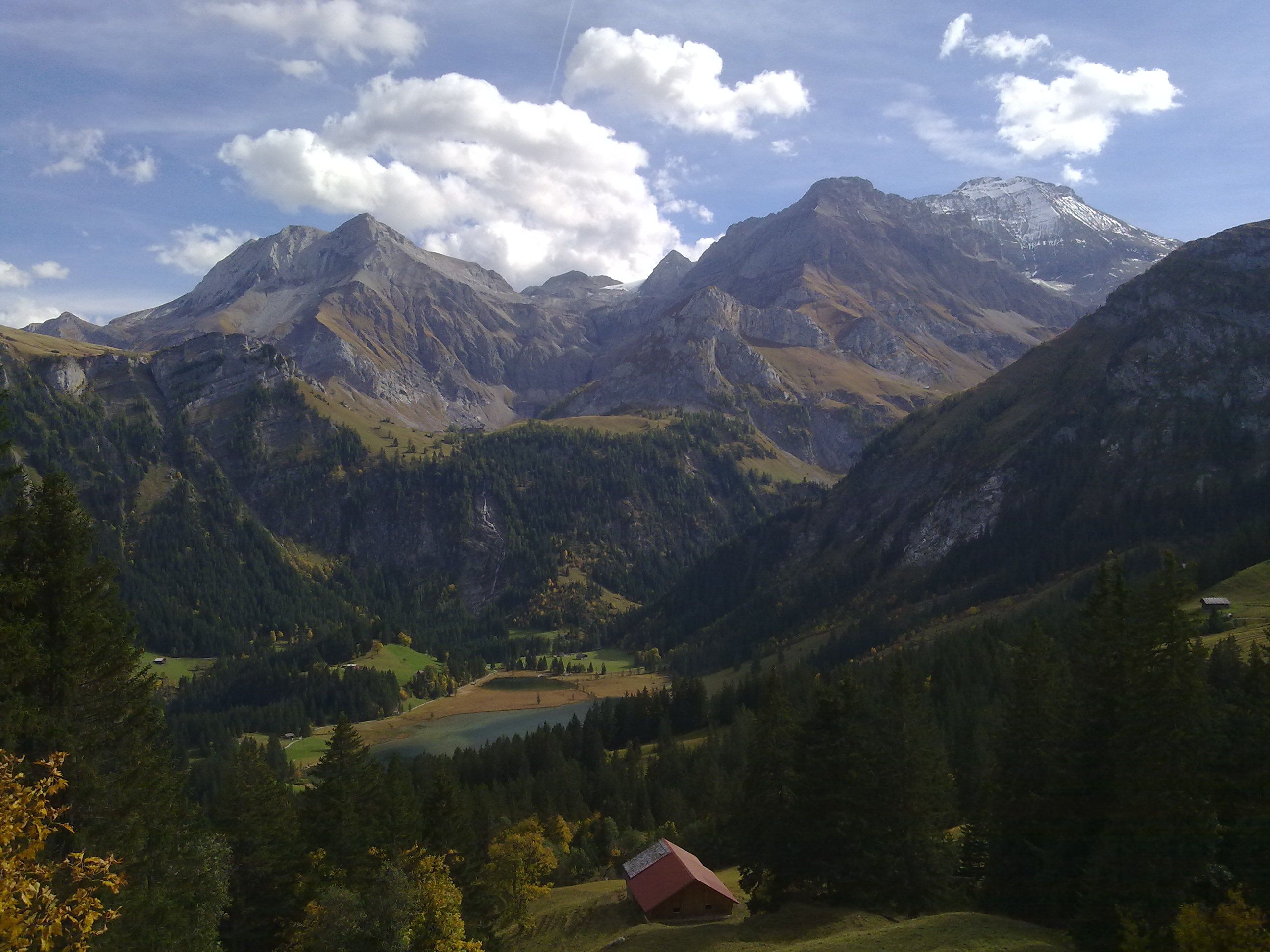
Lauenen Lake surrounded by the Swiss Alps. The Wildhorn is one of the peaks in the background right.

Lauenen has an area of 58.49 km^{2} (22.58 sq mi). As of 2012, a total of 22.38 km^{2} (8.64 mi^{2}) or 38.1% is used for agricultural purposes, while 14.69 km^{2} (5.67 mi^{2}) or 25.0% is forested. The rest of the municipality is 0.76 km^{2} (0.29 mi^{2}) or 1.3% is settled (buildings or roads), 0.61 km^{2} (0.24 mi^{2}) or 1.0% is either rivers or lakes and 20.3 km^{2} (7.8 mi^{2}) or 34.6% is unproductive land.

During the same year, housing and buildings made up 0.7% and transportation infrastructure made up 0.5%. A total of 20.1% of the total land area is heavily forested and 3.7% is covered with orchards or small clusters of trees. Of the agricultural land, 8.8% is pasturage and 29.3% is used for alpine pastures. Of the water in the municipality, 0.3% is in lakes and 0.8% is in rivers and streams. Of the unproductive areas, 5.4% is unproductive vegetation, 24.3% is too rocky for vegetation and 4.9% of the land is covered by glaciers.

Lauenen lies in the Bernese Oberland in the Lauenen Valley. The mountains in the south of the municipality, for instance Wildhorn (3,243 m (10,640 ft)) form the border with the canton of Valais. The municipality has a number of notable glaciers and lakes, including the Tungel Glacier, the Gelten Glacier, and Lake Lauenen. It consists of the village of Lauenen and several scattered small communities.

On 31 December 2009 Amtsbezirk Saanen, the municipality's former district, was dissolved. On the following day, 1 January 2010, it joined the newly created Verwaltungskreis Obersimmental-Saanen.

== Coat of arms ==
The blazon of the municipal coat of arms is Gules a Crane rising Argent beaked and membered Or on a Mount of 3 Coupeaux of the second all dimidiated impaled with Azure a Key Or.

== Demographics ==
Lauenen has a population (as of December 2020) of 828. As of 2011, 11.8% of the population are resident foreign nationals. Over the last year (2010-2011) the population has changed at a rate of 0.5%. Migration accounted for -0.6%, while births and deaths accounted for 1.0%.

Most of the population (as of 2000) speaks German (742 or 93.5%) as their first language, Albanian is the second most common (23 or 2.9%) and French is the third (13 or 1.6%).

As of 2008, the population was 49.6% male and 50.4% female. The population was made up of 351 Swiss men (43.8% of the population) and 47 (5.9%) non-Swiss men. There were 364 Swiss women (45.4%) and 40 (5.0%) non-Swiss women. Of the population in the municipality, 500 or about 63.0% were born in Lauenen and lived there in 2000. There were 170 or 21.4% who were born in the same canton, while 49 or 6.2% were born somewhere else in Switzerland, and 70 or 8.8% were born outside of Switzerland.

As of 2011, children and teenagers (0–19 years old) make up 22.5% of the population, while adults (20–64 years old) make up 59.8% and seniors (over 64 years old) make up 17.7%.

As of 2000, there were 351 people who were single and never married in the municipality. There were 375 married individuals, 45 widows or widowers and 23 individuals who are divorced.

As of 2010, there were 90 households that consist of only one person and 37 households with five or more people. In 2000, a total of 277 apartments (53.2% of the total) were permanently occupied, while 197 apartments (37.8%) were seasonally occupied and 47 apartments (9.0%) were empty. As of 2010, the construction rate of new housing units was 23.7 new units per 1000 residents. The vacancy rate for the municipality, in 2010, was 0.15%. In 2011, single family homes made up 33.9% of the total housing in the municipality.

The historical population is given in the following chart:

== Heritage sites of national significance ==
The former farm house and mill at Dorf 247 is listed as a Swiss heritage site of national significance.

== Politics ==
In the 2011 federal election the most popular party was the Swiss People's Party (SVP) which received 65.8% of the vote. The next three most popular parties were the Conservative Democratic Party (BDP) (9.9%), the Social Democratic Party (SP) (7.9%) and the Federal Democratic Union of Switzerland (EDU) (4.3%). In the federal election, a total of 350 votes were cast, and the voter turnout was 57.1%.

== Economy ==
As of 2011, Lauenen had an unemployment rate of 1.37%. As of 2008, there were a total of 346 people employed in the municipality. Of these, there were 179 people employed in the primary economic sector and about 59 businesses involved in this sector. 69 people were employed in the secondary sector and there were 13 businesses in this sector. 98 people were employed in the tertiary sector, with 18 businesses in this sector. There were 417 residents of the municipality who were employed in some capacity, of which females made up 39.8% of the workforce.

In 2008 there were a total of 231 full-time equivalent jobs. The number of jobs in the primary sector was 97, of which 91 were in agriculture and 6 were in forestry or lumber production. The number of jobs in the secondary sector was 56 of which 15 or (26.8%) were in manufacturing and 42 (75.0%) were in construction. The number of jobs in the tertiary sector was 78. In the tertiary sector; 11 or 14.1% were in wholesale or retail sales or the repair of motor vehicles, 2 or 2.6% were in the movement and storage of goods, 34 or 43.6% were in a hotel or restaurant, 1 was the insurance or financial industry, 2 or 2.6% were technical professionals or scientists, 5 or 6.4% were in education and 11 or 14.1% were in health care.

In 2000, there were 45 workers who commuted into the municipality and 158 workers who commuted away. The municipality is a net exporter of workers, with about 3.5 workers leaving the municipality for every one entering. A total of 259 workers (85.2% of the 304 total workers in the municipality) both lived and worked in Lauenen. Of the working population, 9.6% used public transportation to get to work, and 52.8% used a private car.

In 2011 the average local and cantonal tax rate on a married resident, with two children, of Lauenen making 150,000 CHF was 12.9%, while an unmarried resident's rate was 18.9%. For comparison, the average rate for the entire canton in the same year, was 14.2% and 22.0%, while the nationwide average was 12.3% and 21.1% respectively.

In 2009 there were a total of 301 tax payers in the municipality. Of that total, 71 made over 75,000 CHF per year. There were 7 people who made between 15,000 and 20,000 per year. The greatest number of workers, 84, made between 50,000 and 75,000 CHF per year. The average income of the over 75,000 CHF group in Lauenen was 120,455 CHF, while the average across all of Switzerland was 130,478 CHF.

In 2011 a total of 0.5% of the population received direct financial assistance from the government.

== Religion ==
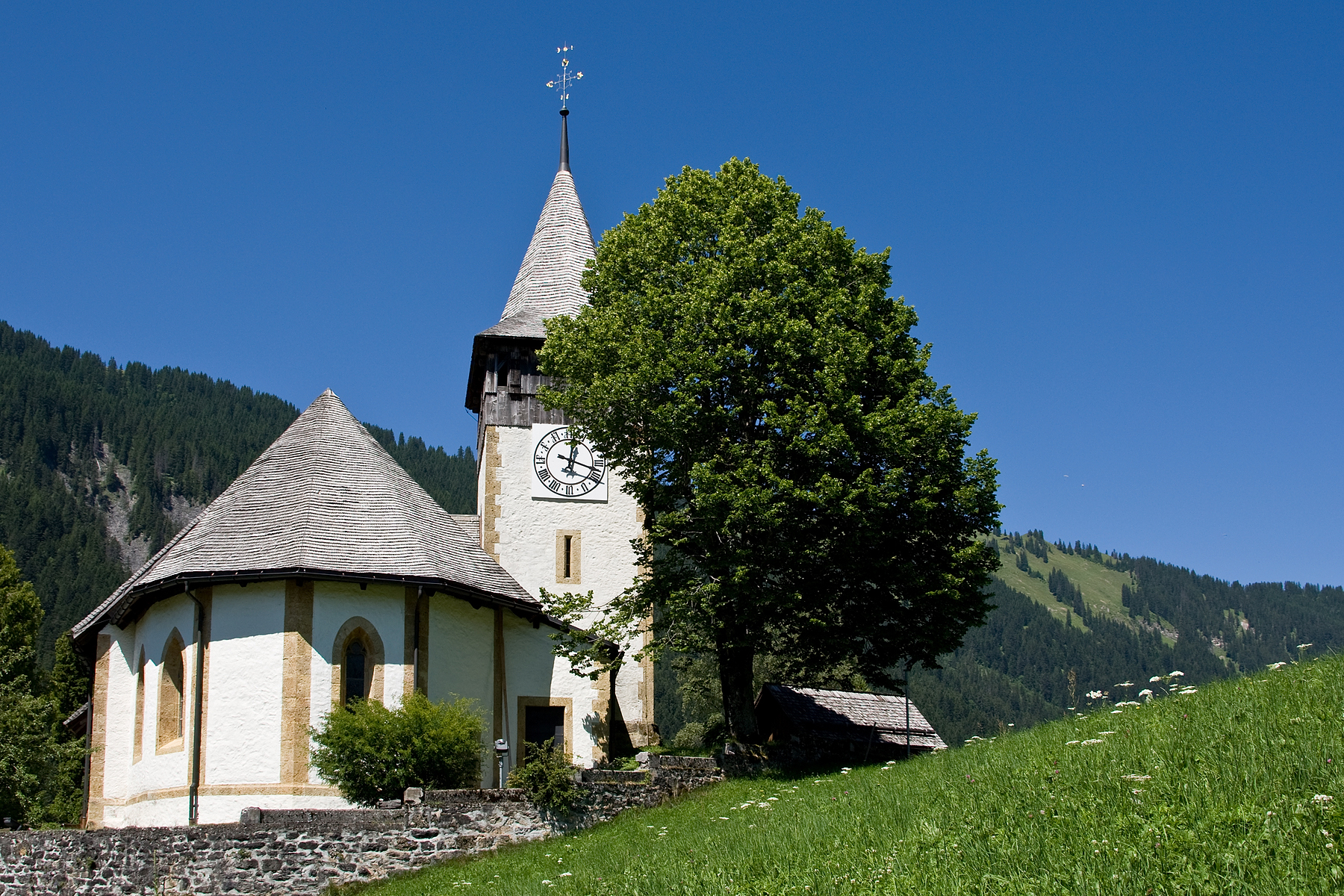
Village church of Lauenen

From the 2000 census, 647 or 81.5% belonged to the Swiss Reformed Church, while 47 or 5.9% were Roman Catholic. Of the rest of the population, there were 49 individuals (or about 6.17% of the population) who belonged to another Christian church. There were 19 (or about 2.39% of the population) who were Muslim. There was 1 person who was Buddhist. 22 (or about 2.77% of the population) belonged to no church, are agnostic or atheist, and 9 individuals (or about 1.13% of the population) did not answer the question.

== Education ==
In Lauenen about 49% of the population have completed non-mandatory upper secondary education, and 11.1% have completed additional higher education (either university or a Fachhochschule). Of the 51 who had completed some form of tertiary schooling listed in the census, 54.9% were Swiss men, 15.7% were Swiss women, 15.7% were non-Swiss men and 13.7% were non-Swiss women.

The Canton of Bern school system provides one year of non-obligatory Kindergarten, followed by six years of Primary school. This is followed by three years of obligatory lower Secondary school where the students are separated according to ability and aptitude. Following the lower Secondary students may attend additional schooling or they may enter an apprenticeship.

During the 2011–12 school year, there were a total of 64 students attending classes in Lauenen. There was one kindergarten class with a total of 11 students in the municipality. The municipality had 2 primary classes and 42 students. Of the primary students, 4.8% were permanent or temporary residents of Switzerland (not citizens) and 2.4% have a different mother language than the classroom language. During the same year, there was one lower secondary class with a total of 11 students.

As of 2000, there were a total of 101 students attending any school in the municipality. Of those, 100 both lived and attended school in the municipality, while one student came from another municipality. During the same year, 18 residents attended schools outside the municipality.

== Famous people ==
- Gottfried Strasser (1854–1912), minister a poet (born in Lauenen)
- Ernst Friedrich Langhans (1829–1880) worked as reformed minister in Lauenen from 1855 to 1858
- Anna von Wattenwyl (1841-1927), religious worker and officer of The Salvation Army
