= Rawil Pass =

Rawilpass
- Interactive map of Rawilpass
- Elevation: 2,429 metres (7,969 ft)
- Traversed by: Trail

Third Approach
- Location: Switzerland
- Range: Alps
- Coordinates: 46°23′0″N 7°26′30″E

The Rawil Pass (el. 2429 m.) (German: Rawilpass) is a high mountain pass across the western Bernese Alps, connecting Lenk in the canton of Bern in Switzerland and Anzère or Crans Montana in the canton of Valais.

The pass lies between the Wildhorn on the west and the Wildstrubel on the east. Lac de Tseuzier is located south of the pass.

== See also ==
- List of mountain passes in Switzerland
