= Lac des Audannes =

Lake in Valais, Switzerland

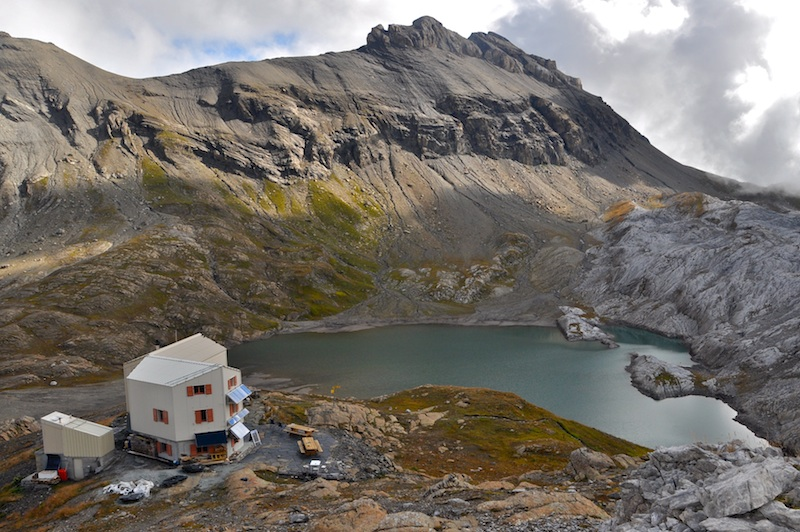

- Location within Canton of Valais Location within Canton of Bern Location within Switzerland Location within Alps
- Interactive map of Lac des Audannes
- Location: Ayent, Valais
- Coordinates: 46°20′39″N 7°23′17″E
- Basin countries: Switzerland
- Surface area: 8.2 ha (20 acres)
- Surface elevation: 2,453 m (8,048 ft)

Lac des Audannes is a lake in the Canton of Valais, Switzerland.

== See also ==
- List of mountain lakes of Switzerland
