= Anzère =

Village in Valais, Switzerland

Coordinates: 46.296°N 7.398°E

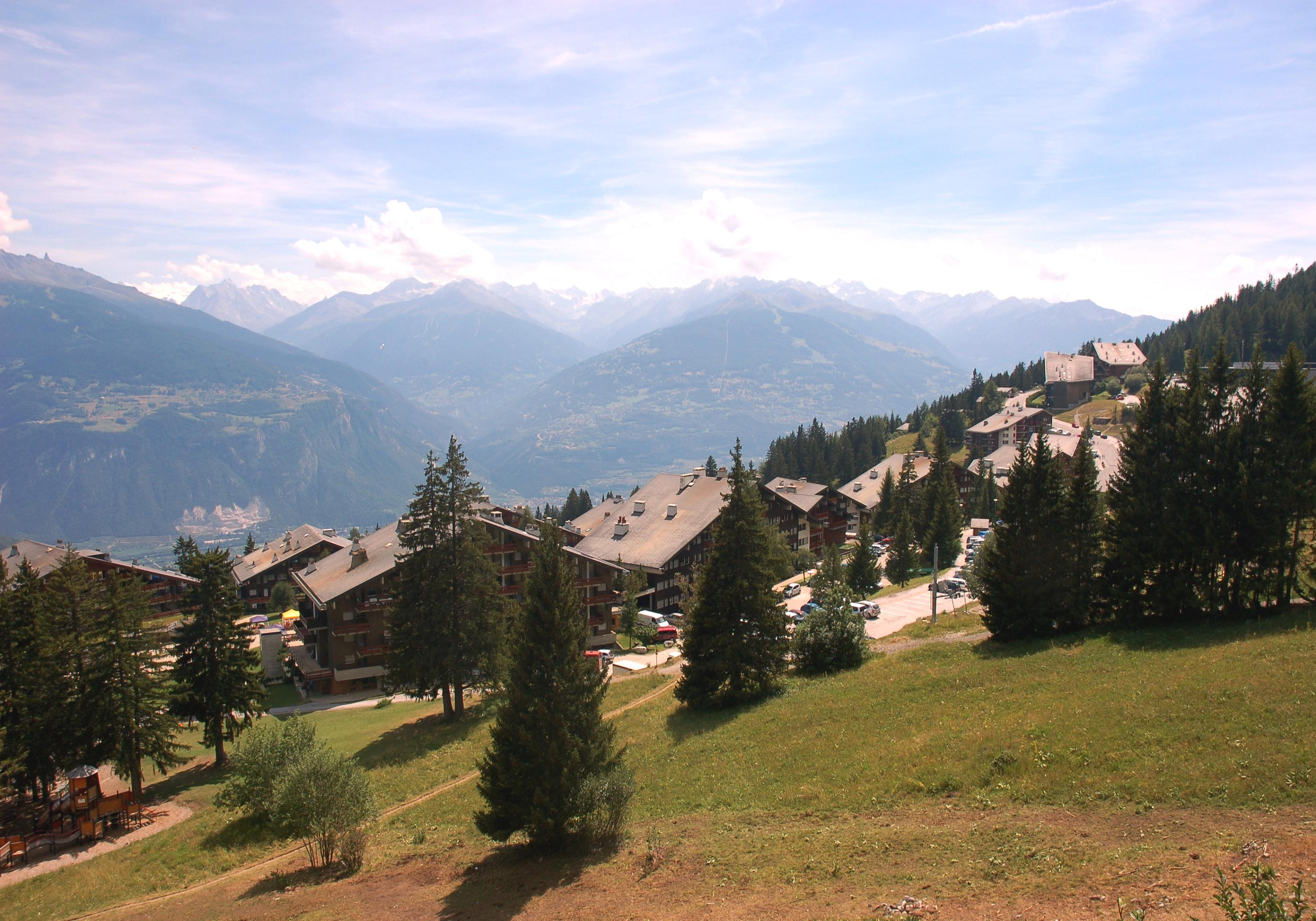
A view of Anzère

Anzère (French pronunciation: [ɑ̃zɛʁ]) is a small village in the canton of Valais, Switzerland, in the municipality of Ayent and close to Sion and Crans. It is a south-facing purpose-built resort in traditional Swiss architectural style.

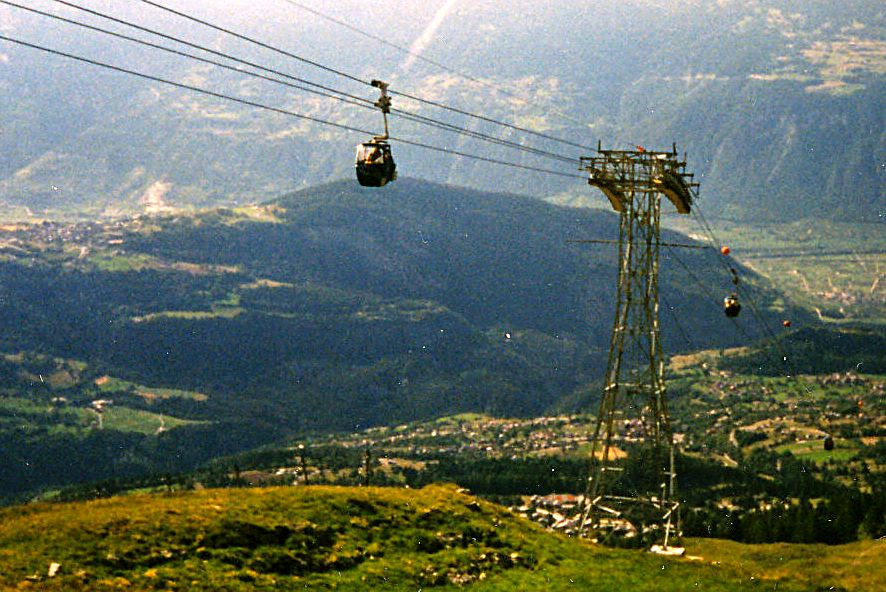
The cablecar seen from the mountain

The Swiss ski resort of Anzère has direct access to 58 km (36 mi) of downhill skiing, with 15 individual pistes, served by 13 ski lifts.

== Toponymy ==
The name Anzère is a respelling of the original local name Antsère, which itself is a corruption of the local patois "intière" (whole), referring to a pasture that had not yet been grazed on before being reaped.

== Skiing ==
The ski slopes in Anzère cover about 58 kilometers (the longest run being Les Rousses at over 5 km long) with 2 cablecars, 3 chair lifts, and 4 drag lifts. There are several self-service restaurants on the mountain, and the entire area is known as Télé-Anzère.

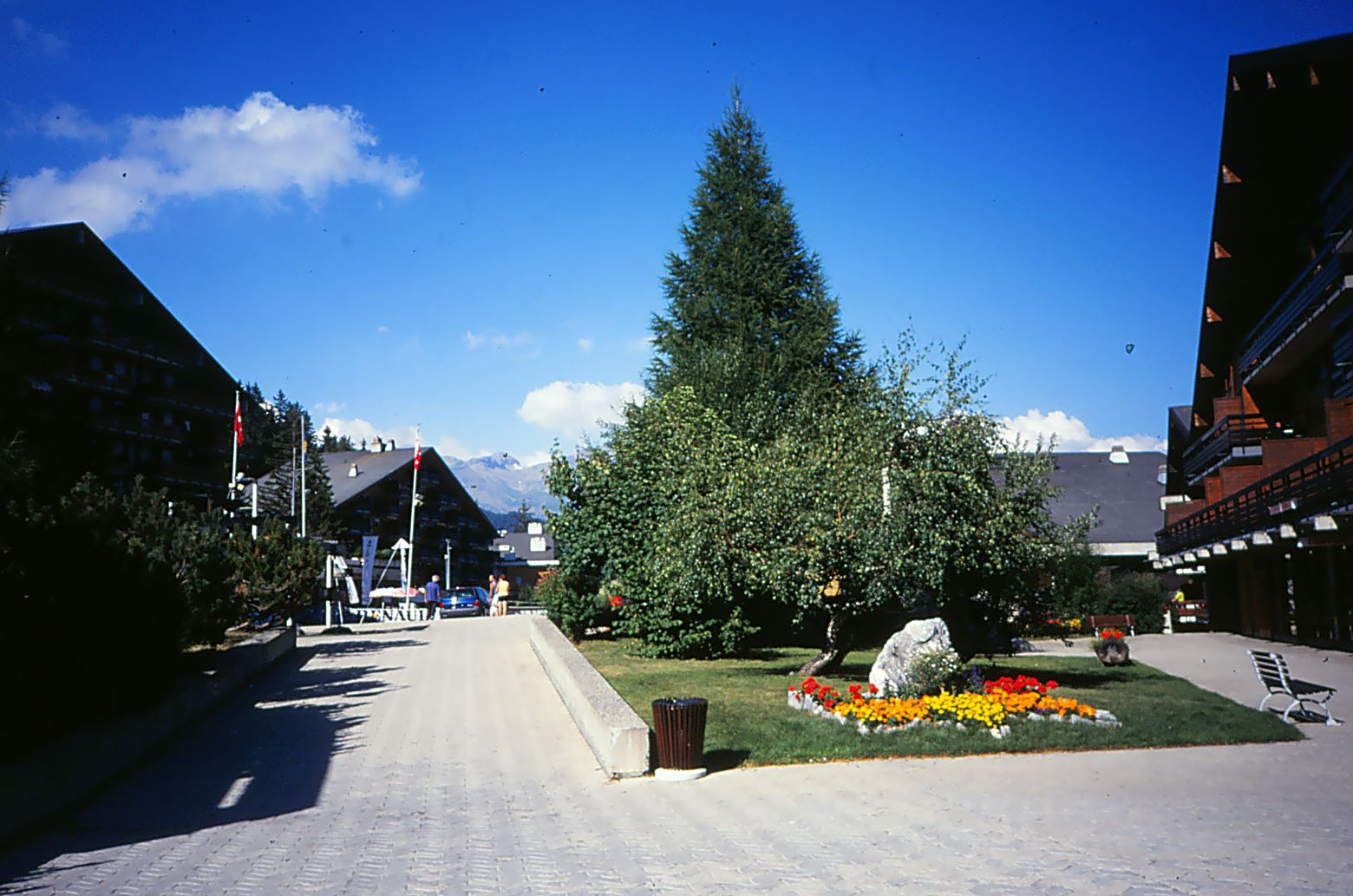
Town Centre

== Town centre ==
Facilities in and around Anzère's Place du Village include both indoor and outdoor swimming pools, a supermarket, multiple hotels, bars and nightclubs, as well as many restaurants and clothes shops. The Place du Village is a pedestrian area right in the heart of the village, containing most of Anzère's cafes and restaurants. There is also an internet cafe, a creperie and a children's play area.
