= Etang Grenon =

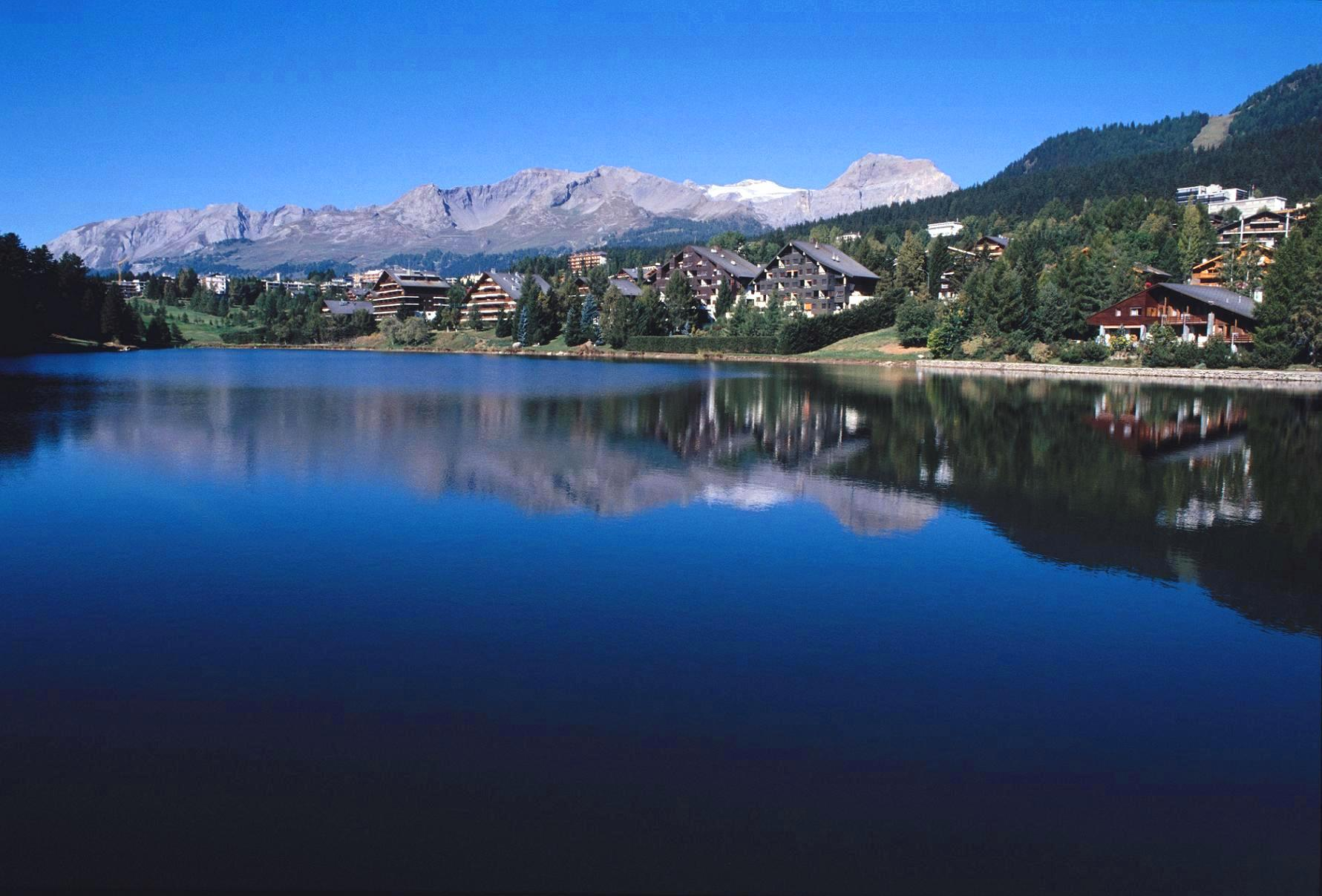

- Location within Canton of Valais Location within Switzerland Location within Alps
- Interactive map of Etang Grenon
- Location: Crans-Montana, Valais
- Coordinates: 46°18′36″N 7°28′33″E
- Type: artificial lake
- Basin countries: Switzerland
- Surface area: 3.5 ha (8.6 acres)
- Surface elevation: 1,497 m (4,911 ft)

Etang Grenon or Lac Grenon is a lake at Montana in the canton of Valais, Switzerland. Located at an elevation of 1497 m, its surface area is 3.5 ha.
