= Chelin, Switzerland =

Chelin
- Village
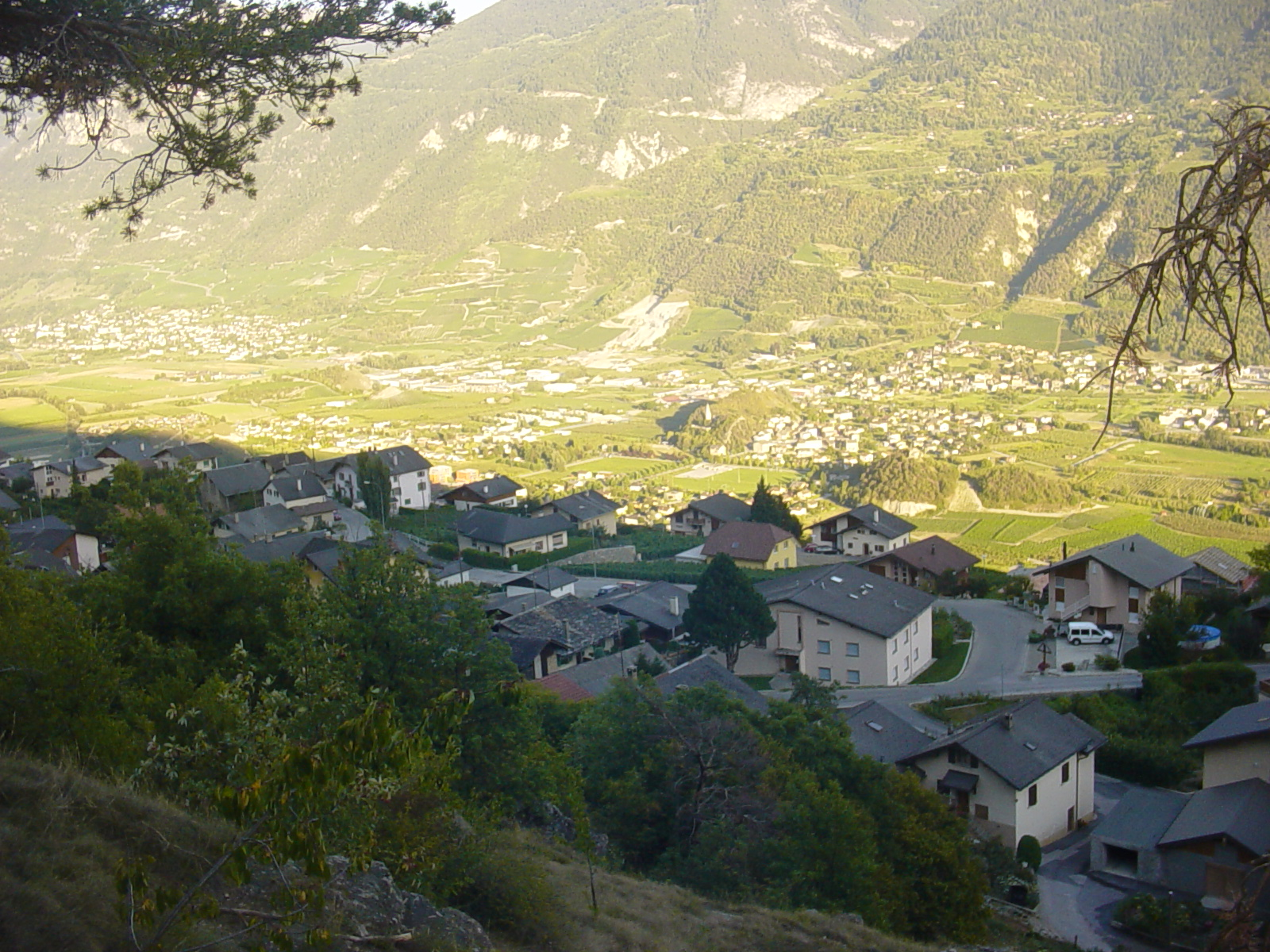
- Chelin village as seen from the Véreillaz forest.

- Location of Chelin in Switzerland
- Coordinates: 46°16′2″N 7°26′45″E
- Country: Switzerland
- Canton: Valais
- District: Sierre
- Municipality: Lens
- Elevation: 2,481 ft (756 m)

Population (2022)
  - Total: 438
- Demonym: Chelinnards
- Time zone: UTC+1 (CET)
  - Summer (DST): UTC+2 (CEST)
- Website: lens.ch

Chelin (pronounce /xәlíṅ/ in patois) is a village of the municipality of Lens in the district of Sierre in Switzerland.

== Geography ==
Chelin is located on the slope of the hill Châtelard, on the right side of the Rhone Valley, in the canton of Valais. The village is situated at around 8 km of Sion, at 8.5 km of Sierre and at 10.5 km of Crans-Montana.

== History ==
The first evidence of a permanent settlement date back to the Bronze Age, as attested by the discovery in 1894 of a Celtic cemetery which has unfortunately been destroyed since then. Archaeologists found varied objects of the daily life that haven't been sold, but offered to the Swiss National Museum, the Natural History Museum of Geneva and the Natural History Museum of Sion. They found for example, two torcs, a Gallic bracelet, a razor, three vases and some belt ornaments.

In 1223, a list of royalties mention a fertile field cultivated in kitchen garden or in orchard. Some years after, vineyards are mentioned for the first time. Thereafter, texts reveal fewer fields and meadows, probably because it yielded less money than the vines.

In June 1934, after an upsurge of tuberculosis cases in Valais, we built a preventorium to provide infected children air cures and allow them to rest.

Chelin has in all likelihood been inhabited continuously since the Bronze Age, so we do not find a lot of very old houses as modernized over time.

In the past, this village was visited by far for the practice of hunting grey partridge so abundant, but it left the Valais in the 1960s due to the urbanization of the canton.
