= Lac de Chermignon =

- Location within Canton of Valais Location within Switzerland Location within Alps
- Interactive map of Lac de Chermignon
- Location: Lens, Valais
- Coordinates: 46.3125°N 7.4675°E
- Type: reservoir
- Basin countries: Switzerland
- Surface area: 2.1 ha (5.2 acres)
- Water volume: 130,000 m^{3} (110 acre⋅ft); 300,000 m^{3} (240 acre⋅ft) (total capacity)
- Surface elevation: 1,580 m (5,180 ft)

Lac de Chermignon is a reservoir in the municipality of Lens, in the canton of Valais, Switzerland. The lake has a surface area of 2.1 hectares (5.2 acres) and a volume of 130,000 cubic metres (110 acre⋅ft).
