= Etang de la Moubra =

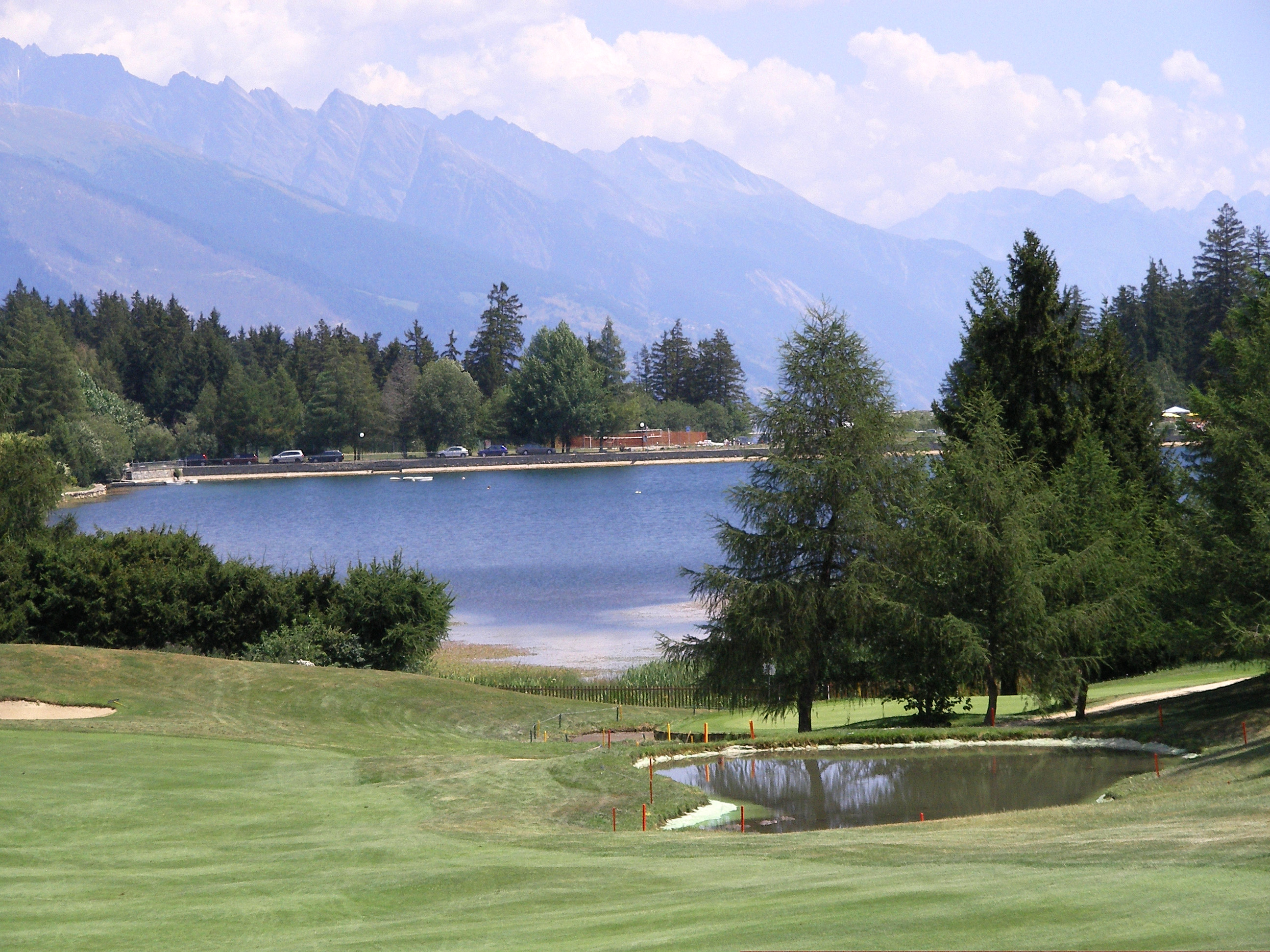

- Location within Canton of Valais Location within Switzerland Location within Alps
- Interactive map of Etang de la Moubra
- Location: Crans-Montana, Valais
- Coordinates: 46.3043°N 7.4781°E
- Type: artificial lake
- Basin countries: Switzerland
- Surface area: 5 ha (12 acres)
- Surface elevation: 1,424 m (4,672 ft)

Etang de la Moubra or Lac de la Moubra is a lake at Montana in the canton of Valais, Switzerland. Located at an elevation of 1424 m, its surface area is 5 ha.

== See also ==
- List of mountain lakes of Switzerland
