= Randogne =

- Former municipality
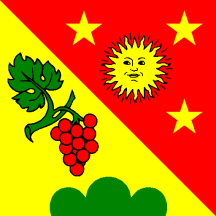
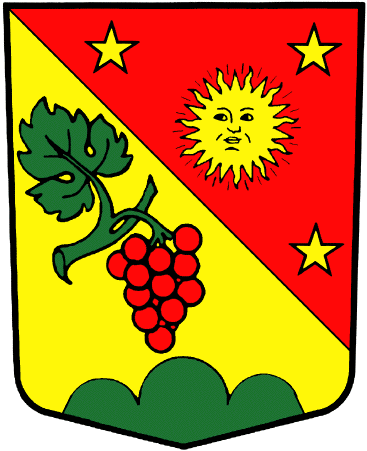
- Flag Coat of arms
- Location of Randogne
- Location within Switzerland Location within Canton of Valais
- Coordinates: 46°19′N 7°31′E
- Country: Switzerland
- Canton: Valais
- District: Sierre

Government
  - Mayor: Paul-Albert Clivaz

Area
  - Total: 16.9 km^{2} (6.5 sq mi)
- Elevation: 1,220 m (4,000 ft)
- Highest elevation (Mont Bonvin): 2,995 m (9,826 ft)
- Lowest elevation: 540 m (1,770 ft)

Population (December 2002)
  - Total: 3,138
  - Density: 186/km^{2} (481/sq mi)
- Time zone: UTC+01:00 (CET)
  - Summer (DST): UTC+02:00 (CEST)
- Postal code: 3975
- SFOS number: 6244
- ISO 3166 code: CH-VS
- Surrounded by: Icogne, Lenk im Simmental (BE), Lens, Mollens, Montana, Sierre, Venthône
- Website: www.commune-cransmontana.ch

Randogne (French pronunciation: [ʁɑ̃dɔɲ]) is a former municipality in the district of Sierre in the canton of Valais in Switzerland. On 1 January 2017 the former municipalities of Chermignon, Mollens, Montana and Randogne merged to form the new municipality of Crans-Montana.

== History ==
Randogne is first mentioned in 1224 as Randonni.

== Geography ==
Aerial view (1955)

Randogne had an area, as of 2009, of 16.9 square kilometers (6.5 mi^{2}). Of this area, 4.43 km^{2} (1.71 mi^{2}) or 26.2% is used for agricultural purposes, while 5.24 km^{2} (2.02 mi^{2}) or 31.0% is forested. Of the rest of the land, 2.05 km^{2} (0.79 mi^{2}) or 12.1% is settled (buildings or roads), 0.04 km^{2} (9.9 acres) or 0.2% is either rivers or lakes and 5.07 km^{2} (1.96 mi^{2}) or 30.0% is unproductive land.

Of the built up area, housing and buildings made up 7.5% and transportation infrastructure made up 3.3%. Out of the forested land, 28.0% of the total land area is heavily forested and 3.0% is covered with orchards or small clusters of trees. Of the agricultural land, 0.1% is used for growing crops and 5.4% is pastures, while 5.7% is used for orchards or vine crops and 15.1% is used for alpine pastures. All the water in the municipality is flowing water. Of the unproductive areas, 6.6% is unproductive vegetation and 23.5% is too rocky for vegetation.

The former municipality is located in the Sierre district, on the northern slope of the Rhone valley. The municipality goes from the Rhone valley at an elevation of 540 m (1,770 ft) to Mont Bonvin at 2,995 m (9,826 ft). It consists of the village of Randogne (which was rebuilt in stone after the destructive fire of 1898), the village of Loc, portions of the village of Darnona and Bluche, as well as the majority of the resort of Montana-Vermala and Montana-Station.

== Coat of arms ==
The blazon of the municipal coat of arms is Per bend Gules a Sun in Splendour Or between three Mullets of Five of the same and Or a Grape Gules slipped Vert in base Coupeaux of the last.

== Demographics ==
Randogne had a population (as of 2015) of 4,479. As of 2008, 59.1% of the population are resident foreign nationals (It is mainly due to the number of International students enrolled in the hospitality school in the village). Over the last 10 years (2000–2010 ) the population has changed at a rate of 36.2%. It has changed at a rate of 30.1% due to migration and at a rate of -0.5% due to births and deaths.

Most of the population (as of 2000) speaks French (1,767 or 59.6%) as their first language, German is the second most common (238 or 8.0%) and English is the third (200 or 6.7%). There are 100 people who speak Italian and 1 person who speaks Romansh.

As of 2008, the population was 49.6% male and 50.4% female. The population was made up of 827 Swiss men (20.0% of the population) and 1,230 (29.7%) non-Swiss men. There were 858 Swiss women (20.7%) and 1,230 (29.7%) non-Swiss women. Of the population in the municipality, 597 or about 20.1% were born in Randogne and lived there in 2000. There were 451 or 15.2% who were born in the same canton, while 366 or 12.4% were born somewhere else in Switzerland, and 1,463 or 49.4% were born outside of Switzerland.

As of 2000, children and teenagers (0–19 years old) make up 20.3% of the population, while adults (20–64 years old) make up 67% and seniors (over 64 years old) make up 12.7%.

As of 2000, there were 1,491 people who were single and never married in the municipality. There were 1,184 married individuals, 141 widows or widowers and 147 individuals who are divorced.

As of 2000, there were 1,014 private households in the municipality, and an average of 2.1 persons per household. There were 393 households that consist of only one person and 39 households with five or more people. In 2000, a total of 941 apartments (27.7% of the total) were permanently occupied, while 2,406 apartments (70.7%) were seasonally occupied and 55 apartments (1.6%) were empty. As of 2009, the construction rate of new housing units was 22.7 new units per 1000 residents. The vacancy rate for the municipality, in 2010, was 0.58%.

The historical population is given in the following chart:

== Politics ==
In the 2007 federal election the most popular party was the CVP which received 46.24% of the vote. The next three most popular parties were the SVP (17.76%), the FDP (14.35%) and the SP (13.58%). In the federal election, a total of 841 votes were cast, and the voter turnout was 55.1%.

In the 2009 Conseil d'État/Staatsrat election a total of 661 votes were cast, of which 40 or about 6.1% were invalid. The voter participation was 44.0%, which is much less than the cantonal average of 54.67%. In the 2007 Swiss Council of States election a total of 829 votes were cast, of which 53 or about 6.4% were invalid. The voter participation was 55.6%, which is similar to the cantonal average of 59.88%.

== Economy ==
As of 2010, Randogne had an unemployment rate of 4.7%. As of 2008, there were 30 people employed in the primary economic sector and about 15 businesses involved in this sector. 122 people were employed in the secondary sector and there were 18 businesses in this sector. 1,097 people were employed in the tertiary sector, with 88 businesses in this sector. There were 1,320 residents of the municipality who were employed in some capacity, of which females made up 45.8% of the workforce.

In 2008 the total number of full-time equivalent jobs was 1,085. The number of jobs in the primary sector was 17, all of which were in agriculture. The number of jobs in the secondary sector was 115 of which 36 or (31.3%) were in manufacturing and 79 (68.7%) were in construction. The number of jobs in the tertiary sector was 953. In the tertiary sector; 99 or 10.4% were in wholesale or retail sales or the repair of motor vehicles, 114 or 12.0% were in the movement and storage of goods, 103 or 10.8% were in a hotel or restaurant, 8 or 0.8% were the insurance or financial industry, 17 or 1.8% were technical professionals or scientists, 176 or 18.5% were in education and 343 or 36.0% were in health care.

In 2000, there were 461 workers who commuted into the municipality and 810 workers who commuted away. The municipality is a net exporter of workers, with about 1.8 workers leaving the municipality for every one entering. Of the working population, 8.6% used public transportation to get to work, and 58.1% used a private car.

== Religion ==
From the 2000 census, 1,659 or 56.0% were Roman Catholic, while 278 or 9.4% belonged to the Swiss Reformed Church. Of the rest of the population, there were 196 members of an Orthodox church (or about 6.61% of the population), and there were 51 individuals (or about 1.72% of the population) who belonged to another Christian church. There were 6 individuals (or about 0.20% of the population) who were Jewish, and 43 (or about 1.45% of the population) who were Islamic. There were 13 individuals who were Buddhist, 32 individuals who were Hindu and 8 individuals who belonged to another church. 307 (or about 10.36% of the population) belonged to no church, are agnostic or atheist, and 389 individuals (or about 13.13% of the population) did not answer the question.

== Education ==
In Randogne about 911 or (30.7%) of the population have completed non-mandatory upper secondary education, and 445 or (15.0%) have completed additional higher education (either university or a Fachhochschule). Of the 445 who completed tertiary schooling, 39.3% were Swiss men, 21.6% were Swiss women, 20.4% were non-Swiss men and 18.7% were non-Swiss women.

As of 2000, there were 129 students in Randogne who came from another municipality, while 241 residents attended schools outside the municipality.

== Notable people ==
- Elizabeth von Arnim (1866–1941), Australian-born British novelist, lived in Randogne 1910–1930
