= Fairy Rock (Crans Montana, Valais) =

Rock castle ruins in Switzerland

Rock Castle Fairy Rock
- Crans-Montana, Valais, Switzerland
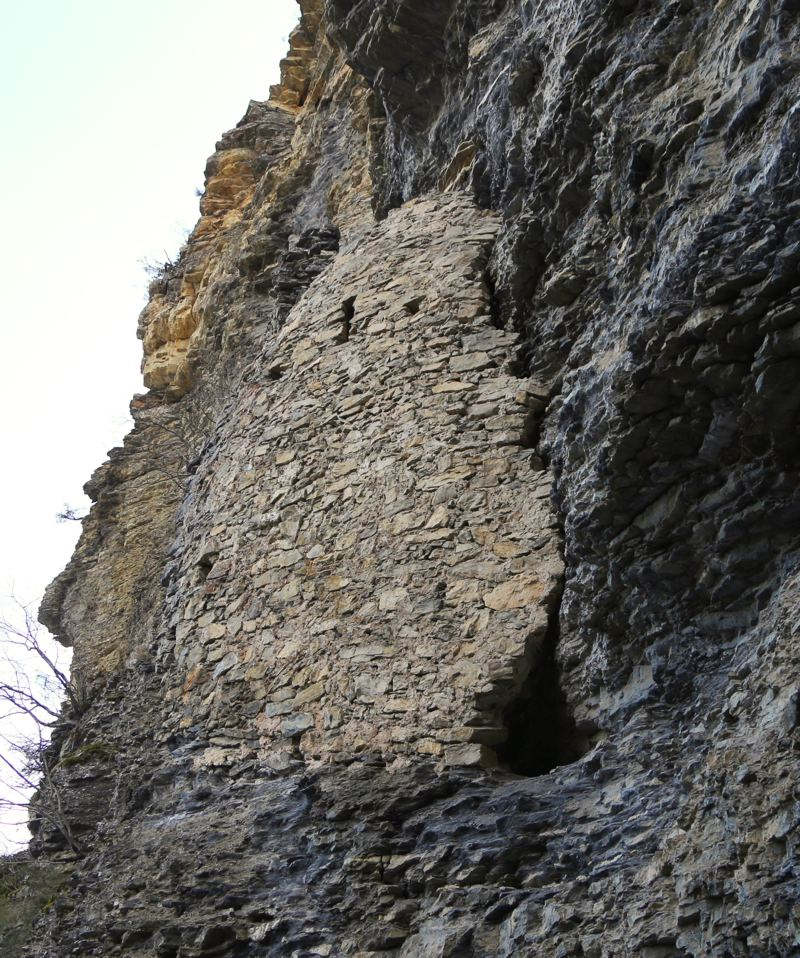
- Lower shelter of the castle seen from below

Site information
- Type: Rock castle, cave castle
- Code: CH
- Condition: Ruins

Location
- Coordinates: 46°19′33″N 7°31′13″E

Site history
- Built: Late 12th century
- Materials: Stone masonry

The ruins of the rock castle called Fairy Rock (French: Rocher des Fées) are located in the municipality of Crans-Montana, Valais, Switzerland, between Mollens and Aminona, more precisely in a rock face at the hamlet Les Echerts. The ruins are rather well preserved, and can be easily admired from nearby. Due to its location in the rock, however, accessing the inside is difficult. The rock castle was built at the end of the 12th century, and was probably used as a refuge during the wars and raids of that period.

This rock castle is registered in the Swiss inventory of cultural property under the name Roches des Fées. It should not be confused with the Cave of the Fairies (French: Grotte aux Fées) near Saint-Maurice, in lower Valais.

== Rock castles in Valais ==
Rock castles, also called cave castles, or troglodyte shelters, can be found all over Switzerland, but they are quite common in central Valais. The Fairy Rock castle is among the best-preserved ones and can be easily inspected in detail. There is a second rock castle in the municipality of Crans-Montana, but it lies far in the rock face above Les Cingles, and is therefore hardly visible and practically inaccessible. There are other rock castles in the nearby region, also referred to as Grotte aux Fées or just Grotte, for example, in the municipalities of Arbaz, Grône, Nax, and Leukerbad. All were built between the 12th and 15th centuries, which also coincides with the warlike periods in the Middle Ages in Valais. These shelters are remote and hardly accessible. During the raids, the few initiated could find safe refuge there.

== Site and location ==
The ruins of the rock castle are located on the territory of the municipality of Crans-Montana, near the asphalted road between Mollens and Aminona, in the lower part of the rock wall above the hamlet Les Echerts. When going up this road, there is first a turn-off to the right to reach this hamlet, and shortly after that, on the left, there is a parking lot with a sign The Fairy Rock. From this parking lot, a short path leads through the forest to the rock castle. However, one can only see it from a distance of 5-20 m, because it cannot be accessed without a long ladder or climbing equipment. In winter the visibility of the rock castle is better, as the view is not obscured by the foliage of trees. The coordinates of the castle are 46°19′33″N 7°31′13″E and its elevation is about 1265 m above the sea level.

The castle consists of two interconnected shelters, which lie above each other. Each of these shelters is about 5 m high, and 4 m wide. Their shape is reminiscent of two egg-shaped shells, which were built into crevices of the rock. Apart from the northern part of the upper shelter, the masonry is well preserved. The masonry is made of slate blocks cut nearby and connected with lime. The building adapts optically well to the rock, such that it is hardly visible even from nearby.

The shelters were illuminated with narrow hatches, which probably also served as embrasures. Inside the shelters, beam casings can be seen, which in former times were used to anchor a wooden scaffolding. This wooden scaffolding probably supported several wooden floors dividing the shelters.

The rock castle was accessible through an entrance to the lower shelter, which is located about 3 m in the rock above the ground. Presumably a ladder was used, which could be removed in case of emergency. The upper shelter could be reached through an opening located above the uppermost wooden floor of the lower shelter.

== History ==
The rock castle was built around 1180-1200, thus towards the end of the 12th century. The dating was achieved by means of dendrochronology, which indicates the year 1179, when the pine tree used for a beam in the lower shelter was felled.

The rock castle was hardly visible and could only be reached with a long ladder. The shelter was also difficult to find because there was no road leading nearby. Today's asphalted road was only built around 1965. In the past, the path across the hamlet led further East of the rock castle, much like today's main hiking trail. One can thus conclude that the rock castle had only a protective function. Inside, the space was limited to a few dozen square meters, and it was impossible to store large quantities of water and food. Therefore, only a few initiates could hope to find safe refuge there for a relatively short period of time.

Historians suspect that these shelters were used during the raids from intruders from Bern and Savoy in Valais. Safe shelters became important first during the wars of emancipation against the emperors of the house of Zähringen in the north (late 10th to early 11th century), then during the battles against the Dukes of Savoy in the West (13th century), and during the Raron affair (14th and 15th century). It is conceivable that these shelters were also used more recently, possibly in 1798 and 1799, when Napoleon's troops stormed the region.

== Legends ==
There are several legends about this rock castle. The best-known one tells that fairies with sheep feet should have lived in this rock castle. These fairies should have secretly used an underground tunnel that connects the castle with the mill in the village of Mollens. Once in the mill, they did not only pick flour, but also fruit, liquor, and pets.

Of course, the tunnel only exists in this legend, but it was probably stimulated by a cavity that is located in the lower shelter. This legend was very practical for the journeyman. When the miller scolded him that something had again disappeared from the mill, he would blame the fairies.

== See also ==
- List of castles in Switzerland
- History of Valais
