= Mollens, Valais =

Mollens
- Former municipality
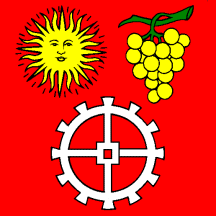
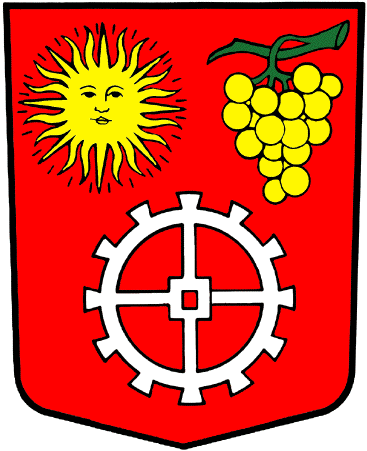
- Flag Coat of arms
- Location of Mollens
- Location within Switzerland Location within Canton of Valais
- Coordinates: 46°19′N 7°31′E
- Country: Switzerland
- Canton: Valais
- District: Sierre

Government
  - Mayor: Stéphane Pont

Area
  - Total: 32.5 km^{2} (12.5 sq mi)
- Elevation: 1,070 m (3,510 ft)
- Highest elevation (Schneehorn): 3,177 m (10,423 ft)

Population (December 2002)
  - Total: 269
  - Density: 8.28/km^{2} (21.4/sq mi)
- Time zone: UTC+01:00 (CET)
  - Summer (DST): UTC+02:00 (CEST)
- Postal code: 3974
- SFOS number: 6242
- ISO 3166 code: CH-VS
- Surrounded by: Inden, Lenk im Simmental (BE), Leukerbad, Miège, Randogne, Salgesch, Varen, Venthône
- Website: www.commune-cransmontana.ch

Mollens (French pronunciation: [mɔlɑ̃s]) is a former municipality in the district of Sierre in the canton of Valais in Switzerland. On 1 January 2017 the former municipalities of Mollens, Chermignon, Montana and Randogne merged into the new municipality of Crans-Montana.

== History ==
Mollens is first mentioned about 1250 as Molaen. In 1286 it was mentioned as Moleing. The municipality was formerly known by its German name Molei, however, that name is no longer used.

== Geography ==
Mollens had an area, as of 2009, of 32.5 square kilometers (12.5 mi^{2}). Of this area, 8.58 km^{2} (3.31 mi^{2}) or 26.4% is used for agricultural purposes, while 10.44 km^{2} (4.03 mi^{2}) or 32.1% is forested. Of the rest of the land, 1 km^{2} (0.39 mi^{2}) or 3.1% is settled (buildings or roads), 0.25 km^{2} (0.097 mi^{2}) or 0.8% is either rivers or lakes and 12.24 km^{2} (4.73 mi^{2}) or 37.6% is unproductive land.

Of the built up area, housing and buildings made up 1.7% and transportation infrastructure made up 1.3%. Out of the forested land, 28.6% of the total land area is heavily forested and 3.5% is covered with orchards or small clusters of trees. Of the agricultural land, 0.1% is used for growing crops and 2.1% is pastures and 24.0% is used for alpine pastures. Of the water in the municipality, 0.2% is in lakes and 0.6% is in rivers and streams. Of the unproductive areas, 4.2% is unproductive vegetation, 32.3% is too rocky for vegetation and 1.1% of the land is covered by glaciers.

The former municipality is located in the Sierre district, on the right bank of the Rhone river. The municipality stretches from an elevation of 900 to 3,177 m (2,953 to 10,423 ft). It consists of the villages of Mollens and Cordona, the scattered settlements of Conzor, Laques and Saint-Maurice-de-Laques as well as the resort village of Aminona.

== Coat of arms ==
The blazon of the municipal coat of arms is Gules, a Mill-wheel Argent, in chief dexter a Sun in Splendour Or and sinister a Grape of the same slipped Vert.

== Demographics ==
Mollens has a population (as of 2015) of 269. As of 2008, 23.6% of the population are resident foreign nationals. Over the last 10 years (2000–2010 ) the population has changed at a rate of 27.4%. It has changed at a rate of 29.7% due to migration and at a rate of 0.6% due to births and deaths.

Most of the population (as of 2000) speaks French (593 or 77.0%) as their first language, German is the second most common (102 or 13.2%) and Italian is the third (26 or 3.4%). There is 1 person who speaks Romansh.

As of 2008, the population was 51.2% male and 48.8% female. The population was made up of 329 Swiss men (37.2% of the population) and 124 (14.0%) non-Swiss men. There were 331 Swiss women (37.4%) and 100 (11.3%) non-Swiss women. Of the population in the municipality, 199 or about 25.8% were born in Mollens and lived there in 2000. There were 252 or 32.7% who were born in the same canton, while 137 or 17.8% were born somewhere else in Switzerland, and 164 or 21.3% were born outside of Switzerland.

As of 2000, children and teenagers (0–19 years old) make up 21.6% of the population, while adults (20–64 years old) make up 61.7% and seniors (over 64 years old) make up 16.8%.

As of 2000, there were 289 people who were single and never married in the municipality. There were 396 married individuals, 32 widows or widowers and 53 individuals who are divorced.

As of 2000, there were 302 private households in the municipality, and an average of 2.2 persons per household. There were 102 households that consist of only one person and 14 households with five or more people. In 2000, a total of 292 apartments (29.5% of the total) were permanently occupied, while 655 apartments (66.2%) were seasonally occupied and 43 apartments (4.3%) were empty. As of 2009, the construction rate of new housing units was 14.7 new units per 1000 residents.

The historical population is given in the following chart:

== Heritage sites of national significance ==
The Fairy Rock (French: Rocher des Fées) is listed as a Swiss heritage site of national significance.

== Politics ==
In the 2007 federal election the most popular party was the CVP which received 44.47% of the vote. The next three most popular parties were the SVP (21.17%), the SP (16.22%) and the FDP (9.01%). In the federal election, a total of 365 votes were cast, and the voter turnout was 67.8%.

In the 2009 Conseil d'État/Staatsrat election a total of 302 votes were cast, of which 35 or about 11.6% were invalid. The voter participation was 56.2%, which is similar to the cantonal average of 54.67%. In the 2007 Swiss Council of States election a total of 361 votes were cast, of which 37 or about 10.2% were invalid. The voter participation was 69.4%, which is much more than the cantonal average of 59.88%.

== Economy ==
As of 2010, Mollens had an unemployment rate of 4.8%. As of 2008, there were 7 people employed in the primary economic sector and about 2 businesses involved in this sector. 38 people were employed in the secondary sector and there were 7 businesses in this sector. 57 people were employed in the tertiary sector, with 16 businesses in this sector. There were 384 residents of the municipality who were employed in some capacity, of which females made up 45.1% of the workforce.

In 2008 the total number of full-time equivalent jobs was 82. The number of jobs in the primary sector was 4, all of which were in agriculture. The number of jobs in the secondary sector was 37 of which 3 or (8.1%) were in manufacturing and 34 (91.9%) were in construction. The number of jobs in the tertiary sector was 41. In the tertiary sector; 6 or 14.6% were in wholesale or retail sales or the repair of motor vehicles, 27 or 65.9% were in a hotel or restaurant, .

In 2000, there were 49 workers who commuted into the municipality and 294 workers who commuted away. The municipality is a net exporter of workers, with about 6.0 workers leaving the municipality for every one entering. Of the working population, 7.8% used public transportation to get to work, and 72.1% used a private car.

== Religion ==
From the 2000 census, 581 or 75.5% were Roman Catholic, while 84 or 10.9% belonged to the Swiss Reformed Church. Of the rest of the population, there were 6 members of an Orthodox church (or about 0.78% of the population), and there were 16 individuals (or about 2.08% of the population) who belonged to another Christian church. There were 4 (or about 0.52% of the population) who were Islamic. There was 1 person who was Buddhist and 2 individuals who belonged to another church. 57 (or about 7.40% of the population) belonged to no church, are agnostic or atheist, and 27 individuals (or about 3.51% of the population) did not answer the question.

== Education ==
In Mollens about 264 or (34.3%) of the population have completed non-mandatory upper secondary education, and 135 or (17.5%) have completed additional higher education (either university or a Fachhochschule). Of the 135 who completed tertiary schooling, 44.4% were Swiss men, 30.4% were Swiss women, 15.6% were non-Swiss men and 9.6% were non-Swiss women.

As of 2000, there were 111 students from Mollens who attended schools outside the municipality.
