= Lens, Switzerland =

Lens
- Municipality
- The village of Lens

- Flag Coat of arms
- Location of Lens
- Location within Switzerland Location within Canton of Valais
- Coordinates: 46°16′50″N 7°26′50″E
- Country: Switzerland
- Canton: Valais
- District: Sierre

Government
  - Mayor: David Bagnoud

Area
  - Total: 13.86 km^{2} (5.35 sq mi)
- Elevation: 1,129 m (3,704 ft)

Population (2002)
  - Total: 3,470
  - Density: 250/km^{2} (648/sq mi)
- Demonym: Les Lensards
- Time zone: UTC+01:00 (CET)
  - Summer (DST): UTC+02:00 (CEST)
- Postal code: 1978
- SFOS number: 6240
- ISO 3166 code: CH-VS
- Localities: Crans-sur-Sierre, Flanthey, Chelin
- Surrounded by: Saint-Léonard, Icogne, Randogne, Montana, Chermignon, Sierre
- Website: www.lens.ch

Lens (French pronunciation: [lɛ̃s]) is a municipality in the district of Sierre in the canton of Valais in Switzerland.

== History ==
Lens is first mentioned in 1177 as de Lenz.

== Geography ==
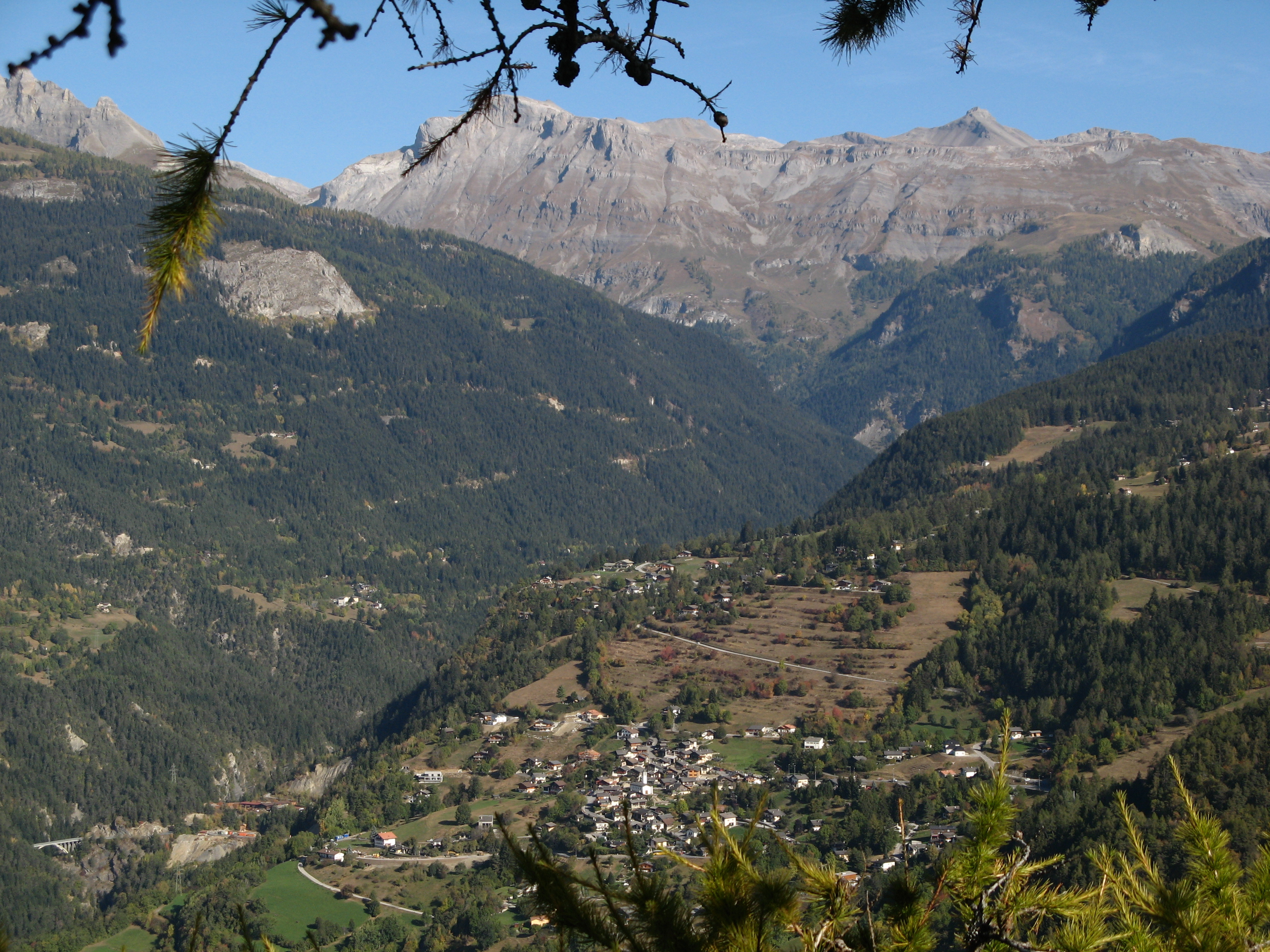
Lens village and surroundings

Aerial view (1955)

Lens has an area, as of 2009, of 13.9 square kilometers (5.4 mi^{2}). Of this area, 5.07 km^{2} (1.96 mi^{2}) or 36.4% is used for agricultural purposes, while 5.48 km^{2} (2.12 mi^{2}) or 39.4% is forested. Of the rest of the land, 2.74 km^{2} (1.06 mi^{2}) or 19.7% is settled (buildings or roads), 0.1 km^{2} (25 acres) or 0.7% is either rivers or lakes and 0.46 km^{2} (0.18 mi^{2}) or 3.3% is unproductive land.

Of the built up area, housing and buildings made up 11.2% and transportation infrastructure made up 4.0%. while parks, green belts and sports fields made up 3.8%. Out of the forested land, 33.6% of the total land area is heavily forested and 5.8% is covered with orchards or small clusters of trees. Of the agricultural land, 0.4% is used for growing crops and 11.6% is pastures, while 9.1% is used for orchards or vine crops and 15.3% is used for alpine pastures. All the water in the municipality is in lakes.

The municipality is located in the Sierre district, on the right bank of the Rhone. It consists of the villages of Lens, Chelin, Flanthey, Vaas, Saint-Clément and Valençon as well as a portion of the resort of Crans-Montana.

It is perched on the saddle of a hill that projects out into the valley. The adjacent hilltop features a bronze statue of Christ, some 28 meters (92 ft) in height. The statue, and the ornate chapel in its base, can be visited on foot by following a path up through the surrounding woods. The path is marked by a series of shrines depicting the Stations of the Cross. The platform at the top commands views up and down the Rhone valley, from Martigny (to the west), as far as Leuk (to the east).

== Coat of arms ==
The blazon of the municipal coat of arms is Azure four Mullets of Five Or between two Keys of the same in Saltire.

== Demographics ==
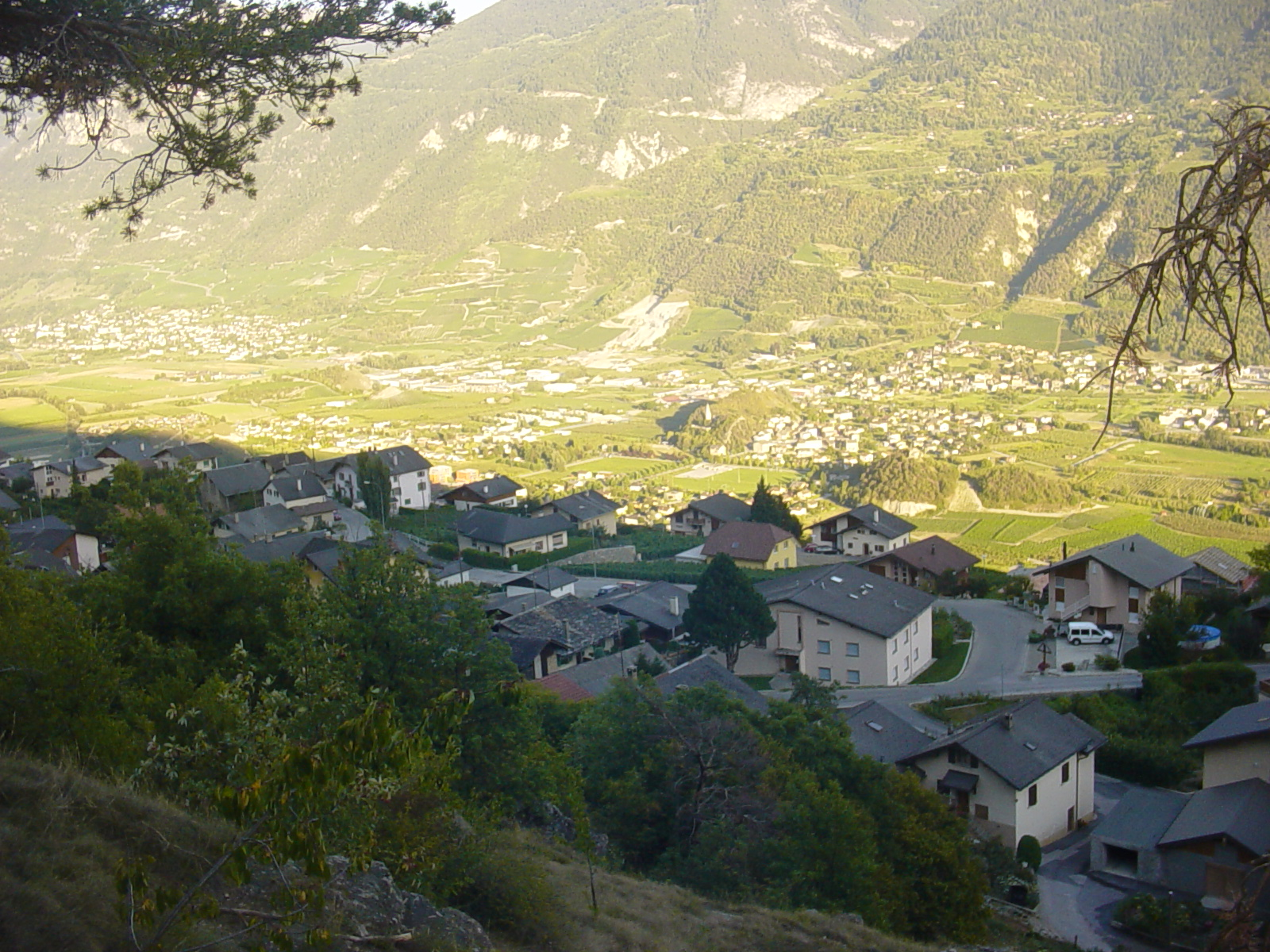
Chelin village in Lens

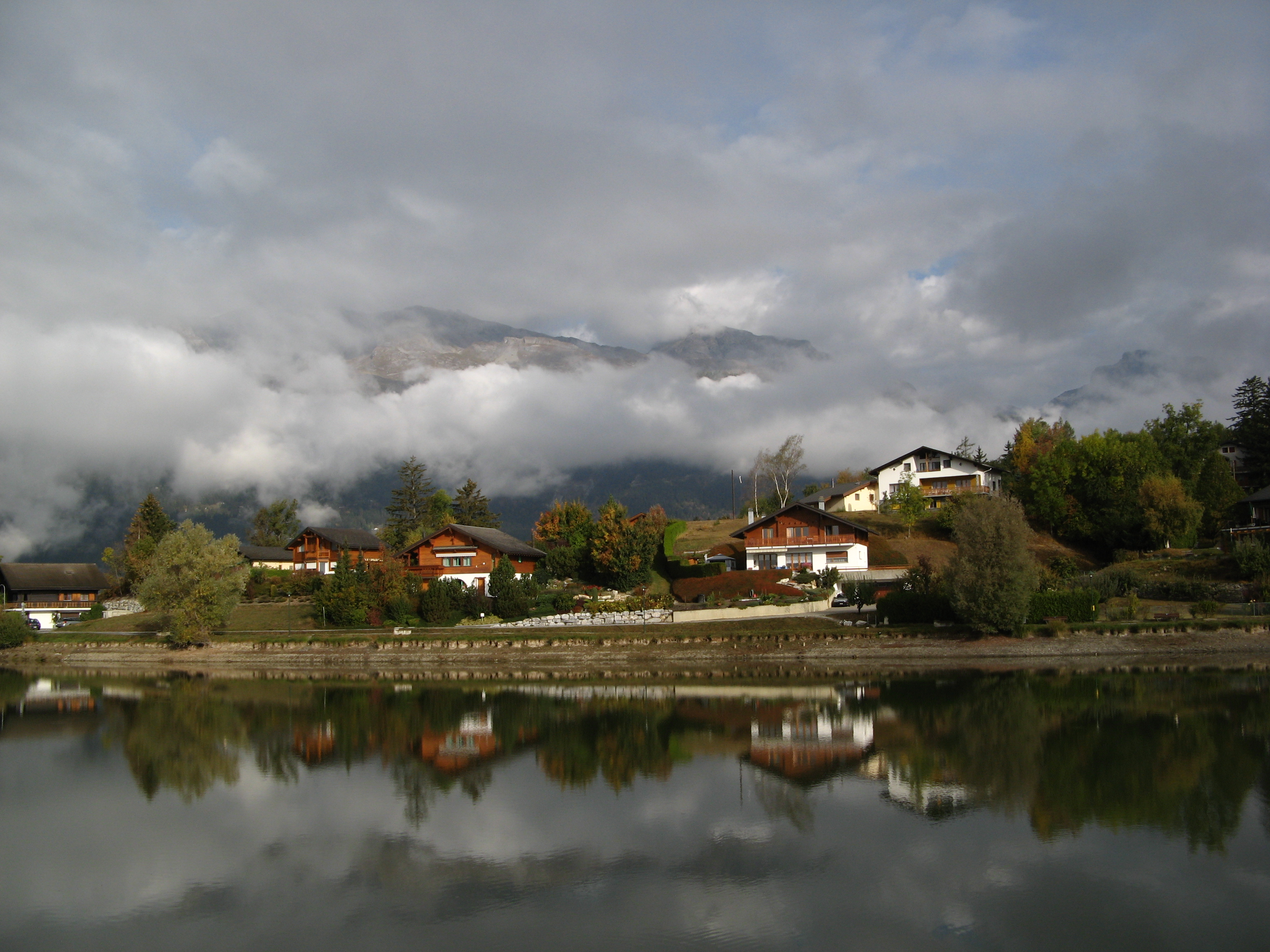
Le Louche lake in Lens

Lens has a population (as of December 2020) of 4,317. As of 2008, 28.6% of the population are resident foreign nationals. Over the last 10 years (2000–2010) the population has changed at a rate of 9.8%. It has changed at a rate of 11.9% due to migration and at a rate of 0% due to births and deaths.

Most of the population (as of 2000) speaks French (2,876 or 85.7%) as their first language, German is the second most common (128 or 3.8%) and Italian is the third (110 or 3.3%). There is 1 person who speaks Romansh.

As of 2008, the population was 48.9% male and 51.1% female. The population was made up of 1,267 Swiss men (33.7% of the population) and 573 (15.2%) non-Swiss men. There were 1,396 Swiss women (37.1%) and 529 (14.1%) non-Swiss women. Of the population in the municipality, 1,481 or about 44.1% were born in Lens and lived there in 2000. There were 624 or 18.6% who were born in the same canton, while 290 or 8.6% were born somewhere else in Switzerland, and 861 or 25.6% were born outside of Switzerland.

As of 2000, children and teenagers (0–19 years old) make up 21.3% of the population, while adults (20–64 years old) make up 58.6% and seniors (over 64 years old) make up 20.2%.

As of 2000, there were 1,235 people who were single and never married in the municipality. There were 1,716 married individuals, 248 widows or widowers and 158 individuals who are divorced.

As of 2000, there were 1,406 private households in the municipality, and an average of 2.3 persons per household. There were 483 households that consist of only one person and 87 households with five or more people. In 2000, a total of 1,301 apartments (37.6% of the total) were permanently occupied, while 2,073 apartments (59.9%) were seasonally occupied and 85 apartments (2.5%) were empty. As of 2009, the construction rate of new housing units was 8.5 new units per 1000 residents. The vacancy rate for the municipality, in 2010, was 7.46%.

The historical population is given in the following chart:

== Sights ==
The entire village of Lens is designated as part of the Inventory of Swiss Heritage Sites.

== Politics ==
In the 2007 federal election the most popular party was the CVP which received 36.06% of the vote. The next three most popular parties were the FDP (24.32%), the SVP (18.75%) and the SP (12.34%). In the federal election, a total of 1,416 votes were cast, and the voter turnout was 64.2%.

In the 2009 Conseil d'État/Staatsrat election a total of 1,287 votes were cast, of which 104 or about 8.1% were invalid. The voter participation was 59.2%, which is similar to the cantonal average of 54.67%. In the 2007 Swiss Council of States election a total of 1,391 votes were cast, of which 99 or about 7.1% were invalid. The voter participation was 64.1%, which is similar to the cantonal average of 59.88%.

== Economy ==
As of 2010, Lens had an unemployment rate of 3.7%. As of 2008, there were 181 people employed in the primary economic sector and about 54 businesses involved in this sector. 184 people were employed in the secondary sector and there were 29 businesses in this sector. 974 people were employed in the tertiary sector, with 149 businesses in this sector. There were 1,554 residents of the municipality who were employed in some capacity, of which females made up 42.2% of the workforce.

In 2008 the total number of full-time equivalent jobs was 1,036. The number of jobs in the primary sector was 105, all of which were in agriculture. The number of jobs in the secondary sector was 173 of which 37 or (21.4%) were in manufacturing and 136 (78.6%) were in construction. The number of jobs in the tertiary sector was 758. In the tertiary sector; 176 or 23.2% were in wholesale or retail sales or the repair of motor vehicles, 44 or 5.8% were in the movement and storage of goods, 146 or 19.3% were in a hotel or restaurant, 6 or 0.8% were in the information industry, 37 or 4.9% were the insurance or financial industry, 71 or 9.4% were technical professionals or scientists, 65 or 8.6% were in education and 75 or 9.9% were in health care.

In 2000, there were 401 workers who commuted into the municipality and 952 workers who commuted away. The municipality is a net exporter of workers, with about 2.4 workers leaving the municipality for every one entering. Of the working population, 7.2% used public transportation to get to work, and 68.9% used a private car.

== Religion ==
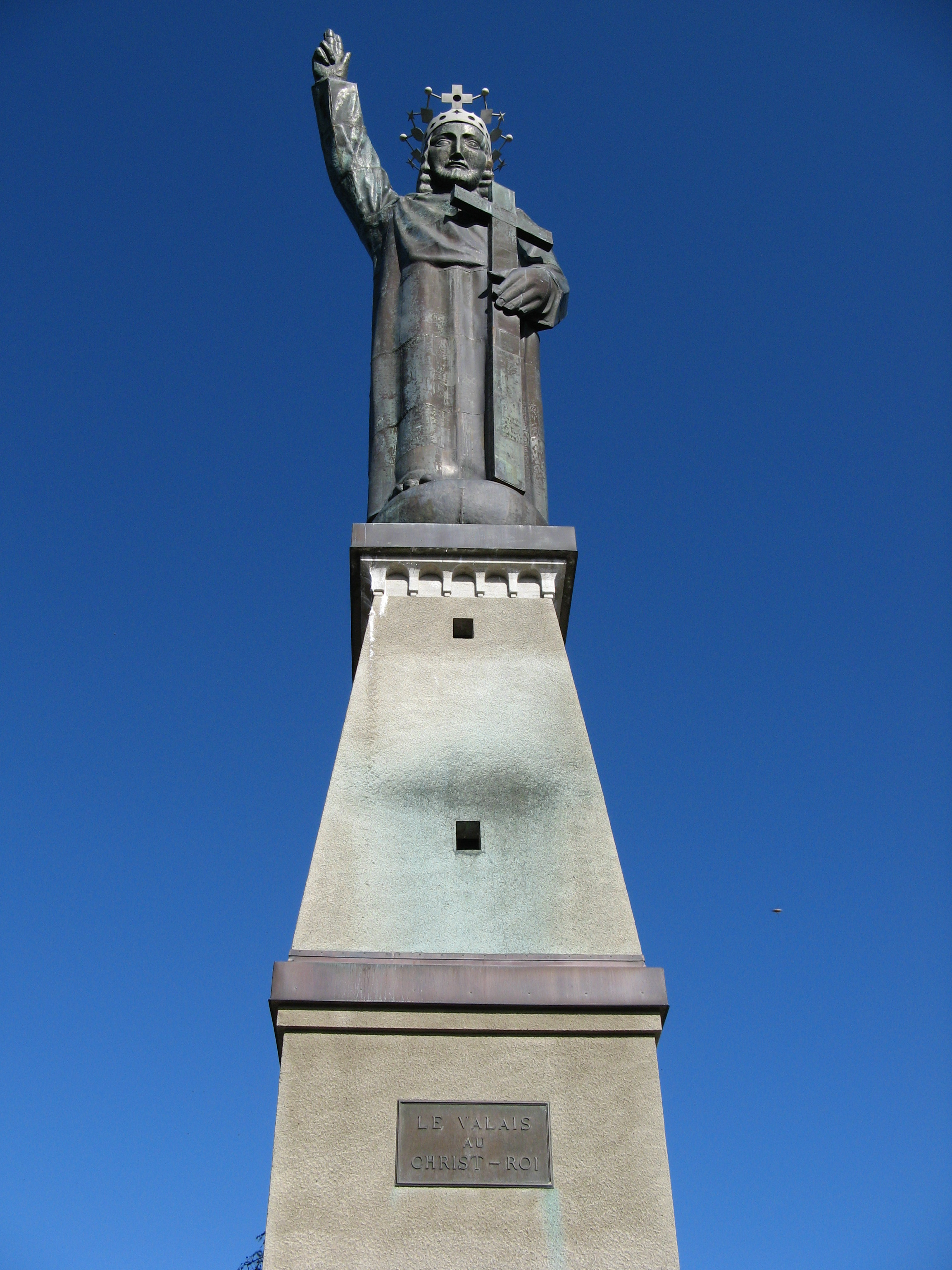
Statue du Christ Roi above Lens village

From the 2000 census, 2,674 or 79.7% were Roman Catholic, while 179 or 5.3% belonged to the Swiss Reformed Church. Of the rest of the population, there were 58 members of an Orthodox church (or about 1.73% of the population), there were 2 individuals (or about 0.06% of the population) who belonged to the Christian Catholic Church, and there were 19 individuals (or about 0.57% of the population) who belonged to another Christian church. There were 26 individuals (or about 0.77% of the population) who were Jewish, and 59 (or about 1.76% of the population) who were Islamic. There was 1 person who was Buddhist and 1 individual who belonged to another church. One hundred and sixty-nine (or about 5.03% of the population) belonged to no church, are agnostic or atheist, and 178 individuals (or about 5.30% of the population) did not answer the question.

== Education ==
In Lens about 1,024 or (30.5%) of the population have completed non-mandatory upper secondary education, and 480 or (14.3%) have completed additional higher education (either university or a Fachhochschule). Of the 480 who completed tertiary schooling, 46.3% were Swiss men, 22.7% were Swiss women, 18.5% were non-Swiss men and 12.5% were non-Swiss women.

As of 2000, there were 31 students in Lens who came from another municipality, while 325 residents attended schools outside the municipality.

Lens is one of the participating municipalities in the Écoles des Villages organization, which maintains six school sites. The schools Flanthey and Lens-Icogne are in the community.
