= Crans-Montana =

Town in Switzerland

- Municipality
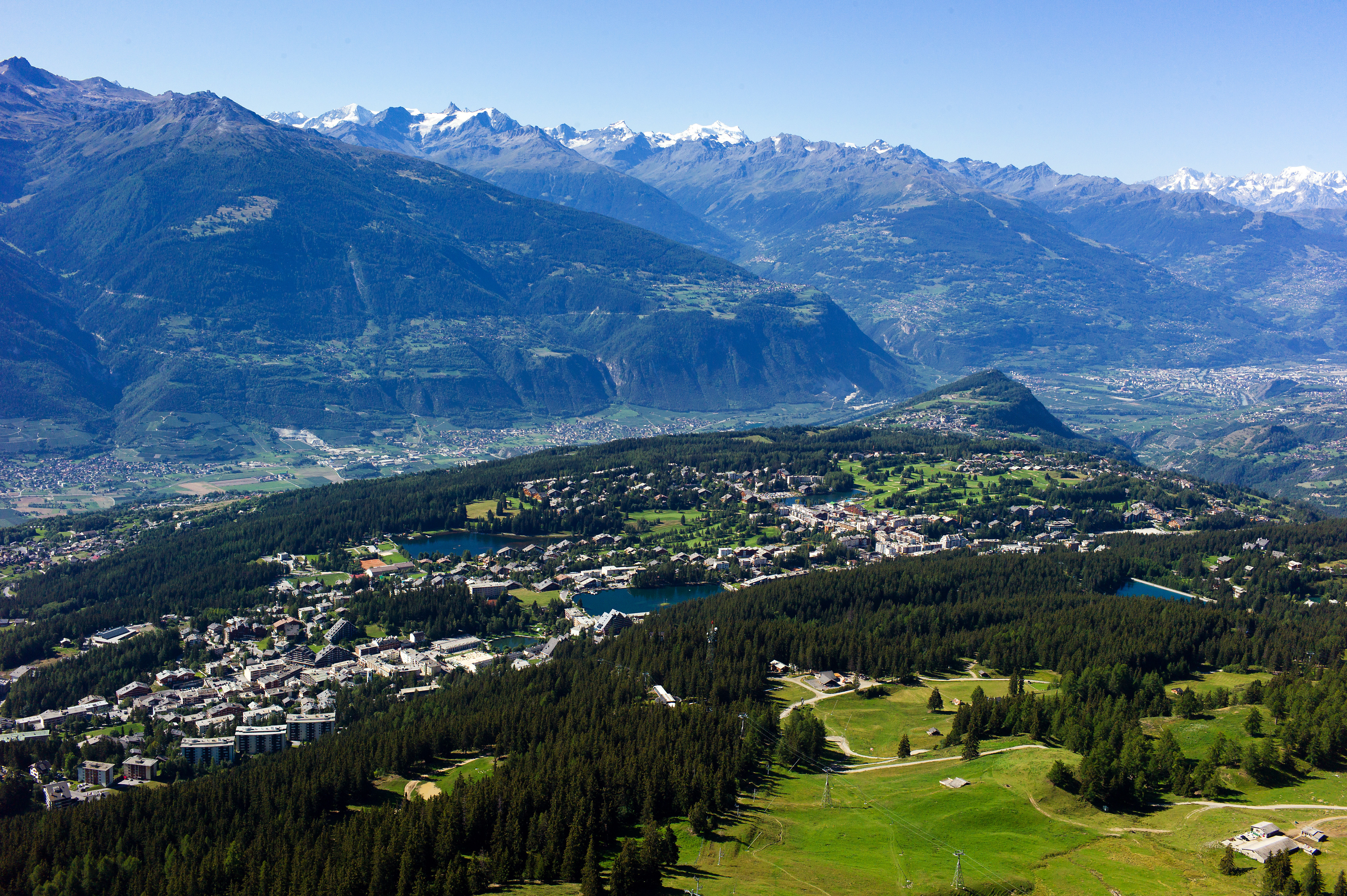
- Aerial view of Crans-Montana

- Flag Coat of arms
- Location of Crans-Montana
- Location within Switzerland Location within Canton of Valais
- Coordinates: 46°18′43″N 7°28′57″E
- Country: Switzerland
- Canton: Valais
- District: Sierre

Area
  - Total: 59.66 km^{2} (23.03 sq mi)
- Highest elevation (Schneehorn): 3,177 m (10,423 ft)

Population (December 2015)
  - Total: 10,931
  - Density: 183.2/km^{2} (474.5/sq mi)
- Time zone: UTC+01:00 (CET)
  - Summer (DST): UTC+02:00 (CEST)
- Postal codes: 3971 Chermignon & Ollon; 3963 Crans-sur-Sierre & Montana; 3974 Mollens; 3975 Randogne
- SFOS number: 6253
- ISO 3166 code: CH-VS
- Surrounded by: Lens, Icogne, Sierre
- Website: https://www.commune-cransmontana.ch/

Logo of the municipality of Crans-Montana

Crans-Montana (French: [kʁɑ̃ mɔ̃tana]) is a municipality and ski resort in the predominantly French-speaking district of Sierre in the canton of Valais, Switzerland. The municipality was formed through the merger of Chermignon, Mollens, Montana and Randogne municipalities on 1 January 2017. The ski resort Crans-Montana was created through the fusion of the two centres of Crans and Montana, and is split between three municipalities, namely Crans-Montana, Icogne, and Lens.

== History ==
=== Chermignon ===
Chermignon is first mentioned in 1228 as Chermenon and Chirminon. It became an independent municipality in 1905 when it separated from Lens.

=== Mollens ===
Mollens is first mentioned about 1250 as Molaen. In 1286 it was mentioned as Moleing. The municipality was formerly known by its German name Molei; however, that name is no longer used.

=== Montana ===
Montana is first mentioned in 1243 as Montana. In 1905 it separated from Lens to form an independent municipality.

=== Randogne ===
Randogne is first mentioned in 1224 as Randonni.

=== 2026 New Year's Eve disaster ===
During the night of 31 December 2025 to 1 January 2026, at around 2026-09-15T00:11 UTC+01:00 [refresh] a.m., a fire at the Le Constellation bar killed 41 people (including many underage individuals) and injured 115, most of them suffering severe burns.

== Ski resort ==
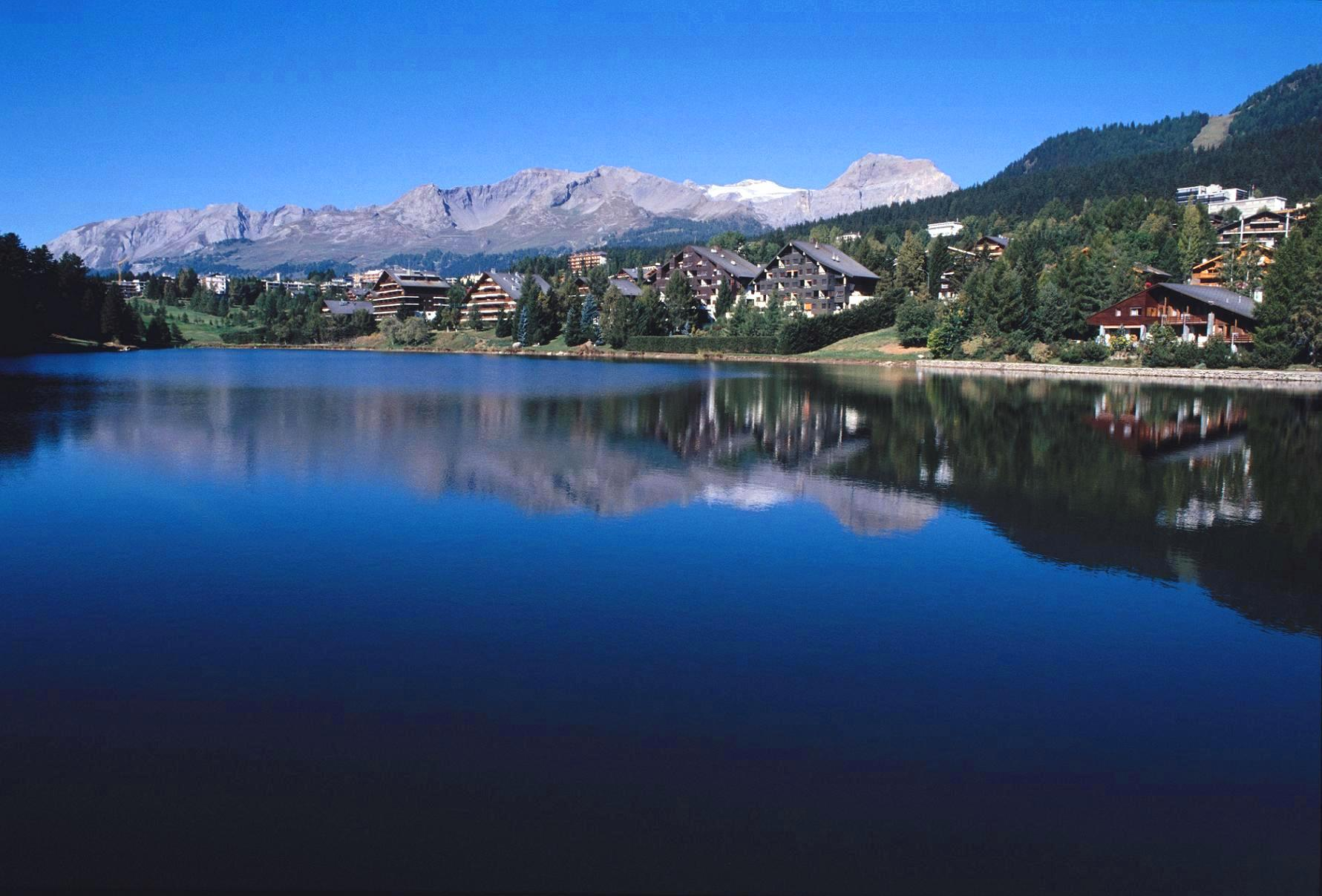
Lake Etang de la Moubra, Crans-Montana

The resort is one of many ski resorts in the Swiss Alps. It is located in the French-speaking part of the canton of Valais on a plateau above Sierre at an elevation of about 1,500 m (4,920 ft) above sea level, with a panoramic view over the Valais Alps and Weisshorn in particular. The resort is a fusion of the two centres of Crans and Montana and belongs to six municipalities (Chermignon, Icogne, Lens, Mollens, Montana and Randogne).

The skiing area of Crans-Montana has 140 km (87 mi) of pistes, and includes the Plaine Morte Glacier. It is topped by the Pointe de la Plaine Morte at 2,927 m (9,600 ft).

Crans-Montana is famous in alpine ski racing for the 1987 World Championships and is often on the World Cup schedule, usually for women's speed events.

On 1 January 2026, at around 1:30 am local time, a fire broke out at the Constellation Bar during a New Year's Eve celebration, killing 41 people and injuring more than 116 others.

== Other activities ==
The area hosts the winter mountain pop rock festival, the Caprices Festival, and a professional golf tournament, the European Tour's Omega European Masters, which takes place each September. The area has also been frequently used for bicycle racing, hosting stage finishes of the Tour de Suisse seven times and of the Tour de Romandie eight times as of 2013. In addition, Crans-Montana also hosted the finish of the 20th stage of the 1984 Tour de France, won by Laurent Fignon, who also took the overall race win that year.

In 2017, Crans-Montana was the site of United Nations–mediated diplomatic talks between Greek and Turkish ministers in an attempt to resolve disputes over their claims in Cyprus. The talks, which also included representatives of the Greek Cypriot and Turkish Cypriot groups, ended stormily and without reaching a solution, with U.N. Secretary General António Guterres participating in heated discussions towards the close of the diplomatic summit.

The Golf-Club Crans-sur-Sierre has four courses, one designed by Seve Ballesteros and another named after Jack Nicklaus.

The internationally renowned Les Roches International School of Hotel Management is located in Crans-Montana.

== Geography ==
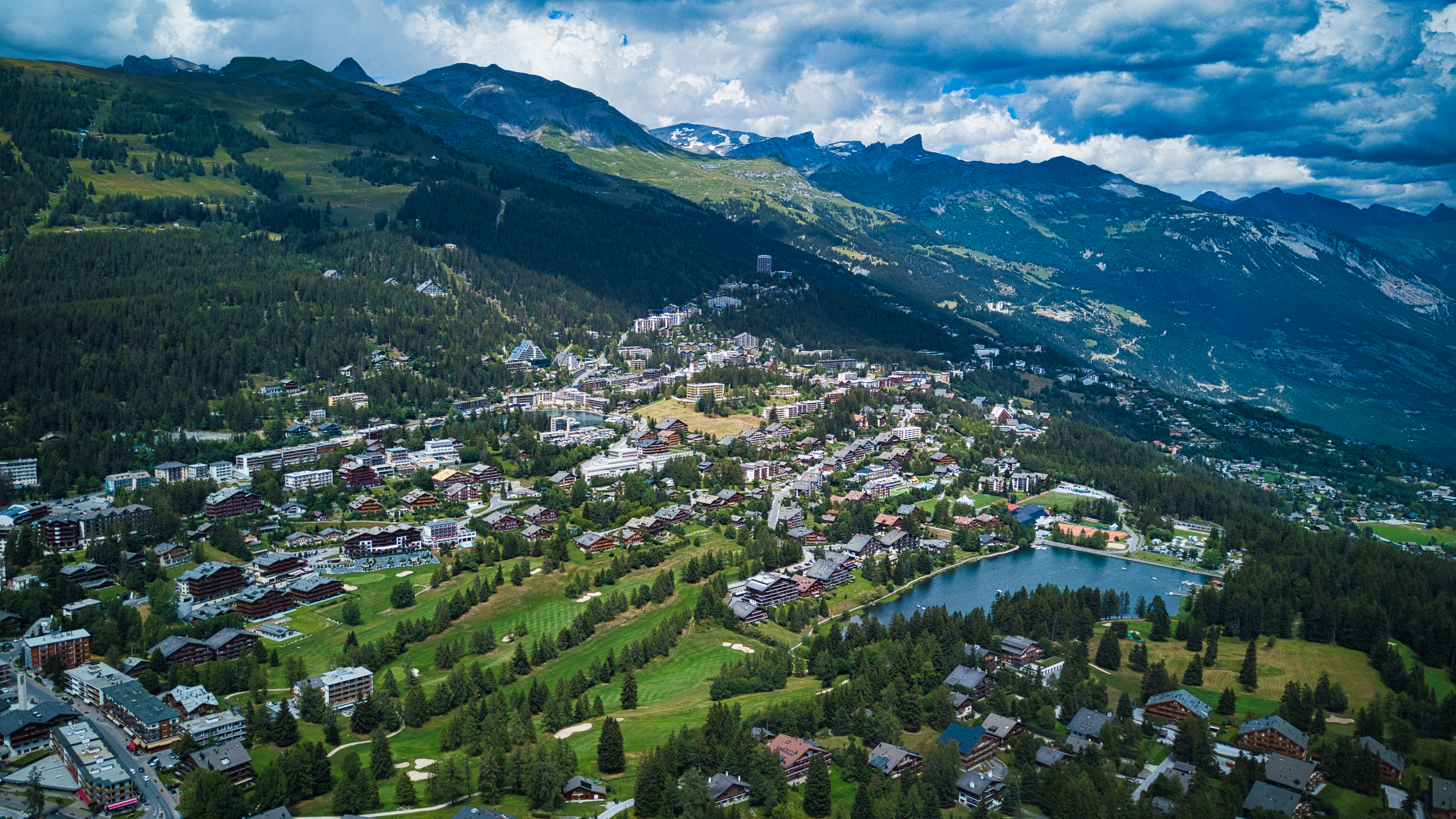
Aerial view of Crans-Montana

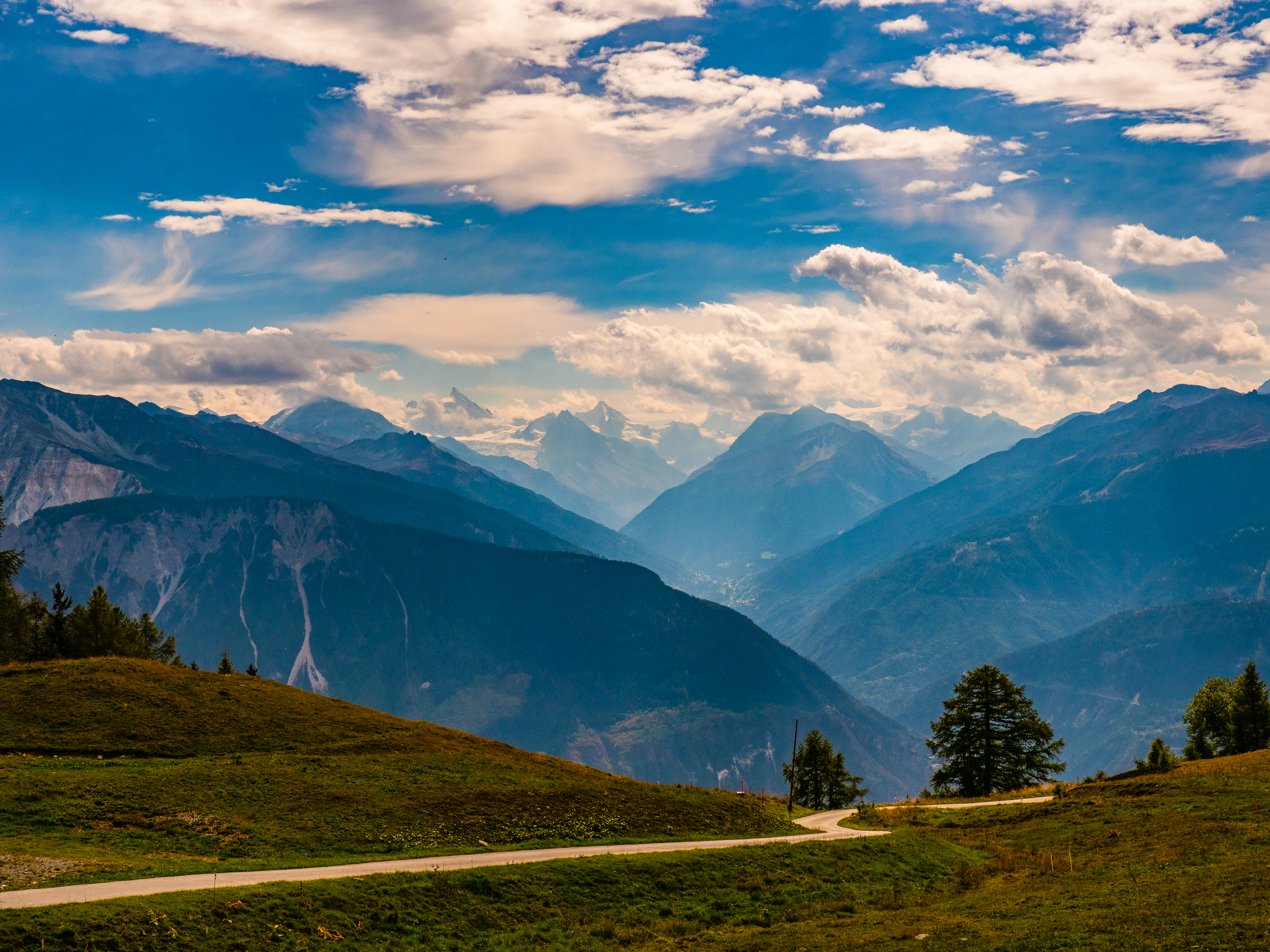
Panoramic view of the surrounding mountains around Crans-Montana

Crans-Montana has an area, as of 2009, of 59.66 km^{2} (23.03 sq mi).

Before the 2017 merger, the territory of present-day Crans-Montana was divided among the former municipalities of Chermignon, Mollens, Montana (Valais) and Randogne. Several settlements and resort areas extended across the boundaries of more than one of these municipalities.

The former municipality of Chermignon comprised Ollon, Chermignon-d'en-Bas, Chermignon-d'en-Haut and part of the Crans-sur-Sierre resort. The hamlet of Champzabé was historically divided between Chermignon, Montana and Sierre.

The former municipality of Mollens included Mollens, Cordona, Conzor, Laques, Saint-Maurice-de-Laques and the high-altitude resort of Aminona.

The former municipality of Montana (Valais) included Montana-Village, Corin and part of Champzabé, while Diogne was divided between Montana and Chermignon. Montana-Vermala developed across the territories of Montana and the former municipality of Randogne.

The former municipality of Randogne comprised the village of Randogne together with Loc, part of Darnona, Bluche, most of Montana-Vermala and Montana-Station.

== Population ==
The municipality has a population (as of December 2020) of 10,218.

== Historic population ==
The historical population is given in the following chart:

== Heritage sites of national significance ==
The Roches des Fées and the Hotel Bella Lui are listed as Swiss heritage site of national significance.

== Climate ==
Crans-Montana has a warm summer humid continental climate, (Dfb) according to the Köppen climate classification. Between 1981 and 2010, Montana had on average 101 days of rain or snow per year and received on average 692 mm (27.2 in) of precipitation. Crans Montana has fairly evenly distributed precipitation throughout the year, as is common in this type of climate. As with other locations in the canton of Valais, annual precipitation rates are quite low due to its location in the rain shadow of some of the tallest mountains in the Alps.

Climate data for Montana (1981–2010)
Month	Jan	Feb	Mar	Apr	May	Jun	Jul	Aug	Sep	Oct	Nov	Dec	Year
Mean daily maximum °C (°F)	1.6 (34.9)	2.2 (36.0)	5.6 (42.1)	9.2 (48.6)	14.1 (57.4)	17.7 (63.9)	20.5 (68.9)	19.8 (67.6)	15.9 (60.6)	11.6 (52.9)	5.4 (41.7)	2.3 (36.1)	10.5 (50.9)
Daily mean °C (°F)	−1.8 (28.8)	−1.7 (28.9)	1.0 (33.8)	4.2 (39.6)	8.9 (48.0)	12.2 (54.0)	14.7 (58.5)	14.2 (57.6)	10.8 (51.4)	7.1 (44.8)	1.8 (35.2)	−0.9 (30.4)	5.9 (42.6)
Mean daily minimum °C (°F)	−4.8 (23.4)	−5 (23)	−2.6 (27.3)	0.3 (32.5)	4.7 (40.5)	7.6 (45.7)	9.9 (49.8)	9.8 (49.6)	6.9 (44.4)	3.8 (38.8)	−1.1 (30.0)	−3.8 (25.2)	2.1 (35.8)
Average precipitation mm (inches)	64 (2.5)	53 (2.1)	47 (1.9)	40 (1.6)	58 (2.3)	62 (2.4)	63 (2.5)	70 (2.8)	48 (1.9)	54 (2.1)	57 (2.2)	74 (2.9)	692 (27.2)
Average snowfall cm (inches)	106 (42)	90 (35)	58 (23)	30 (12)	4 (1.6)	0 (0)	0 (0)	0 (0)	0 (0)	8 (3.1)	40 (16)	89 (35)	425 (167)
Average snowy days (≥ 1.0 cm)	9.3	8.1	7.1	4.5	0.6	0	0	0	0	1.0	5.3	8.1	44.0
Source: MeteoSwiss

== Transport ==
The Funiculaire Sierre–Montana–Crans leads from Montana to Sierre, next to the Sierre/Siders railway station, allowing for rail access to Geneva Airport and Brig via the InterRegio.

== Education ==
Crans-Montana is one of the participating municipalities in the Écoles des Villages organization, which maintains six school sites. School sites in the municipality include Corin, Martelles, Montana-Village, and Randogne-Mollens.

The Bibliothèque de Crans-Montana is the municipality's library.

== Sports ==
=== Winter sports ===
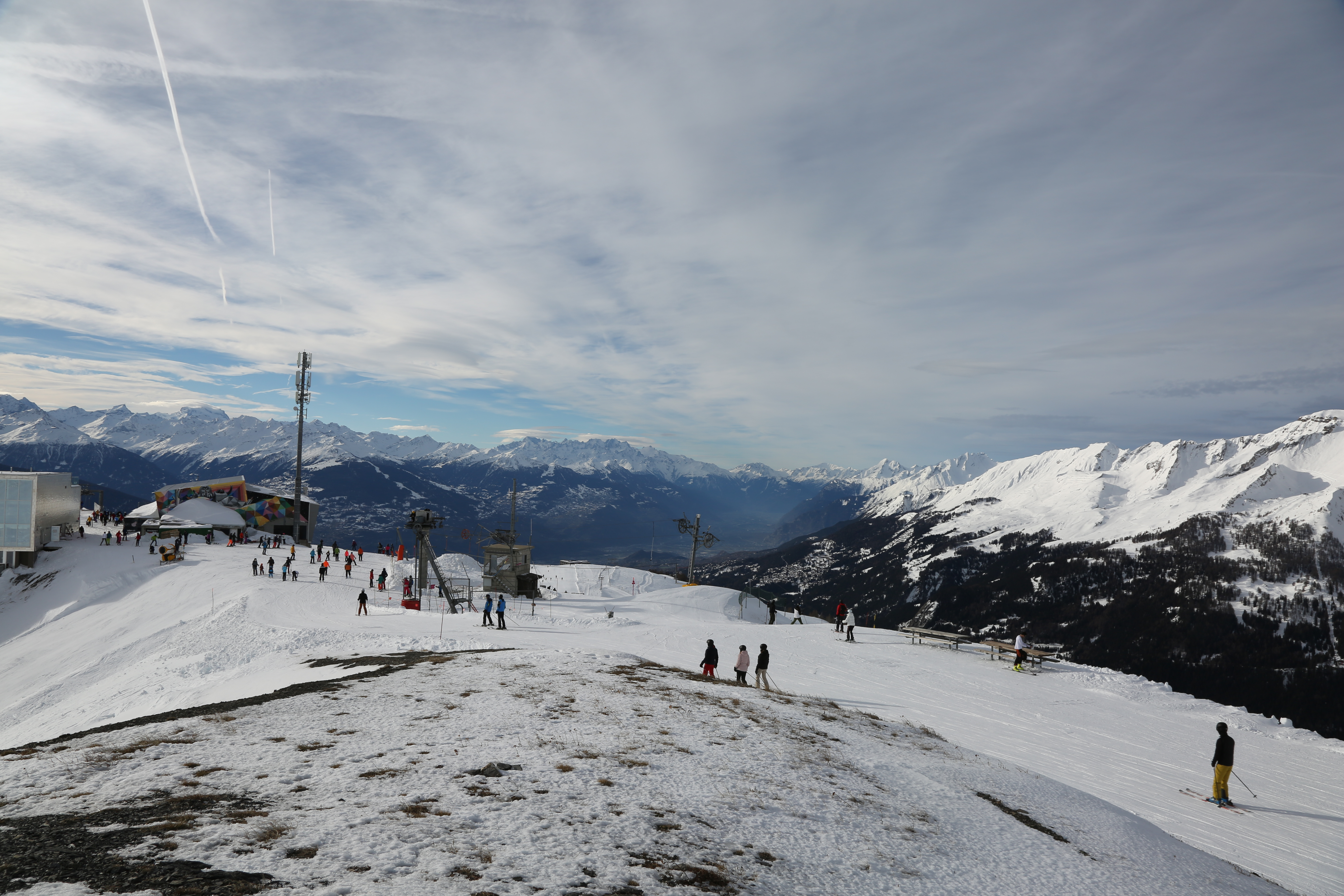
Scenic view of skiing in Crans-Montana

Crans-Montana is a prominent ski resort that developed from the early 20th century (in the Crans-sur-Sierre area) and specializes in alpine skiing. It has hosted the 1987 World Championships, the 2011 Junior World Championships, and numerous stages of the Alpine Skiing World Cup and the European Cup. The resort offers approximately 140 km of slopes.

== Notable people ==
- Elizabeth von Arnim (1866–1941), Australian-born British novelist, lived in Randogne 1910–1930
- Katherine Mansfield (1888–1923), New Zealand-born author, lived in Montana from May 1921–January 1922
- Roger Moore (1927–2017), British actor, owned a chalet at the ski resort for many years after moving from Gstaad. He lived there until his death in 2017.
- Michel Roux (1941–2020), French-born chef and restaurateur who worked in Britain, lived in Crans-Montana from 2008.
- Vicky Safra (born 1952), Greek-born billionaire and philanthropist, wealthiest Brazilian and member of the Safra family.

=== Sport ===
- Several professional golfers including Adam Scott, Ángel Gallardo and Sergio García are residents.
