= Montana, Switzerland =

Former municipality of Valais, Switzerland

Montana
- Former municipality
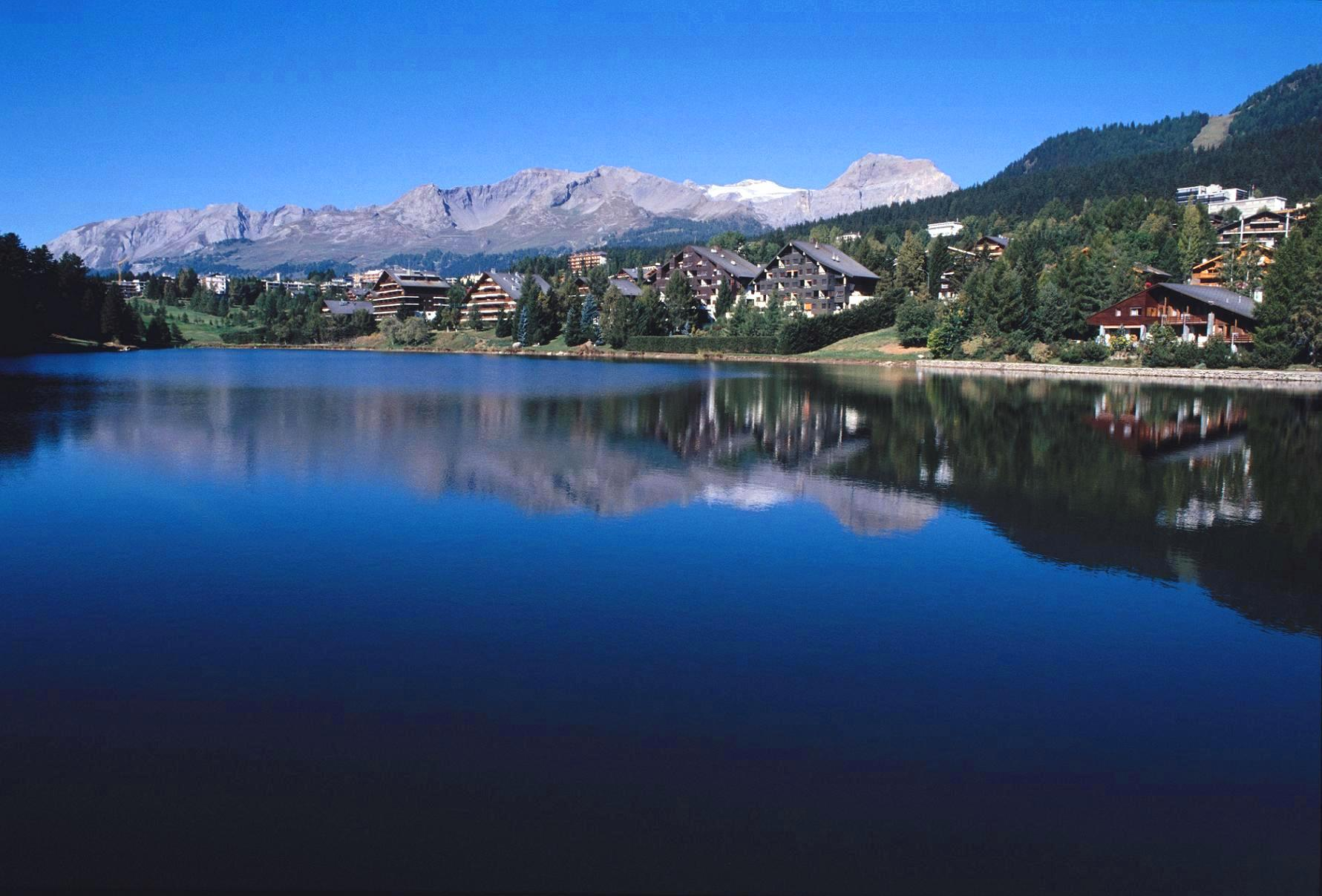

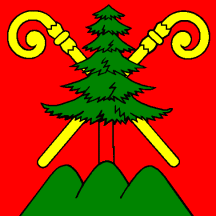
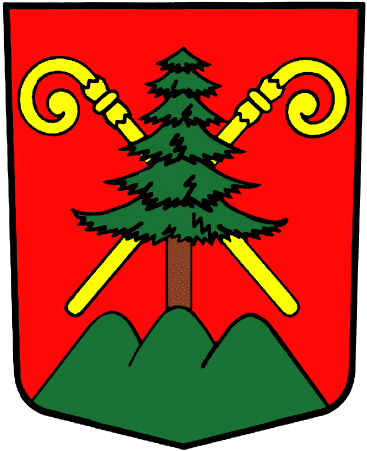
- Flag Coat of arms
- Location of Montana
- Location within Switzerland Location within Canton of Valais
- Coordinates: 46°19′N 7°29′E
- Country: Switzerland
- Canton: Valais
- District: Sierre

Government
  - Mayor: Francis Tapparel

Area
  - Total: 4.9 km^{2} (1.9 sq mi)
- Elevation: 1,495 m (4,905 ft)

Population (December 2007)
  - Total: 2,276
  - Density: 460/km^{2} (1,200/sq mi)
- Time zone: UTC+01:00 (CET)
  - Summer (DST): UTC+02:00 (CEST)
- Postal code: 3963
- SFOS number: 6243
- ISO 3166 code: CH-VS
- Surrounded by: Chermignon, Lens, Randogne, Sierre
- Website: www.commune-cransmontana.ch

Montana (French pronunciation: [mɔ̃tana]) is a former municipality in the district of Sierre in the canton of Valais, Switzerland. It was one of the six municipalities that form the ski resort Crans-Montana (together with Icogne, Lens, Randogne, Mollens and Chermignon). On 1 January 2017 the former municipalities of Chermignon, Mollens (VS), Montana and Randogne merged to form the new municipality of Crans-Montana.

== History ==
Montana is first mentioned in 1243 as Montana. In 1905 it separated from Lens to form an independent municipality.

== Geography ==
Aerial view (1949)

Montana had an area, as of 2009, of 4.9 square kilometers (1.9 mi^{2}). Of this area, 1.26 km^{2} (0.49 mi^{2}) or 25.8% is used for agricultural purposes, while 2.08 km^{2} (0.80 mi^{2}) or 42.5% is forested. Of the rest of the land, 1.4 km^{2} (0.54 mi^{2}) or 28.6% is settled (buildings or roads), 0.08 km^{2} (20 acres) or 1.6% is either rivers or lakes and 0.1 km^{2} (25 acres) or 2.0% is unproductive land.

Of the built up area, housing and buildings made up 15.5% and transportation infrastructure made up 8.2%. while parks, green belts and sports fields made up 3.5%. Out of the forested land, 38.9% of the total land area is heavily forested and 3.7% is covered with orchards or small clusters of trees. Of the agricultural land, 0.6% is used for growing crops and 12.5% is pastures, while 10.4% is used for orchards or vine crops and 2.2% is used for alpine pastures. All the water in the municipality is in lakes. Of the unproductive areas, and 1.2% is too rocky for vegetation.

The former municipality is located in the Sierre district, above the right bank of the Rhone. It consists of the villages of Montana and Corin, part of the Champzabé, the hamlet of Diogne as well as the resort of Montana-Vermala (located at an elevation of 1,500 m (4,900 ft) and shared between Montana and Randogne).

== Coat of arms ==
The blazon of the municipal coat of arms is Gules, two crosiers Or in saltire over those issuant from Coupeaux vert a Pine-tree of the same trunked Gules.

== Demographics ==
Montana had a population (as of 2015) of 2,363. As of 2008, 27.8% of the population are resident foreign nationals. Over the last 10 years (2000–2010 ) the population has changed at a rate of -5.1%. It has changed at a rate of -2.8% due to migration and at a rate of -0.8% due to births and deaths.

Most of the population (as of 2000) speaks French (1,883 or 81.7%) as their first language, German is the second most common (125 or 5.4%) and Italian is the third (109 or 4.7%).

As of 2008, the population was 49.0% male and 51.0% female. The population was made up of 799 Swiss men (35.2% of the population) and 312 (13.8%) non-Swiss men. There were 854 Swiss women (37.6%) and 304 (13.4%) non-Swiss women. Of the population in the municipality, 820 or about 35.6% were born in Montana and lived there in 2000. There were 493 or 21.4% who were born in the same canton, while 268 or 11.6% were born somewhere else in Switzerland, and 639 or 27.7% were born outside of Switzerland.

As of 2000, children and teenagers (0–19 years old) make up 20.8% of the population, while adults (20–64 years old) make up 62% and seniors (over 64 years old) make up 17.2%.

As of 2000, there were 903 people who were single and never married in the municipality. There were 1,168 married individuals, 129 widows or widowers and 105 individuals who are divorced.

As of 2000, there were 998 private households in the municipality, and an average of 2.2 persons per household. There were 382 households that consist of only one person and 49 households with five or more people. In 2000, a total of 874 apartments (39.8% of the total) were permanently occupied, while 1,284 apartments (58.5%) were seasonally occupied and 37 apartments (1.7%) were empty. As of 2009, the construction rate of new housing units was 0.9 new units per 1000 residents. The vacancy rate for the municipality, in 2010, was 1.56%.

The historical population is given in the following chart:

== Heritage sites of national significance ==
The Hotel Bella Lui is listed as a Swiss heritage site of national significance.

== Politics ==
In the 2007 federal election the most popular party was the CVP which received 42.96% of the vote. The next three most popular parties were the SVP (18.8%), the SP (17.03%) and the FDP (12.83%). In the federal election, a total of 872 votes were cast, and the voter turnout was 59.6%.

In the 2009 Conseil d'État/Staatsrat election a total of 758 votes were cast, of which 67 or about 8.8% were invalid. The voter participation was 53.2%, which is similar to the cantonal average of 54.67%. In the 2007 Swiss Council of States election a total of 848 votes were cast, of which 49 or about 5.8% were invalid. The voter participation was 60.3%, which is similar to the cantonal average of 59.88%.

== Economy ==
As of 2010, Montana had an unemployment rate of 4%. As of 2008, there were 64 people employed in the primary economic sector and about 29 businesses involved in this sector. 206 people were employed in the secondary sector and there were 23 businesses in this sector. 1,054 people were employed in the tertiary sector, with 135 businesses in this sector. There were 1,199 residents of the municipality who were employed in some capacity, of which females made up 46.3% of the workforce.

In 2008 the total number of full-time equivalent jobs was 1,141. The number of jobs in the primary sector was 31, all of which were in agriculture. The number of jobs in the secondary sector was 192 of which 28 or (14.6%) were in manufacturing and 163 (84.9%) were in construction. The number of jobs in the tertiary sector was 918. In the tertiary sector; 188 or 20.5% were in wholesale or retail sales or the repair of motor vehicles, 22 or 2.4% were in the movement and storage of goods, 272 or 29.6% were in a hotel or restaurant, 1 was in the information industry, 14 or 1.5% were the insurance or financial industry, 18 or 2.0% were technical professionals or scientists, 123 or 13.4% were in education and 166 or 18.1% were in health care.

In 2000, there were 1,250 workers who commuted into the municipality and 527 workers who commuted away. The municipality is a net importer of workers, with about 2.4 workers entering the municipality for every one leaving. Of the working population, 6.6% used public transportation to get to work, and 55% used a private car.

== Religion ==
From the 2000 census, 1,816 or 78.8% were Roman Catholic, while 158 or 6.9% belonged to the Swiss Reformed Church. Of the rest of the population, there were 91 members of an Orthodox church (or about 3.95% of the population), and there were 23 individuals (or about 1.00% of the population) who belonged to another Christian church. There were 10 individuals (or about 0.43% of the population) who were Jewish, and 19 (or about 0.82% of the population) who were Islamic. There were 3 individuals who were Buddhist and 1 individual who belonged to another church. 87 (or about 3.77% of the population) belonged to no church, are agnostic or atheist, and 107 individuals (or about 4.64% of the population) did not answer the question.

== Climate ==
Between 1991 and 2020 Montana had an average of 103.8 days of rain or snow per year and on average received 834 mm (32.8 in) of precipitation. The wettest month was December during which time Montana received an average of 96 mm (3.8 in) of rain or snow. During this month there was precipitation for an average of 9.0 days. The month with the most days of precipitation was June, with an average of 10.3, but with only 73 mm (2.9 in) of rain or snow. The driest month of the year was April with an average of 49 mm (1.9 in) of precipitation over 7.5 days. According to the Köppen Climate Classification system, Montana has a marine west coast climate, abbreviated "Cfb" on climate maps.

Climate data for Montana, elevation 1,423 m (4,669 ft), (1991–2020)
Month	Jan	Feb	Mar	Apr	May	Jun	Jul	Aug	Sep	Oct	Nov	Dec	Year
Mean daily maximum °C (°F)	1.8 (35.2)	2.4 (36.3)	6.3 (43.3)	10.2 (50.4)	14.5 (58.1)	18.5 (65.3)	20.8 (69.4)	20.3 (68.5)	16.0 (60.8)	11.7 (53.1)	5.9 (42.6)	2.6 (36.7)	10.9 (51.6)
Daily mean °C (°F)	−1.6 (29.1)	−1.5 (29.3)	1.8 (35.2)	5.2 (41.4)	9.3 (48.7)	13.1 (55.6)	15.0 (59.0)	14.8 (58.6)	10.9 (51.6)	7.2 (45.0)	2.3 (36.1)	−0.7 (30.7)	6.3 (43.3)
Mean daily minimum °C (°F)	−5.3 (22.5)	−5.5 (22.1)	−2.5 (27.5)	0.9 (33.6)	4.7 (40.5)	8.1 (46.6)	9.9 (49.8)	9.9 (49.8)	6.5 (43.7)	3.3 (37.9)	−1.3 (29.7)	−4.3 (24.3)	2.0 (35.6)
Average precipitation mm (inches)	76.1 (3.00)	60.5 (2.38)	52.6 (2.07)	49.2 (1.94)	78.1 (3.07)	73.0 (2.87)	80.0 (3.15)	87.5 (3.44)	55.2 (2.17)	58.9 (2.32)	66.9 (2.63)	95.9 (3.78)	833.9 (32.83)
Average snowfall cm (inches)	95.1 (37.4)	85.8 (33.8)	47.8 (18.8)	22.0 (8.7)	1.9 (0.7)	0.0 (0.0)	0.0 (0.0)	0.0 (0.0)	0.0 (0.0)	9.4 (3.7)	37.8 (14.9)	102.8 (40.5)	402.6 (158.5)
Average precipitation days (≥ 1.0 mm)	8.3	7.1	7.8	7.5	10.2	10.3	9.7	10.2	7.6	8.1	8.0	9.0	103.8
Average snowy days (≥ 1.0 cm)	8.9	7.9	5.7	3.2	0.3	0.0	0.0	0.0	0.0	1.3	5.3	8.7	41.3
Average relative humidity (%)	68	68	65	63	67	67	67	69	73	71	71	69	68
Mean monthly sunshine hours	134.3	141.9	181.6	188.6	199.3	219.8	242.7	230.5	199.5	166.6	120.9	115.6	2,141.3
Percentage possible sunshine	54	54	56	53	49	55	59	60	60	56	48	50	55
Source 1: NOAA
Source 2: MeteoSwiss

== Education ==
In Montana about 744 or (32.3%) of the population have completed non-mandatory upper secondary education, and 356 or (15.4%) have completed additional higher education (either university or a Fachhochschule). Of the 356 who completed tertiary schooling, 39.9% were Swiss men, 28.9% were Swiss women, 18.5% were non-Swiss men and 12.6% were non-Swiss women. As of 2000, there were 507 students in Montana who came from another municipality, while 144 residents attended schools outside the municipality.
