= New Poems =

Collection of poems by Rainer Maria Rilke

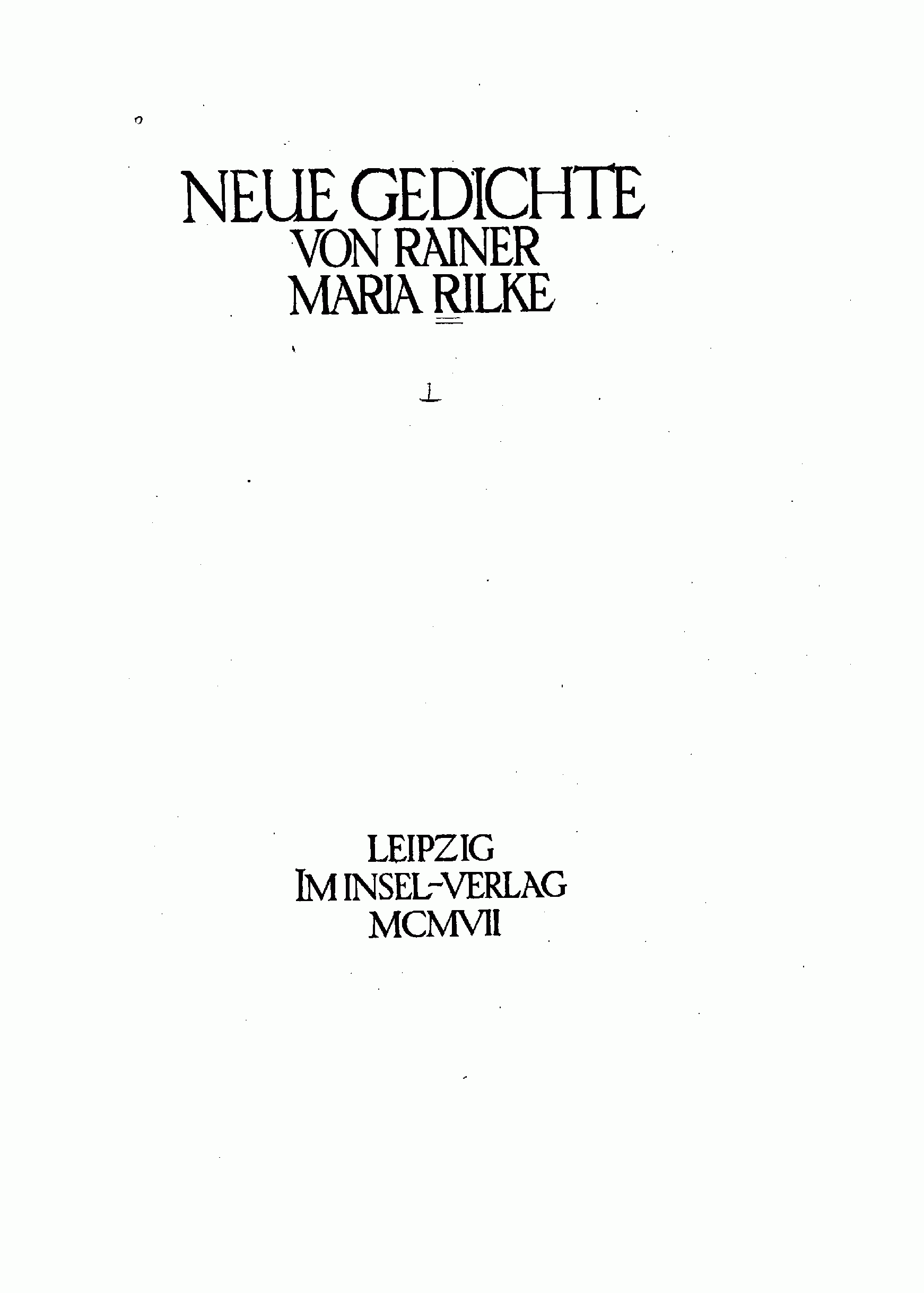
- Title page from Rilke's Neue Gedichte, 1907
- Author: Rainer Maria Rilke
- Original title: Neue Gedichte
- Language: German
- Genre: Poetry
- Publisher: Insel-Verlag
- Publication date: 1907
- Original text: Neue Gedichte at German Wikisource

New Poems (German: Neue Gedichte) is a two-part collection of poems written by Bohemian-Austrian poet and novelist Rainer Maria Rilke (1875–1926). The first volume, dedicated to Elisabeth and Karl von der Heydt was composed from 1902 to 1907 and was published in the same year by Insel Verlag in Leipzig. The second volume (New Poems: The Other Part), dedicated to Auguste Rodin, was completed in 1908 and published by the same publisher. With the exception of eight poems written in Capri, Rilke composed most of them in Paris and Meudon. At the start of each volume he placed, respectively, Früher Apollo (Early Apollo) and Archaïscher Torso Apollos (Archaic Torso of Apollo), poems about sculptures of the poet-God.

These poems, many of them sonnets, are often intensely focused on the visual. They show Rilke aware of the objective world and of the people amongst whom he lives. The poems are astonishingly concentrated: both short, and compacting a profundity of experience into small compass. He called them Dinggedichte (Thing-Poems), intending to reveal both that the poems were about "things" and that the poems had become, so concentrated and whole in themselves were they, things (poetic objects) themselves.

Along with The Notebooks of Malte Laurids Brigge, the collection is considered to be the main work of his middle period, which clearly stands out from the work preceding and following it. It marks a shift from the emotive poetry of ecstatic subjectivity and interiority, which somewhat dominates his three-part The Book of Hours, to the objective language of the Dinggedicte. With this new poetic orientation, which was influenced by the visual arts and especially Rodin, Rilke came to be considered one of the most important poets of literary modernism.

== Background ==
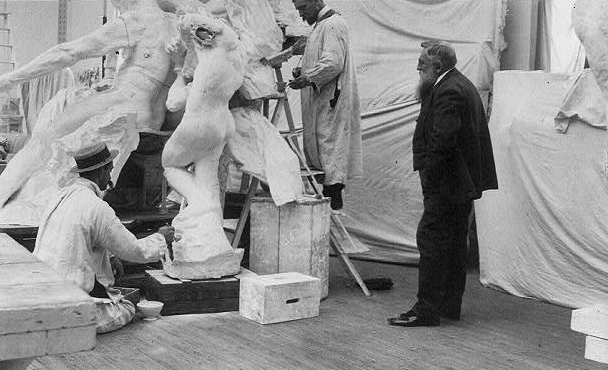
Rodin in the studio, 1905

Because the collection lacks a cohesive meaning as well as an overarching central concept, it is no cycle of poems in the strict sense. On the other hand, it cannot be concluded to be an arbitrary compilation, because despite the great diversity of forms and genres, everything is permeated by a coherent formal principle – the 'thing' aspect of lyrical speech, which is bound to the experience of observed reality.

The Dinglyrik ("thing-lyric") of the Parnassians through to Eduard Mörike and Conrad Ferdinand Meyer had not been oriented towards music, as in romantic poetry, but rather the visual arts. This point of reference is also noticeable in Rilke's poems. Firstly in the towering figure of the sculptor Auguste Rodin, (who Rilke wrote a monograph about while acting as his private secretary), and later in Rilke's encounter with the work of Paul Cézanne, at the Paris Cézanne exhibition of 1907.

== Origin and Language crisis ==
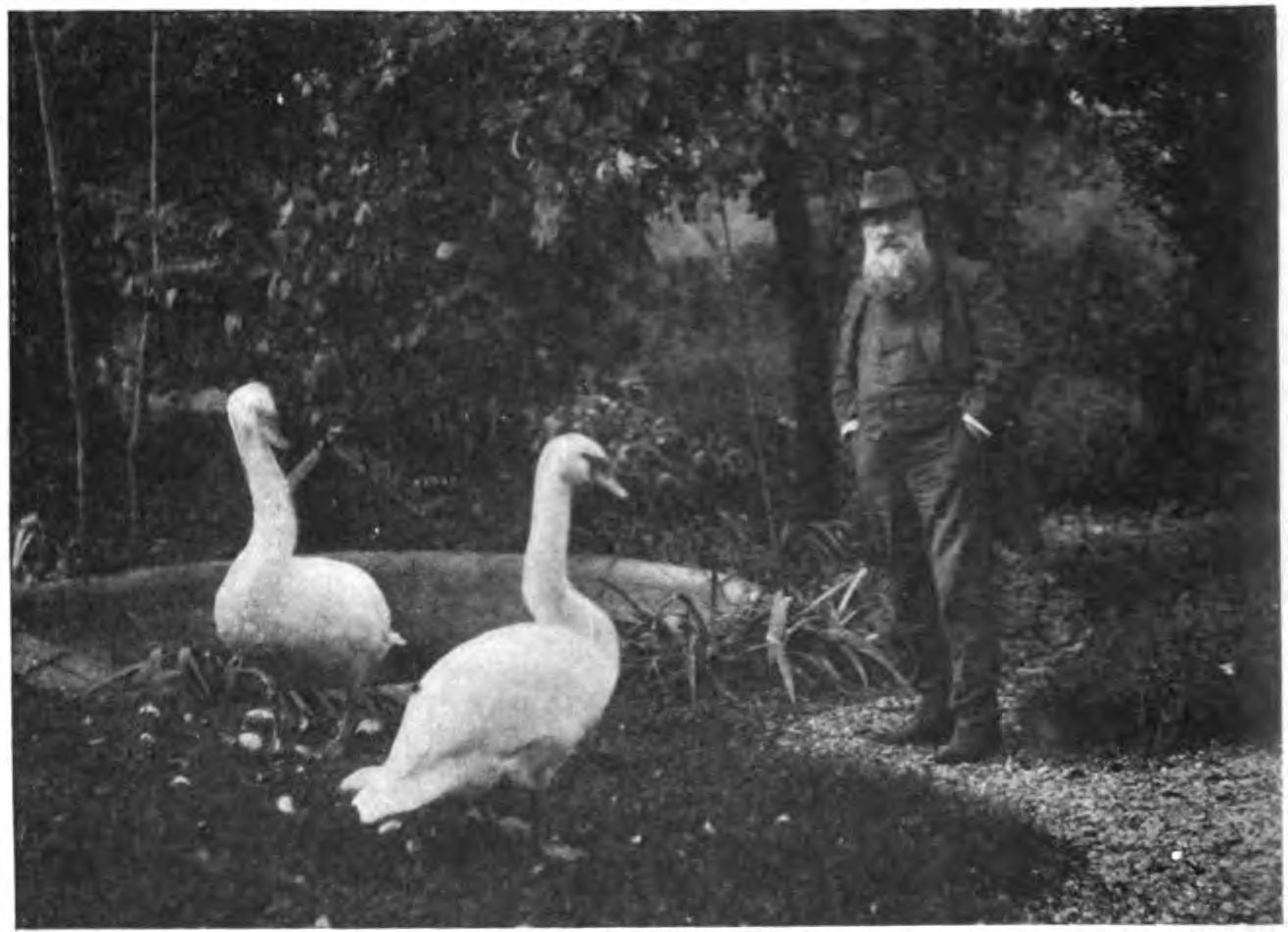
Rodin at Meudon, where Rilke worked as secretary

The poems reflect Rilke's impressions of his environment, and experiences, which he sometimes confided to Lou Andreas-Salomé or Clara Westhoff in numerous letters with a great wealth of detail. They also describe his own influences in the objects of reality-oriented art. The poems also stand at the end of a long development process: A year after he completed the monograph on Rodin, he told Lou Andreas-Salomé how desperately he was looking for a craft-like foundation for his art, a tool that would give his art the necessary solidity. He excluded two possibilities: The new craft should not be the craft of language itself, but rather an attempt "to find a better understanding of inner life". Likewise, the humanistic way of education that Hugo von Hofmannsthal had undertaken, the foundation "to seek a well-inherited and increasing culture" did not appeal to him. The poetic craft should rather be seeing itself, the ability to "see better, to look with more patience, with more immersion."

Rilke was fascinated by both artisanal precision and concentration on the subject, a way of working which he observed frequently with Rodin. The formal nature of art and the opportunity to show with it the surface of an object, while at the same time leaving its essence to the imagination, were reflected in the two volumes of poetry.

He described Rodin to Lou Andreas-Salomé as a lonely old man, "sunk in himself, standing full of sap like an old tree in autumn." Rodin had given his heart "a depth, and its beat comes from afar as though from a mountain center." For Rilke, Rodin's real discovery was the liberation of surfaces, as well as the seemingly unintentional fashioning of the sculpture from the thus liberated forms. He described how Rodin did not follow a principal concept, but masterfully designed the smallest elements, in accordance with their own development.

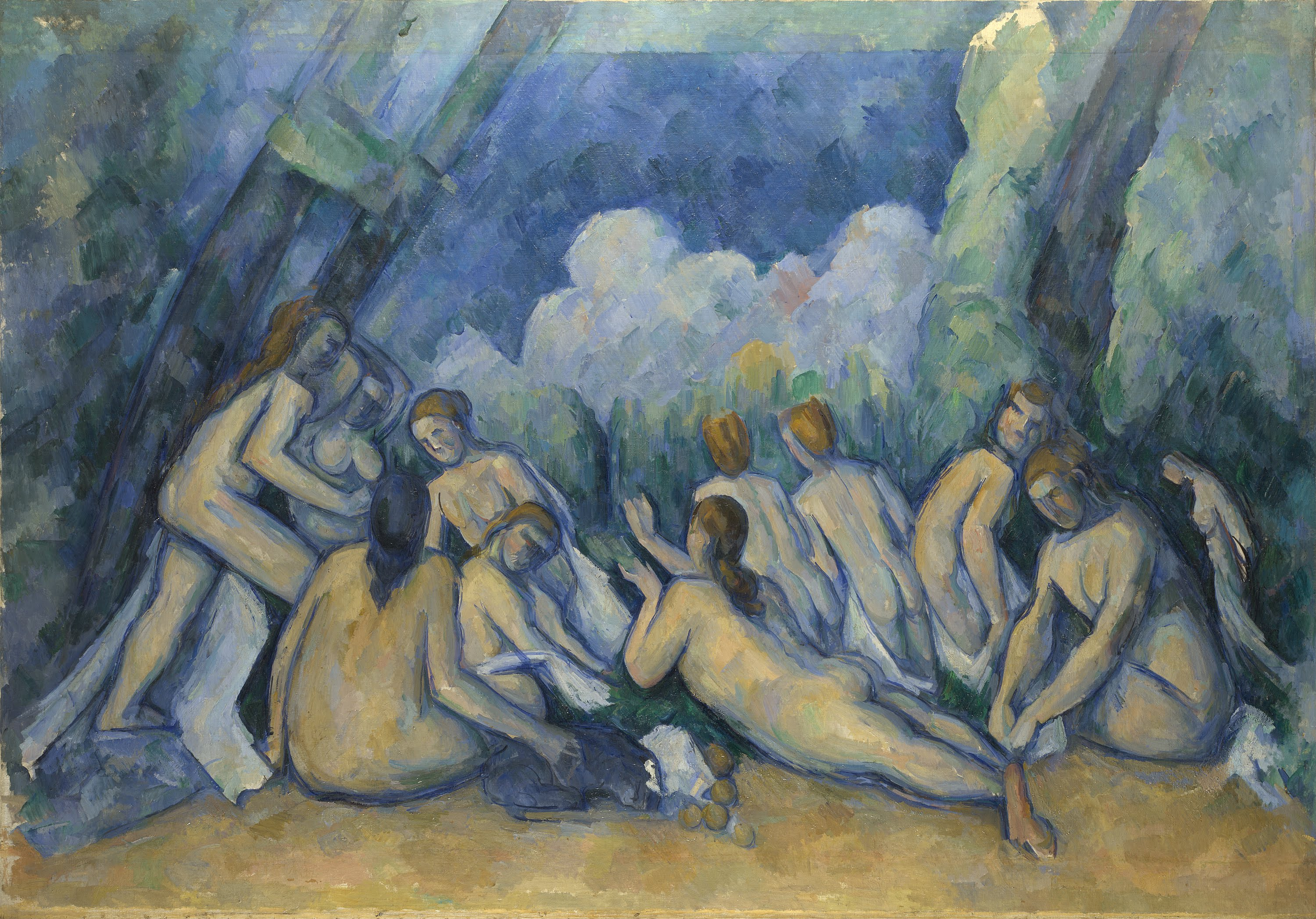
Paul Cézanne's The Bathers. Rilke saw this painting at the Paris retrospective of 1907

While Rodin closed himself to what is unimportant, he was open to reality, where "animals and people... touch him like things". Like a continually receptive lover, nothing escapes him, and as a craftsman he has a concentrated "way of looking." There is nothing "uncertain for him in an object that serves him as a model... The object is definite, the art-object must be even more definite, withdrawn from all chance and removed from all ambiguity, lifted out of time and given to space, it has become permanent, capable of eternity. The model seems, the art-object is."

Just as Rilke had discovered landscape "as the language for his confessions" in Worpswede, and learned the "language of the hands" with Rodin, so did Cézanne lead him into the realm of colors. The special color perception that Rilke developed in France is illustrated in his famous Blaue Hortensie (Blue Hydrangea) sonnet, in which he shows, in an almost detached fashion, the interplay of the appearance of lively colors.

Rilke's turn to the visual is evidence of a low confidence in language and is related to the language crisis of modernity, as exemplified by Hofmannsthal's Chandos letter, in which he addresses the reasons for a profound skepticism about language. Language, according to Rilke, offers "too-rough pliers" to tap into the soul; the word can not be "the outward sign" for "our actual life". As much as he admired Hofmannsthal, Rilke also distinguished between a poetic and metaphorical language of things and a language conceived abstractedly and rationally.

== Special features ==
The New Poems show Rilke's great sensitivity to the world of representational reality. The ascetic thing-aspect of his verse no longer allowed the frank and open discussion of his soul, or the fine emotional and sensual states, presented clearly in The Book of Hours in the shape of prayer.

The poems tend to be stylistically descriptive at the starting point, but the boundary between observer and object soon dissolves via observation and elicits new connections. With this thing-mysticism Rilke did not however want ecstasy to overcome the clarity of consciousness, especially since he frequently made use of the sonnet form, whose caesuras are, however, glossed over by the musical language. In contrast to Eduard Mörike and Conrad Ferdinand Meyer – whose 1882 poem "Der römische Brunnen" is paradigmatic – Rilke wanted objects to not merely describe or objectify moods; the thing should rather be charged, as it were, with a special meaning and thus be released from conventional references to space and time. This is confirmed by the lines of the unrhymed poem The Rose Bowl, which completes the first part: "And the movement in the roses, see: / gestures from such small vibrations, / that they would remain invisible, if their / Rays did not diverge into the universe."

As he described in a brief 1919 published essay, Primal Sound, he wanted to expand the senses by means of art, to return to things their own worth, their "sheer size", and to withdraw the availability of rational purpose for the recipient. He believed in a higher total context of all beings, attainable only through art, which transcends the world: the "perfect poem" could "arise only under the condition that the world, acted upon by five levers simultaneously, appears, under a certain aspect on the supernatural plane, which is precisely the plane of the poem."

== Interpretation and reception ==
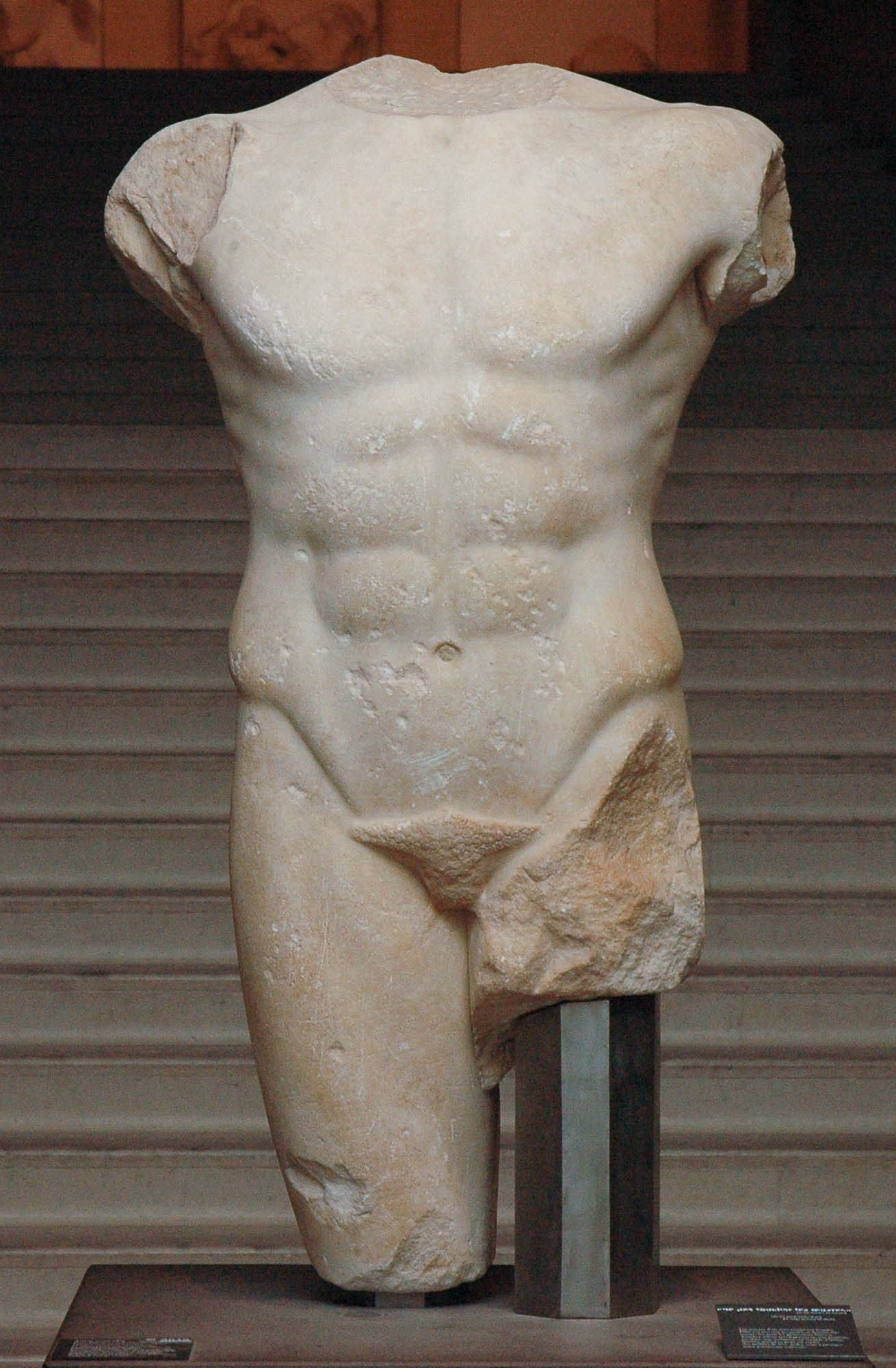
Miletus Torso, 5th-4th centuries BC, Louvre (possible inspiration for 'Archaic Torso of Apollo')

Following research, Rilke's long-neglected collection (compared to his later works, such as the Duino Elegies or the Sonnets to Orpheus), has in the last decades arrived at a re-appraisal. Within his oeuvre, the New Poems were now regarded as his most important contribution to modern literature and were most intensively received. They document his ideal of the Dinggedicht, relating primarily to (external) objects, works of painting, sculpture and architecture, and to animals from the Parisian Jardin des Plantes and landscapes.

In poems such as "The Panther", his most famous work, or "Archaic Torso of Apollo", Rilke approaches this sort of ideal clearly. In this sonnet he converts the object of observation into a transcendent symbol, the observing subject and seeing object embrace: although the torso is missing its head, the entire statue glows from within, beaming towards the observer like a star and leading to an epiphany: "For there is no place / that does not see you. You must change your life."

The New Poems are also subjected to opposing interpretations. One part of scholarship saw in them a reconciling interpretation of human existence or alternatively, like Walther Rehm, pointed out their "icy splendour". "All these things, the fountains and marble wagons, the stairs to the orangery, the courtesan and the alchemist, the beggar and the saint – none profoundly knows the others. They are all non-relational – accidental and hollow, like statues or sculptures, isolated next to each other, in the artfully assembled space of this collection of poems, almost like in a museum."

Since Rilke attended not to the objects as such, but to their representation, it was natural to interpret his poetry phenomenologically. Kate Hamburger indicated such a connection to the philosophy of Edmund Husserl, who himself dealt with this question with his 'Thing and Space' lecture of 1907.

On the occasion of the 150th anniversary of Rilke's birth, Australian poet Geoffrey Lehmann published in 2025 translations of fifty poems from this collection, adding Rilke's untitled last poem, written on his deathbed in 1926, Komm du, du letzter, den ich anerkenne (Come my last visitor. I know your name).
