= Four Orchestral Songs (Schoenberg) =

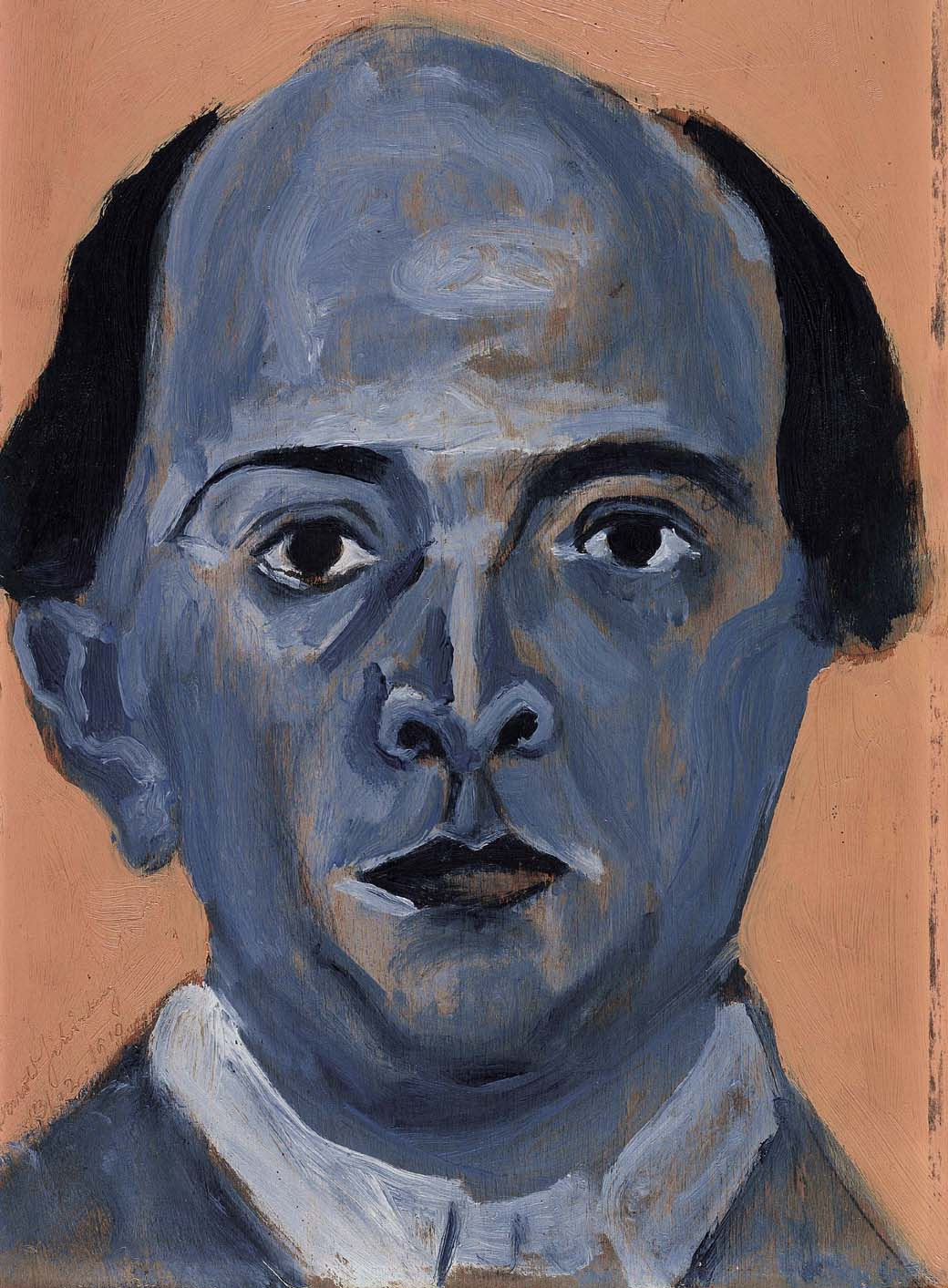
A 1910 self-portrait of Arnold Schoenberg

Four Orchestral Songs, Op. 22 (German: Vier Lieder für Gesang und Orchester or Vier Orchesterlieder), is a composition by Austrian composer Arnold Schoenberg, scored for soprano and large orchestra.

== Composition ==
The songs were composed separately, even though they were published as a set. The first song was finished on 6 October 1913; the second one was composed between 30 November and 3 December 1914; the third one was composed between 3 December 1914, and 1 January 1915; and, after a hiatus, the fourth one was composed between 19 and 28 July 1916. These songs were the last works that Schoenberg was to write in the freely atonal style. After finishing this composition, Schoenberg would complete no new works for seven years, at which point he composed the Five Piano Pieces, Op. 23. During this compositional hiatus, he would develop the twelve-tone technique; thereafter, he would compose mainly (though not exclusively) using the twelve-note method.

The orchestral songs was premiered on 21 February 1932, in Frankfurt am Main, conducted by Hans Rosbaud with soprano Hertha Reinecke. The second movement was dedicated to student and fellow composer Anton Webern. It was eventually published by Universal Edition in Vienna, on 7 November 1917.

== Structure ==
The four songs are as follows:

1. Seraphita
2. Alle, welche dich suchen (All that Seek Thee)
3. Mach mich zum Wächter deiner Weiten (Make me thy Guardian)
4. Vorgefühle (Premonition)

The first of the songs, Seraphita, was composed in October 1913. The text comes from a poem by Ernest Dowson, translated by Stefan George. This is the most extended of the four songs with the vocal line separated by substantial orchestral interludes. The six clarinets open this song with a melody primarily based on seconds and thirds.

The second song was written from November to December 1914, taking a text from a collection of poetry entitled The Book of Hours, by Rainer Maria Rilke; it is found in the second volume, Das Buch von der Pilgerschaft (The Book of Pilgrimage).

The third song, which also comes from Rilke's The Book the Hours, Das Buch von der Armut und vom Tode (The Book of Poverty and Death), was written between December 1914 to January 1915 and is divided into three sections.

The fourth and final song, Vorgefühle, was finished in July 1916 with the text coming from Rilke's The Book of Images.

== Arrangements ==
Felix Greissle wrote an arrangement of the whole set of songs in 1921. It was scored for a small ensemble which included a baritone, a piccolo, a flute, a clarinet, a bass clarinet, a violin, a viola, a violoncello, and a piano. The arrangement has only been recorded once by EMI, which was released in LP format. The performance of this recording was carried out by the Pierrot Ensemble Köln in August 1980.

== Notable recordings ==
The Philharmonia Orchestra recording on the Naxos label with the voice of Catherine Wyn-Rogers under the baton of Robert Craft. At the time of its release in 1998, it received a positive critical reception.
