= List of Duino Elegies translations =

The following is a list of translations of Rainer Marie Rilke's Duino Elegies. They are grouped by language and listed chronologically by date of publication.

== English ==
- Duineser Elegien: Elegies from the Castle of Duino. Translated by Sackville-West, Vita; Sackville-West, Edward. London: Hogarth. 1931. OCLC 1042987052.
- Duino Elegies. Translated by Leishman, James Blair; Spender, Stephen. London: Hogarth. 1939. ISBN 978-0-393-00155-6. OCLC 752755743.
- "Duino Elegies". The Sonnets to Orpheus and Duino Elegies. Translated by Lemont, Jessie. New York: Fine Editions Press. 1945. OCLC 1841711.
- Duineser Elegien. The Elegies of Duino. Translated by Purtscher-Wydenbruck, Nora. Vienna: Amandus. 1948. OCLC 3021388. (Nora Wydenbruck)
- The Duino Elegies. Translated by Behn, Harry. Mount Vernon, N.Y.: Peter Pauper Press. 1957. OCLC 368317.
- Duino Elegies: With English Translations. Translated by MacIntyre, C. F. Berkeley: University of California. 1963. ISBN 978-0-520-01073-4. OCLC 252552087.
- The Duino Elegies. Translated by Garmey, Stephen; Wilson, Jay. New York: Harper & Row. 1972. ISBN 9780060902544. OCLC 241579668.
- Duinesian Elegies. Translated by Boney, Elaine E. Chapel Hill: University of North Carolina Press. 1975. ISBN 9781469657165. OCLC 716325574.
- "Duino Elegies". Duino Elegies and the Sonnets to Orpheus. Translated by Poulin, Alfred A. Jr. Boston: Houghton Mifflin. 1977. pp. 5–82. ISBN 0-395-25015-3. OCLC 1035669414.
- "Duino Elegies". Selected Poetry of Rainer Maria Rilke. Translated by Mitchell, Stephen. New York: Harper & Row. 1981. ISBN 9780060907273. OCLC 606442850.
- Duino Elegies. Translated by Hunter, Robert. Eugene: Hulogos'i. 1987. ISBN 9780938493044. OCLC 15223985.
- Duino Elegies: A Bilingual Edition. Translated by Cohn, Stephen. Evanston, Illinois: Northwestern University Press. 1989. ISBN 9780810116481. OCLC 984915476.
- The Duino Elegies. Translated by Hammer, Louis; Jaeger, Sharon Ann. Old Chatham, N.Y.: Sachem Press. 1991. ISBN 9780937584156. OCLC 23733818.
- Duino Elegies. Translated by Young, David. New York: W.W. Norton. 1992. ISBN 9780393309317. OCLC 30025969.
- The Duino Elegies. Translated by Norris, Leslie; Keele, Alan. Rochester, N.Y.: Camden House. 1993. ISBN 9781571133915. OCLC 495254222.
- Duino Elegies: A Bilingual Edition. Translated by Bridgewater, Patrick. London: Menard Press. 1999. ISBN 9781874320265. OCLC 722941292.
- "The Duino Elegies of Rainer Maria Rilke". Reading Rilke: Reflections on the Problems of Translation. Translated by Gass, William H. New York: A. A. Knopf. 1999. ISBN 9781564789129. OCLC 1151099648.
- "Duino Elegies (1923)". The Essential Rilke. Translated by Kinnell, Galway; Liebmann, Hannah. Hopewell, N.J.: Ecco Press. 1999. pp. 77–148. ISBN 0-88001-676-0. OCLC 1034659970.
- Duino Elegies: Bilingual Edition. Translated by Snow, Edward. New York: North Point Press. 2000. ISBN 9780865475465.
- The Duino Elegies. Translated by Waterfield, John. Lewiston: The Edwin Mellen Press. 2000. ISBN 9780773478893. OCLC 505046830.
- Duino Elegies. Translated by Crucefix, Martyn. London: Enitharmon. 2008. ISBN 9781904634232. OCLC 712358841.
- "Duino Elegies". Rainer Maria Rilke: Selected Poems with Parallel German Text. Translated by Ranson, Susan; Sutherland, Marielle. New York: Oxford University Press. 2011. pp. 130–181. ISBN 9780199569410. OCLC 671709704.
- Duino Elegies: Bilingual English-German Edition. Translated by Oswald, David. Einsiedeln, Switzerland: Daimon Verlag. 2012. ISBN 9783856307479. OCLC 858435392.
- Duino Elegies. Translated by Miranda, Gary. Portland, Oregon: Tavern Books. 2013. ISBN 9781935635321. OCLC 865181020.
- "Duino Elegies". Rilke's Late Poetry: Duino Elegies, The Sonnets to Orpheus, Selected Last Poems. Translated by Good, Graham. Vancouver: Ronsdale. 2015. ISBN 9781553800248. OCLC 1152936079.
- "The Duino Elegies". The Poetry of Rainer Maria Rilke. Translated by Kline, A. S. Poetry in Translation. 2015. ISBN 9781512129465.
- "Duino Elegies". Being Here is Glorious: On Rilke, Poetry, and Philosophy with a New Translation of the Duino Elegies. Translated by Reid, James D. Evanston, Illinois: Northwestern University Press. 2015. ISBN 9780199569410. OCLC 961807367.
- "Duino Elegies (1912–1922)". The Rilke of Ruth Speirs: New Poems, Duino elegies, Sonnets to Orpheus & Others. Translated by Speirs, Ruth. Reading: Two Rivers Press. 2015. ISBN 9781909747128. OCLC 929025069.
- Duino Elegies: A New and Complete Translation. Translated by Corn, Alfred. New York: W. W. Norton. 2021. ISBN 9781324005407. OCLC 1249107613.
- Duino Elegies. Translated by Croggon, Alison. Melbourne: Newport Street Books. 2022. ISBN 9780648874430. OCLC 1312727462.
- Duino Elegies: A New Translation and Commentary. Translated by Travers, Martin. Rochester: Boydell & Brewer. 2023. ISBN 9781640140981. OCLC 1369656958.

== Afrikaans ==
- Duino-Elegieë (in Afrikaans). Translated by Pieterse, Henning J. Pretoria: Protea Boekhuis. 2007. ISBN 9781869191511.

== Catalan ==
- Elegies de Duino (in Catalan). Translated by Fulquet, Josep Maria; Santiago, Eduard. Barcelona: Flâneur. 2020. ISBN 978-84-09-21295-8. OCLC 1249550024.

== Chinese ==
- "Dù yī nuò wǎngē 杜伊诺挽歌 [Duino Elegies]". Āigē yǔ shísì háng shī: Lǐ ěr kè shī xuǎn 哀歌与十四行诗 : 里尔克诗选 [Lamentations and Sonnets: Selected Poems by Rilke] (in Chinese). Translated by Zhang, Deming 维基百科. Jinan: Shāndōng wényì chūbǎn shè 山东文艺出版社 [Shandong Literature and Art Publishing House]. 2017. ISBN 978-7-5329-5559-6. OCLC 1096338614.

== Czech ==
- Elegie z Duina; Sonety Orfeovi (in Czech). Translated by Suchomel, Milan. Červený Kostelec: Pavel Mervart. 2017. ISBN 978-80-7465-257-8. OCLC 1015193719.

== Dutch ==
- De elegieën van Duino : 1912/1922 (in Dutch). Translated by Bronzwaer, W. Baarn: Ambo. 1978. ISBN 90-263-0405-6. OCLC 781100126.
- De elegieën van Duino (in Dutch). Translated by Wieren, Atze van. Utrecht: Uitgeverij IJzer. 2006. ISBN 90-74328-98-9. OCLC 150275689.

== French ==
- Elégies de Duino; Les Sonnets à Orphée (in French). Translated by Lewinter, Roger. Paris: G. Lebovici. 1989. ISBN 2-85184-223-4. OCLC 461989583.
- Les élégies de Duino = Duineser Elegien; Les sonnets à Orphée = Die Sonette an Orpheus (in French). Translated by Angelloz, Joseph François. Paris: Flammarion. 1992. ISBN 2-08-070674-8. OCLC 708379594.
- Élégies de Duino (in French). Translated by Biemel, Rainier. Paris: Éditions Allia. 2015. ISBN 978-2-84485-983-9. OCLC 906294977.

== Hebrew ==
- מבחר שירים : הסונטים אל אורפאוס, רקוויאם לידידה, אלגיות דואינו [Selected Poems: The Sonnets to Orpheus, Requiem for a Friend, Duino Elegies] (in Hebrew). Translated by Klei, Hanoch. Tel Aviv. 1985. OCLC 232699519.
- Elegyot duʼino, ha-Soneṭim shel Orfeʼus אלגיות דואינו, הסונטים אל אורפאוס [Duino Elegies, The Sonnets to Orpheus] (in Hebrew). Translated by Brodsky, Ada. Jerusalem: Karmel. 1998. ISBN 9789654071901.
- Elegyot duʼino אלגיות דואינ [Duino Elegies] (in Hebrew). Translated by Zandbank, Shimon. Tel Aviv. 1999. OCLC 233193861.

== Hungarian ==
- Duineser Elegien Duinói elégiák (in Hungarian). Translated by Léderer Vera, Pintérné; György, Pintér Gábor. Budapest: Argumentum. 2003. ISBN 963-446-261-8. OCLC 1087888391.

== Italian ==
- Elegie duinesi (in Italian). Translated by Giavotto Künkler, Anna Lucia. Genova: Il melangolo. 1985. ISBN 88-7018-066-2. OCLC 879110533.

== Japanese ==
- Duino Elegies (ドゥイノの悲歌, Do~uino no hika) (in Japanese). Translated by Tezuka, Tomio 富雄手塚. Tokyo: Iwanami Books (岩波書店, Iwanami Shoten). 2010 [1957]. ISBN 978-40-03243-23-7. OCLC 674536750.

== Portuguese ==
- As Elegias De Duíno (in Portuguese). Translated by Dias Furtado, Maria Theresa. Assírio & Alvim. 2020. ISBN 978-972-37-2133-1.

== Russian ==
- Duinskie elegii Дуинские элегии [Duino Elegies] (PDF) (in Russian). Translated by Mikushevich, Vladimir Borisovich. ImWerdenVerlag. 2002.
- Duinskie elegii Дуинские элегии [Duino Elegies] (in Russian). Translated by Tarzayeva, Vera. AATRONIK. 2011. ISBN 9785904547127.
- Duinskie elegii Дуинские элегии [Duino Elegies] (in Russian). Translated by Boldyrevdyrev, Nikolaj Fedorovich. Водолей [Vodolej]. 2017. ISBN 9785917633411.

== Spanish ==
- Elegías de Duino; Los sonetos a Orfeo (in Spanish). Translated by Barjau, Eustaquio. Madrid: Cátedra. 1987. ISBN 84-376-0687-X. OCLC 434081390.
- Elegías de Duino = Duineser Elegien (in Spanish). Translated by Rulfo, Juan. Madrid: Sexto Piso. 2015. ISBN 978-84-16358-23-6. OCLC 927805221.
- Elegías de Duino. Nueva edición con poemas y cartas inéditos (in Spanish). Translated by Jaume, Andreu; Kovacsics, Adan. Lumen. 2023. ISBN 978-84-26424-35-8.

== Swedish ==
- Duinoelegierna. Translated by Lindegren, Erik. Stockholm: Bonnier. 1998. ISBN 91-0-056810-4. OCLC 185785649.

== Turkish ==
- Duino Ağıtları (in Turkish and German). Translated by Alkor, Can. Istanbul: Türkiye İş Bankası Kültür Yayınları. 2006. ISBN 9789754587241. OCLC 850807582.
- Duino Ağıtları (in Turkish and German). Translated by Yılmazer Aksu, Zehra. Istanbul: Türkiye İş Bankası Kültür Yayınları. 2017. ISBN 9786052950258. OCLC 1018218900.
- Duino Ağıtları (in Turkish). Translated by Kaya, Süheyla. Istanbul: Ayrıntı Yayınları. 2019. ISBN 9786053143253.
