= Alfred Poulin =

American poet, translator, and editor

Alfred A. Poulin Jr. or A. Poulin (1938–1996) was an American poet, translator, and editor noted for his translation of Rainer Maria Rilke's Duino Elegies and the Sonnets to Orpheus. Poulin studied at St. Francis College in Maine, Loyola University in Chicago, Illinois, and at the University of Iowa Writers' Workshop. He later taught as a professor at the State University of New York at Brockport. His translation work focused on translating poetry from French and German into English.

== Works ==
=== Poetry ===
- 1978: The Nameless Garden
- 1987: Momentary Order
- 1991: Cave Dwellers: Poems
- 2001: Selected Poems (posthumous)

=== Translations ===
- 1994: Hébert, Anne. Day Has No Equal But Night (Rochester, NY: BOA Editions). ISBN 978-1880238059
- 1988: Hébert, Anne. Selected Poems. Translated by A. Poulin Jr.. (Toronto: Stoddart, 1988). ISBN 0-7737-5174-2
- 1975: Rilke, Rainer Maria. Duino Elegies and The Sonnets To Orpheus translated by Alfred Poulin Jr. (Boston: Houghton Mifflin Company). ISBN 0-395-25058-7
