= Dinggedicht =

Poetic form

Dinggedicht (orig. German: literally, 'poem of things' or 'thing poem'; plural, Dinggedichte) is a poetic form, referring to a specific focus and mood in the choice of a poetic theme.

Developed during the second half of the 19th century, the focus in a Dinggedicht rests on an animate or inanimate object that is described in a distanced, often dissociated and objectified way. The poet aims at finding the language that is specific and supposedly indigenous to the thing in view. The poet attempts to let the very object itself speak in its own language. It is supposed to express the inner being of the object in focus. In this tradition, objects from the arts have often been taken up, but more recently poets have also sought out objects from every-day life. Furthermore, the Dinggedicht need not necessarily aim at a physical object, but also recapture abstract notions in an objectified fashion. The voice in the Dinggedicht is frequently the third person.

The poetological technical term was coined by the German literary scholar Kurt Oppert.

== Notable Dinggedicht poets or poems ==
- Eduard Mörike (e.g., Auf eine Lampe)
- Conrad Ferdinand Meyer (e.g., Der römische Brunnen)
- Rainer Maria Rilke (e.g., Archaïscher Torso Apollos, Der Panther, Das Karussell)
- Paul-Henri Campbell (e.g., The Spacewalk Sutra)
