= Gary Miranda =

American poet (born 1939)

- Born: Bremerton, Washington, United States
- Occupations: Poet, screenwriter

Gary Miranda (born 1939 in Bremerton, Washington) is an American poet.

== Life ==
Miranda was raised in the Pacific Northwest. He spent six years in a Jesuit seminary, then did graduate work at San Jose State College and the University of California, Irvine. He has published poems in numerous magazines, including The New Yorker, The Atlantic Monthly, Poetry, The American Poetry Review, and elsewhere.

His 1978 collection Listeners at the Breathing Place was nominated for the Pulitzer Prize. He has won nine awards from the Poetry Society of America, and in July 1979, Miranda was chosen by the editors of the Atlantic Monthly to be the third poet-in-residence at The Frost Place, Robert Frost's house in Franconia, New Hampshire, after Katha Pollitt and Robert Hass. From 1970 to 1973, he was a Fulbright Lecturer at the University of Athens in Greece He has taught writing and literature at various colleges and universities, most recently as writer-in-residence at Reed College in Portland, Oregon.

== Reviews and criticism ==
Miranda's poetry has been well received. His first collection, Listeners at the Breathing Place, chosen for the Princeton Series of Contemporary Poets, was described as "inviting and impressive" in the Library Journal Maxine Kumin called it "a first book to be proud of," and Miranda "a versatile and sensitive poet." Writing in Poetry, Michael Heffernan called the book "breathtaking."

The Library Journal review of Miranda's second collection, Grace Period, said it was "written with a sure hand," and that Miranda "bears witness" and "surprises us." In a review of Orpheus and Company: Contemporary Poems on Greek Mythology, edited by Deborah DeNicola, David Garza calls the opening to Miranda's poem on Narcissus "insightful and seductive."

Miranda's translation of Rilke's Duino Elegies received wide praise. Robin Skelton, in The Malahat Review, said it "retains the brilliance of the original;" Robert Boyers, in Salmagundi, said, "Nowhere does it read like a translation." Rilke Scholar John Mood called it "the nearest to a definitive Elegies we're apt ever to get in the English language." Jan Freeman, director of Paris Press, said, "No other translation compares to this one." Less effusive, the review in the Virginia Quarterly Review called the translation "admirable," "clear and readable," and "faithful" to Rilke's meaning, but found Miranda's translation "prosaic," and prefers the translation by Harry Behn.

Miranda has not been identified strongly with a single school of poetry; although three of his poems were included in the New Formalist collection Strong Measures, he does not limit himself to traditional forms - in fact, most of his work is free verse.

== Selected works ==
=== Poetry collections ===
- Turning Sixty, Zoland Books, 2003
- Grace Period, Princeton University Press, 1983.
- Duino Elegies, by Rainer Maria Rilke, Azul, 1996. Tavern Books, 2013.
- Listeners at the Breathing Place, Princeton University Press, 1979.
- The Seed That Dies: Twelve Elegies, Kedros Press (Athens, Greece), 1973.

=== Prose books ===
- Splendid Audacity: The Story of Pacific University, 2000.
- Following A River: Portland's Congregation Neveh Shalom, 1869-1989. Jewish Historical Society of Oregon, 1989.
- Health Care Research in an HMO: Two Decades of Discovery. Johns Hopkins University Press, 1988. (Editor-in-chief)
- A Heaven in the Eye, by Clyde Rice, editor. Breitenbush Books, 1984. Winner, Western States Book Award, judged by Robert Penn Warren.
