= The Book of Images =

Collection of poetry by Rainer Maria Rilke

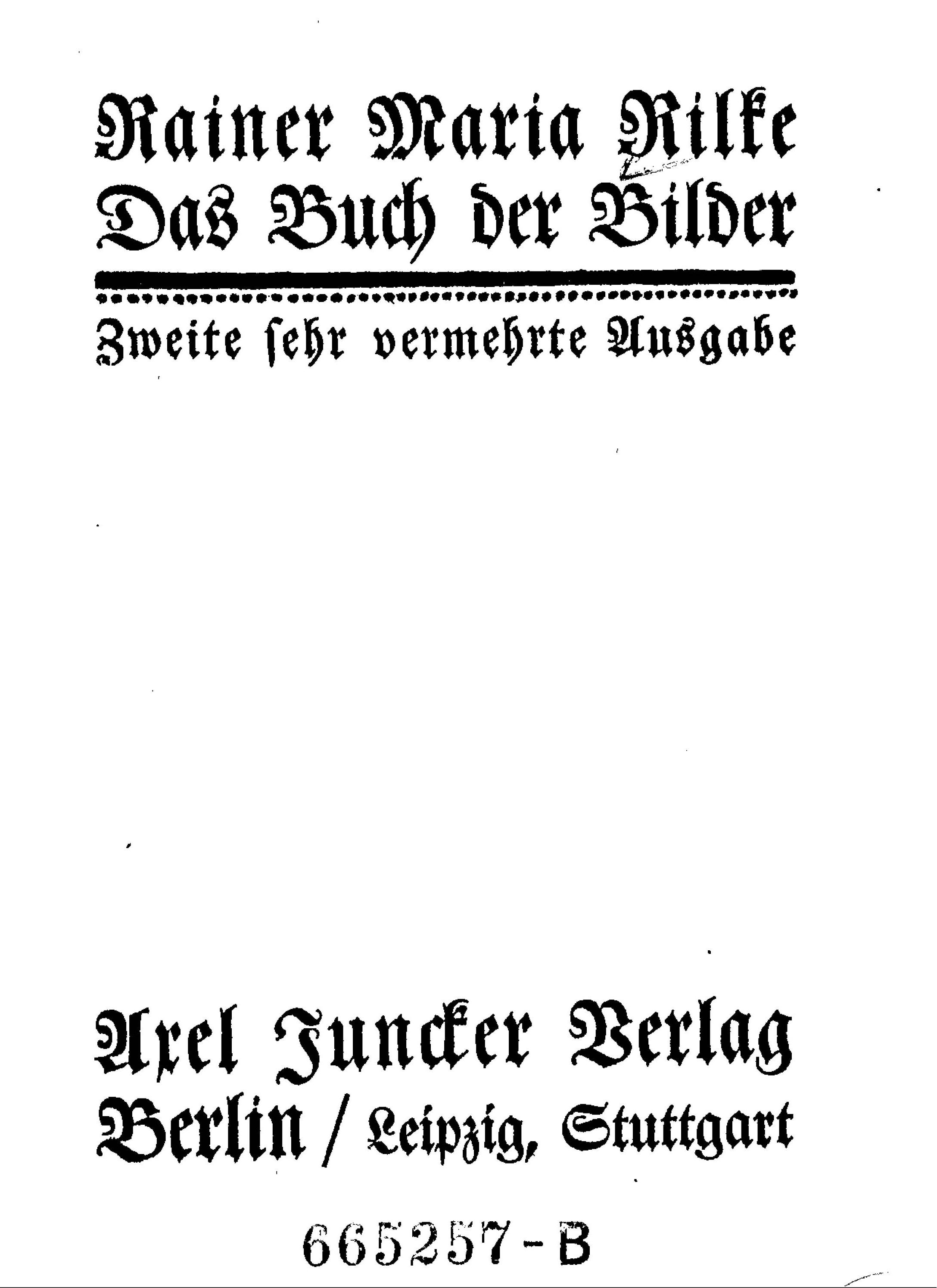
The title page from the 1906 edition of Rilke's The Book of Images (Das Buch der Bilder).

The Book of Images (German: Das Buch der Bilder) is a collection of poetry by the Bohemian-Austrian poet and novelist Rainer Maria Rilke (1875-1926). It was first published in 1902 by Axel Juncker Verlag.

It consists of individual poems written from 1899 and forward. An extended version was published in 1906, after Rilke had written The Book of Hours, with which scholars link The Book of Images as a phase in the poet's writing.

== See also ==
- 1902 in poetry
- Austrian literature
