= Archaic Torso of Apollo =

Poem by Rainer Maria Rilke

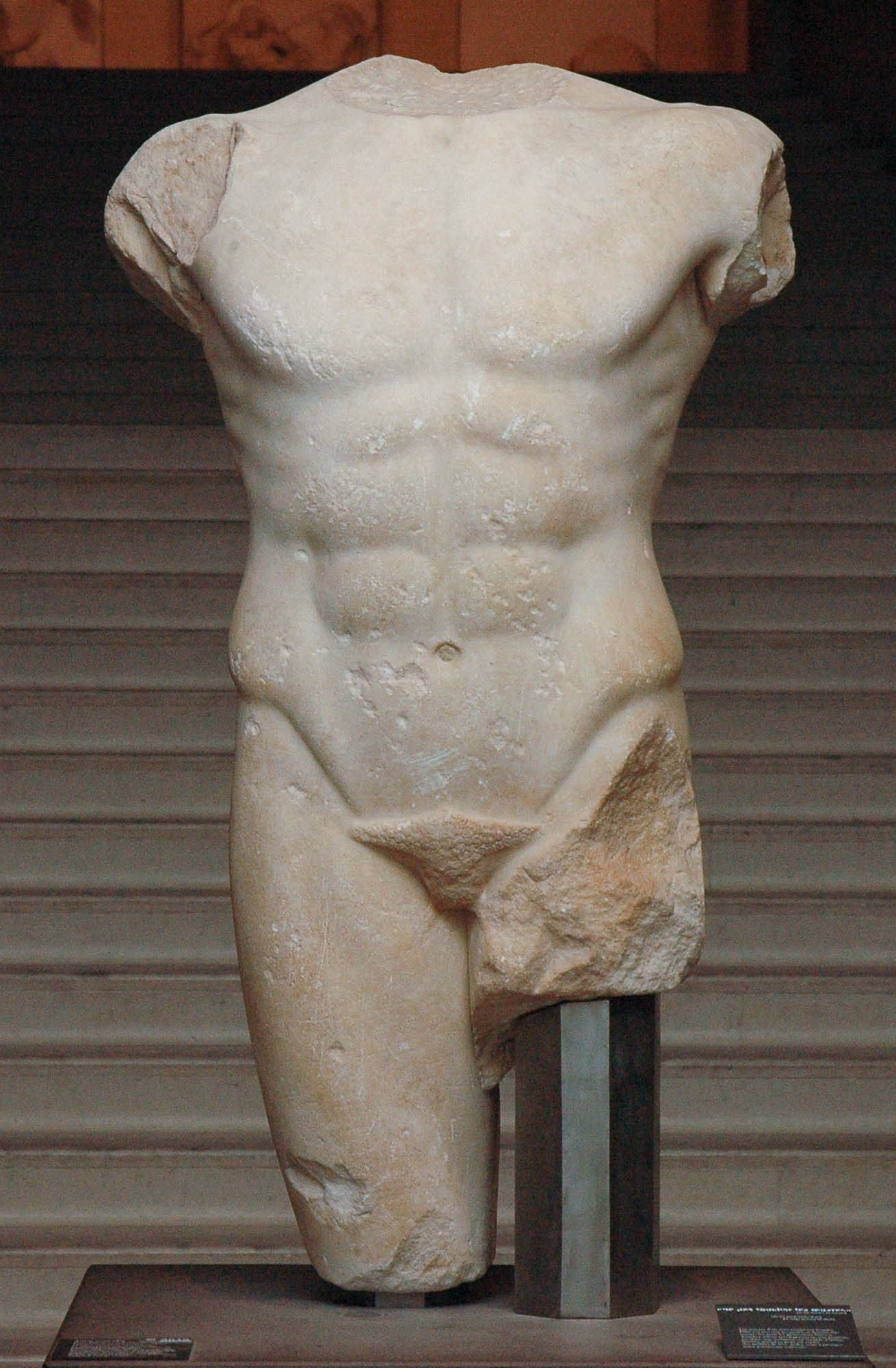
The Miletus torso (c. 480–470 BC) at the Louvre has been suggested as the poem's subject.

"Archaic Torso of Apollo" (German: Archäischer Torso Apollos) is a sonnet by the Austrian writer Rainer Maria Rilke, published in the collection New Poems in 1908. It opens the collection's second part and is a companion piece to "Early Apollo", which opens the first part. The poem describes the impressions given by the surviving torso of an archaic statue, which for the poet creates a vision of what the intact statue must have been like.

== Text ==
The text in German is as follows:

Wir kannten nicht sein unerhörtes Haupt,
darin die Augenäpfel reiften. Aber
sein Torso glüht noch wie ein Kandelaber,
in dem sein Schauen, nur zurückgeschraubt,

sich hält und glänzt. Sonst könnte nicht der Bug
der Brust dich blenden, und im leisen Drehen
der Lenden könnte nicht ein Lächeln gehen
zu jener Mitte, die die Zeugung trug.

Sonst stünde dieser Stein entstellt und kurz
unter der Schultern durchsichtigem Sturz
und flimmerte nicht so wie Raubtierfelle;

und bräche nicht aus allen seinen Rändern
aus wie ein Stern: denn da ist keine Stelle,
die dich nicht sieht. Du mußt dein Leben ändern.

An English translationis as follows:

We cannot know his legendary head
with eyes like ripening fruit. And yet his torso
is still suffused with brilliance from inside,
like a lamp, in which his gaze, now turned to low,

gleams in all its power. Otherwise
the curved breast could not dazzle you so, nor could
a smile run through the placid hips and thighs
to that dark center where procreation flared.

Otherwise this stone would seem defaced
beneath the translucent cascade of the shoulders
and would not glisten like a wild beast’s fur:

would not, from all the borders of itself,
burst like a star: for here there is no place
that does not see you. You must change your life.

== Summary ==
"Archaic Torso of Apollo" is a sonnet with the rhyme scheme AbbA CddC EEf GfG. It is an ekphrasis—a rhetorical genre from ancient Greece that describes inanimate objects—of an archaic Greek sculpture of Apollo, of which only the torso and crotch area survive. The poem argues that although the head is missing, the characteristics of the remaining body give an impression of what the complete statue must have been like. The impression creates a sense of being observed and a need to change one's own life.

== Publication ==
Rainer Maria Rilke's poetry collection New Poems was published in two parts in 1907 and 1908. The first part opens with "Early Apollo" (German: Früher Apollo) and the second with "Archaic Torso of Apollo". Other English titles include "Torso of an Archaic Apollo" and "Apollo's Archaic Torso".

== Analysis and reception ==
Rilke had discussed the relationship between the fragment and the whole in prose texts, notably in reference to the sculptures of Auguste Rodin, writing that "Rodin knows that the body consists of so many stages for the display of life...and he has the power to bestow on any part..the independence and completeness of a whole". Part two of New Poems contains a dedication to Rodin, right before "Archaic Torso of Apollo", and the poem has been interpreted as a tribute to Rodin.

"Early Apollo" and "Archaic Torso of Apollo" function as companion pieces through their roles as opening poems, descriptions of Apollo statues and thematic similarities. The scholar Charlie Louth writes that their respective adjectives are complementary, where "early" becomes a promise about the poetry that will follow, and "archaic" refers to a restoration of something original and complete, which Louth writes that the poem achieves despite the fragmentary state of the statue that inspired it. According to Louth, "Early Apollo" creates anticipation and "Archaic Torso of Apollo" demands that the reader contributes to a new beginning that can match the poem's achievement of fullness, as expressed in its final sentence: "you must change your life".

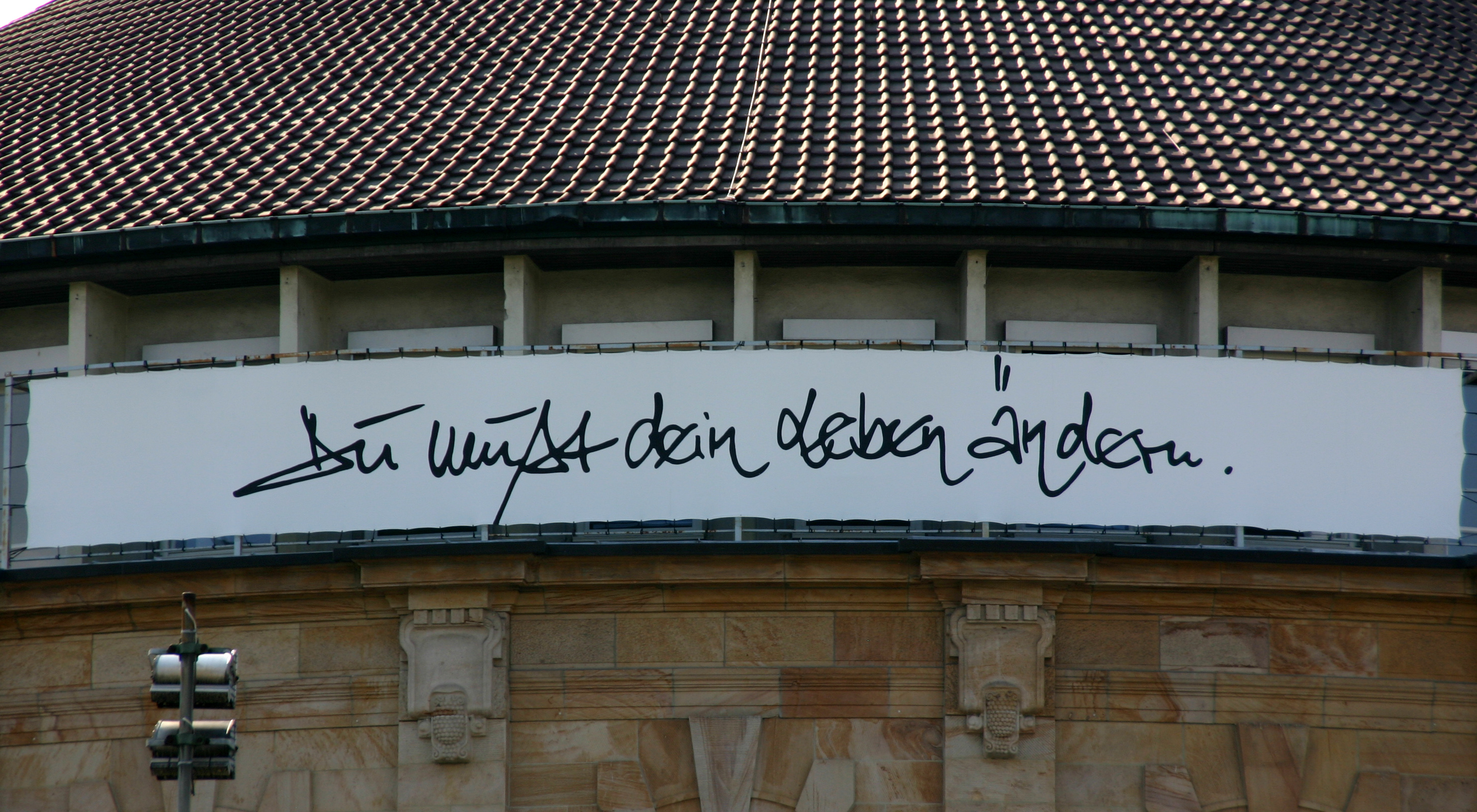
Du mußt dein Leben ändern (you must change your life) on a banner at the Theater Freiburg in 2009

The philosopher Peter Sloterdijk used the final line of "Archaic Torso of Apollo" in the title of his book You Must Change Your Life, published in 2009. According to Sloterdijk, the line expresses the "absolute imperative—the quintessential metanoetic command".

It is not known for certain what statue Rilke thought of when he wrote "Archaic Torso of Apollo". The archaeologist Ulrich Hausmann argued in 1947 that the poem's subject was the Miletus torso (c. 480–470 BC), a sculpture of a young man at the Louvre. The literary scholar Paul Böckmann argued that this is improbable and suggested other possibilities.
