= The Book of Hours =

Collection of poetry by Rainer Maria Rilke

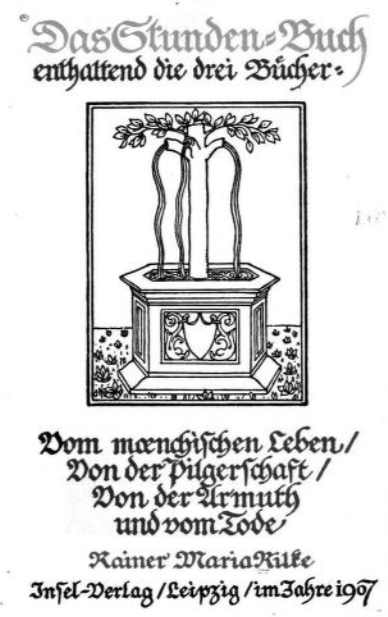
- Author: Rainer Maria Rilke
- Original title: Das Stunden-Buch
- Language: German
- Genre: Poetry
- Publisher: Insel-Verlag
- Publication date: 1905
- Original text: Das Stunden-Buch at German Wikisource
- Translation: The Book of Hours at Wikisource

The Book of Hours (German: Das Stunden-Buch) is a collection of poetry by the Bohemian-Austrian poet and novelist Rainer Maria Rilke (1875–1926). The collection was written between 1899 and 1903 in three parts, and first published in Leipzig by Insel Verlag in April 1905. With its dreamy, melodic expression and neo-Romantic mood, it stands, along with The Lay of the Love and Death of Christoph Cornet, as the most important of his early works.

The work, dedicated to Lou Andreas-Salome, is his first through-composed cycle, which established his reputation as a religious poet, culminating in the poet's Duino Elegies. In provocative language, using a turn-of-the-century Art Nouveau aesthetic, Rilke displayed a wide range of his poetic talent. The suggestive musicality of his verses developed into the hallmark of his later lyric poetry, to mixed criticism.

The Book of Hours consists of three sections with common themes relating to St. Francis and the Christian search for God. The sections are as follows:

- The Book of Monastic Life (Das Buch vom mönchischen Leben)
- The Book of Pilgrimage (Das Buch von der Pilgerschaft)
- The Book of Poverty and Death (Das Buch von der Armut und vom Tode)

One of Rilke's translators, Edward Snow, said the work "is one of the strongest inaugural works in all of modern poetry. It arrives as if out of nowhere and seems to want to wipe the slate clean."

== Composition ==
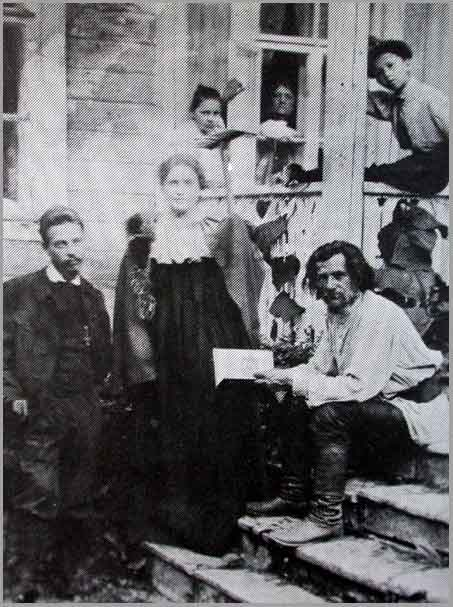
Lou Andreas-Salome and Rilke in Russia, 1900

The first book, The Book of Monastic Life, initially titled "The Prayers" (Die Gebete), was written between 20 September and 14 October 1899 in Berlin-Schmargendorf, where Rilke had also composed The Lay of the Love and Death of Christoph Cornet. The middle part of the cycle was written (after his marriage to Clara Westhoff but before the birth of his daughter) from 18 to 25 September 1901 in Westerwede. The last book was composed from 13 to 20 April 1903 in Viareggio, Italy.

Two years later, now in Worpswede, he revised the text, which was then published in December 1905 - his first collaboration with Insel-Verlag. This introductory book would continue to be published throughout his lifetime, requiring four editions for a total of approximately 60,000 copies.

Rilke's journeys to Russia in the summer of 1899 and 1900 form the biographical background to the work. He undertook these with the dedicatee Lou Andreas-Salome, and began work on the cycle after their conclusion. The vastness of Russia, the fervent devotion of its peasantry to their Orthodox religion, and its culture, little touched by Western civilization - all formed a backdrop that, deepened by personal encounters with Leonid Pasternak and the renowned Leo Tolstoy, became Rilke's spiritual home. Twenty years later, he recalled that the country had revealed to him at this time "the brotherhood and the darkness of God". In this dark remoteness would Rilke continue to "build" on this ancient and eternal God:

On the Volga, on this restfully rolling ocean... one learns all dimensions anew. One discovers: land is huge, water is something huge, and above all the sky is huge. What I have seen until now was no more than an image of land and river and world. Here, however, everything is itself. - I feel as if I had been witness to the creation; a few words for all existences, the things in the measure of God the father...

— Rainer Maria Rilke, The Schmagendorf Diary, September 1, 1900

According to Wolfgang Braungart the sentimental journeys brought Rilke closer to the supposed social success of primordial pre-moderns. He found a "human fraternal compatibility" in a rural-centred world. In this way was the religion of the country conveyed to him, expressed via the prototypical Russian icon or iconostasis.

Rilke shared the cultural practice of idealising Russia with intellectuals such as Thomas Mann and Oswald Spengler. These conservatives were influenced by the fading myth created by Friedrich Nietzsche, the literary testimony of which was to be found in Dostoevsky.

Rilke himself claimed poetic inspiration for the origin of the verses, something which was to characterise his work later. Waking in the morning, or in the evening, he had received words like divinations he needed only to transcribe afterwards.

== Title and background ==
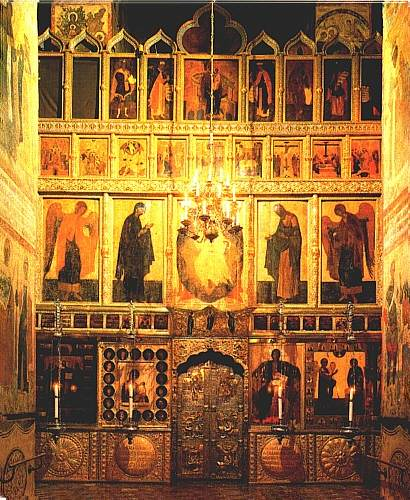
Rilke's imagery of walls and devotional pictures finds its inspiration in the typical Russian Orthodox Iconostasis

The collective title comes from the book of hours, a type of illuminated breviary popular in France in the later Middle Ages. These prayer and worship books were often decorated with illumination and so combined religious edification with art. They contained prayers for different times of the day and were designed to structure the day through regular devotion to God.

The work is influenced by Friedrich Nietzsche and contemporaneous philosophical ideas and shows Rilke's search for a meaningful basis for living, which he identifies as a pantheistic God. He found such a God "in all these things / in which I am good and like a brother" and addressed him as "neighbour God" in which he "sometimes / in a long night with a loud knock disturbs", and with whom he is only separated by "a thin wall".

Rilke transcribes an unfinished dialogue between self and God that renders attempts to define God impossible; not only has the lyrical self been dissociated, but also the "interlocutor" in different forms is invoked, sometimes appearing as the "darkest" as sometimes as "the prince of the Land of Light."

In addition to the self-searching and self-discovery, the God-dialog also reveals problems of linguistic expression. Admittedly one does not find in his Book of Hours any fundamental skepticism about language, such as Hugo von Hofmannsthal articulated in his Chandos letter. But rather, Rilke demonstrates the problem of capturing the nature of the self and of God linguistically. Before him, people build pictures "... like walls; so that already a thousand walls stand around you. / Because you cover up our pious hands, / whenever you see our open hearts."

For critic Meinhard Prill, Rilke's is a "becoming God", one that although conceivable as the source of meaning and purpose in the world remains ultimately ineffable.

== Form and lyrical diversity ==
The provisional nature of religious poetic speech corresponds to the form of the collection, with its loosely arranged poems, the scope of which are very different. Rilke played with a wide variety of verse forms and used numerous virtuoso lyrical means at his disposal: enjambment and internal rhyme, suggestive imagery, forced rhyme and rhythm, alliteration and assonance. Other distinctive characteristics include the popular, often polysyndetic conjunction "and" as well as frequent nominalization, which is sometimes regarded as mannerist.

== See also ==
- 1905 in poetry
