= Sonnets to Orpheus =

Sonnet cycle by Rainer Maria Rilke

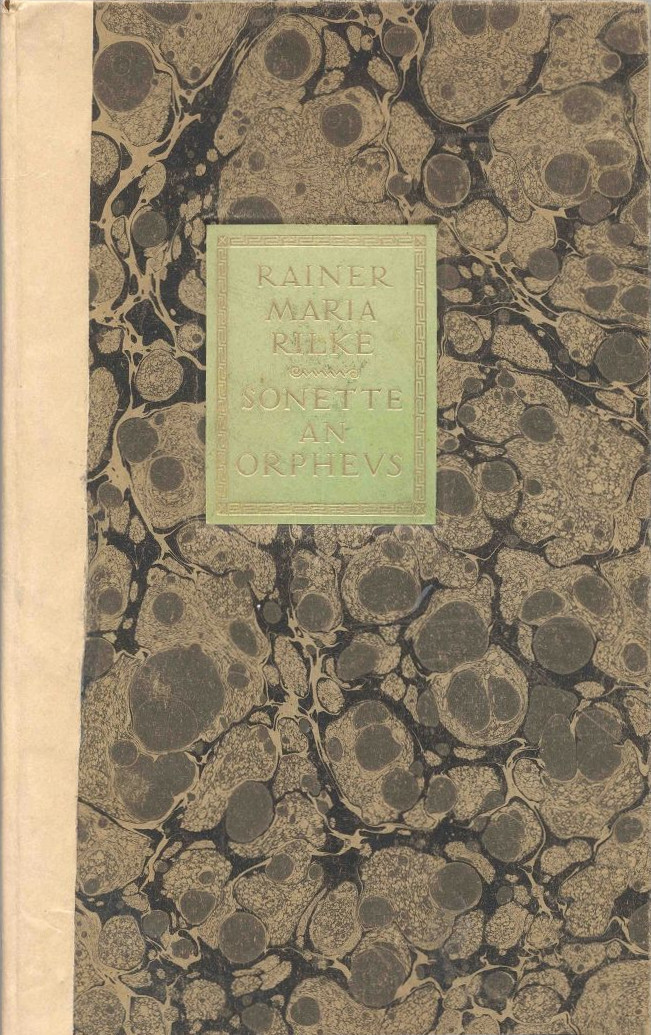
- Front cover of Rilke's Sonnets to Orpheus, 1923
- Author: Rainer Maria Rilke
- Original title: Die Sonette an Orpheus
- Language: German
- Genre: Poetry
- Publisher: Insel-Verlag
- Publication date: 1923
- Original text: Die Sonette an Orpheus at German Wikisource

The Sonnets to Orpheus (German: Die Sonette an Orpheus) are a cycle of 55 sonnets written in 1922 by the Bohemian-Austrian poet Rainer Maria Rilke (1875–1926). It was first published the following year. Rilke, who is "widely recognized as one of the most lyrically intense German-language poets," wrote the cycle in a period of three weeks experiencing what he described a "savage creative storm." Inspired by the news of the death of Wera Ouckama Knoop (1900–1919), a playmate of Rilke's daughter Ruth, he dedicated them as a memorial, or Grab-Mal (literally "grave-marker"), to her memory.

At the same time in February 1922, Rilke had completed work on his deeply philosophical and mystical ten-poem collection entitled Duino Elegies which had taken ten years to complete. The Sonnets to Orpheus and the Duino Elegies are considered Rilke's masterpieces and the highest expressions of his talent.

== Writing and publication history ==
=== Château de Muzot and the "savage creative storm" ===
Through most of the 1910s, Rilke had suffered from a severe depression that had kept him from writing. He had begun his Duino Elegies in 1912, and completed parts of it in 1913 and 1915 before being rendered silent by a psychological crisis caused by the events of World War I and his brief conscription into the Austro-Hungarian army. Only in 1920 was he motivated to focus toward completing the Elegies. However, for the next two years, his mode of life was unstable and did not permit him the time or mental state he needed for his writing.

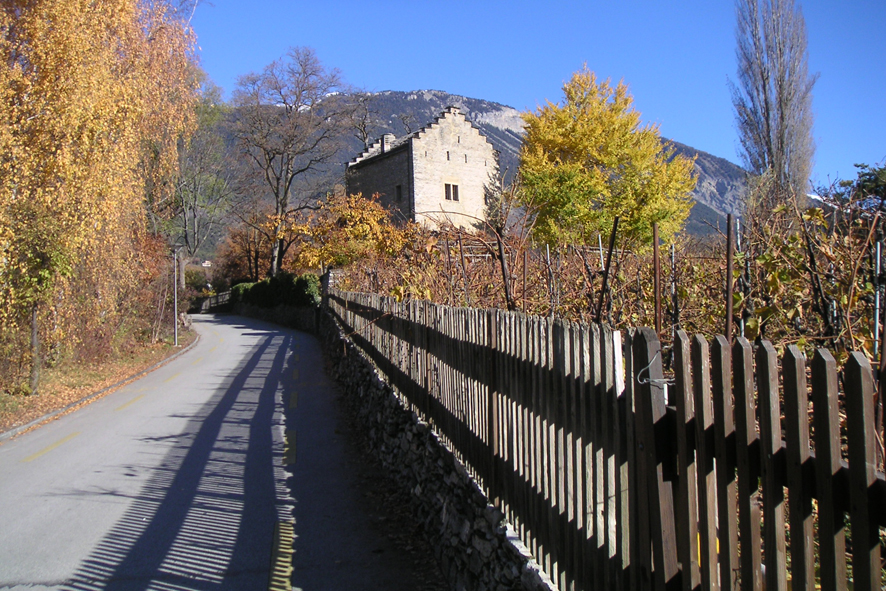
Château de Muzot in Veyras, Switzerland, was where Rilke wrote Sonnets to Orpheus and completed the Duino Elegies in "a savage creative storm" during three weeks in February 1922.

In 1921, Rilke journeyed to Switzerland, hoping to immerse himself among French culture near Geneva and to find a place to live permanently. At the time, he was romantically involved with Baladine Klossowska. At the invitation of Werner Reinhart, Rilke moved into the Château de Muzot, a thirteenth-century manor that lacked gas and electricity, located near Veyras, Rhone Valley, Switzerland. Reinhart, a Swiss merchant and amateur clarinetist, used his wealth to act as a patron to many 20th Century writers and composers. He purchased Muzot to allow Rilke to live there rent-free and focus on his work. Rilke and Klossowska moved in in July 1921 and during the fall Rilke translated writings by Paul Valéry and Michelangelo into German.

With news of the death of his daughter's friend, Wera Knoop, Rilke was inspired to create and set to work on Sonnets to Orpheus. Within a few days, between 2 February and 5 February 1922, he had completed the first section of 26 sonnets. For the next few days, he focused on the Duino Elegies, completing them on the evening of 11 February. Immediately after, he returned to work on the Sonnets and completed the following section of 29 sonnets in less than two weeks. In letters to friends, Rilke referred to this three-week period as a "savage creative storm." Rilke considered both collections to be "of the same birth." Writing to his former lover, Lou Andreas-Salomé, on 11 February, he described this period as "...a boundless storm, a hurricane of the spirit, and whatever inside me is like thread and webbing, framework, it all cracked and bent. No thought of food."

Throughout the Sonnets, Wera appears in frequent references to her, both direct where he addresses her by name and indirect as allusions to a "dancer" or the mythical Eurydice. Later, Rilke wrote to the young girl's mother stating that Wera's ghost was "commanding and impelling" him to write.

== Form and style ==
=== The sonnets ===
There are 55 sonnets in the sequence, divided into two sections: the first of 26 and the second of 29. The sonnets follow certain trends, but they include many different forms.

All of the sonnets are composed of two quatrains followed by two tercets.

The sonnet tradition is not as pronounced in German literature as it is, for example, in English and Italian literature. A possible model for Rilke might have been Charles Baudelaire's Les Fleurs du Mal. To fashion poems in entire cycles was quite common in contemporary practice, the works of Stefan George, Arthur Rimbaud and Stéphane Mallarmé being examples of this. Rilke does not at all stick to the formal standards of the German sonnet fashioned by August Schlegel. The rhyme schemes vary, and are generally ABAB CDCD or ABBA CDDC in the quartets, and EEF GGF, EFG EFG or EFG GFE in the triplets. The sonnets are also all metered, but their meters vary more greatly between poems; dactylic and trochaic are the most common feet, with line length varying greatly, sometimes even within a particular sonnet. Due to the frequent use of enjambment Rilke even breaks through the verse structure. Difficulties in understanding the text arise from pronouns lacking clear reference. So begins, for example, the third sonnet of the first part:

Ein Gott vermags. Wie aber, sag mir, soll
ein Mann ihm folgen durch die schmale Leier?
Sein Sinn ist Zwiespalt. An der Kreuzung zweier
Herzwege steht kein Tempel für Apoll.

A God is able. But tell me, how shall
a man follow him through the narrow lyre?
His mind is divided. At the crossing of two
heart roads there is no temple for Apollo.

It is left to interpretation whether "his mind" refers to the God or the man.

=== Symbolism and themes ===
Rilke and Klossowska at Chateau Muzot 1923

The content of the sonnets is, as is typical of Rilke, highly metaphorical. The work is based on the myth of Orpheus and Eurydice. The character of Orpheus (whom Rilke refers to as the "god with the lyre") appears several times in the cycle, as do other mythical characters such as Daphne. Sources for this are primarily Ovid's Metamorphoses and to a lesser extent Virgil's Georgics. The principle of Ovidian transformations can also be found in and especially between the sonnets. During the first sonnet of Orphic singing, the speech of the forest and the animals is "transformed" into a girl in the second sonnet: And almost a girl it was who emerged / from this joyful unity of song and lyre... During the second sonnet, the focus shifts from the girl to the world: She slept the world... The cycle also contains biblical allusions, including a reference to Esau. Other themes involve animals, peoples of different cultures, and time and death.

While Rilke invokes the original poet Orpheus, a poetic self-reflection takes place at the same time. It frequently addresses the conditions of poetry, the nature of art: Song is being. For the god, a simple matter. / But when are we? (I,3) A solution to these problems can be found in the fifth sonnet of the first part, where Rilke exclaims: Once and forever it's Orpheus, whenever there's song (I,5). This means that the poem always possesses a divine quality, as the poet stands in direct succession to the son of the Muses.

Although Rilke claimed that the entire cycle was inspired by Wera, she appears as a character in only one of the poems. He insisted, however, that "Wera's own figure [...] nevertheless governs and moves the course of the whole".

In May 1922, after deciding he could afford the cost of considerable necessary renovation, the Swiss philanthropist Werner Reinhart bought Muzot so that Rilke could live there rent-free, and became Rilke's patron. He completed the Duino Elegies while Reinhart's tenant. During this time, Reinhart introduced Rilke to his protégée, the Australian violinist Alma Moodie. Rilke was so impressed with her playing that he wrote in a letter: "What a sound, what richness, what determination. That and the Sonnets to Orpheus, those were two strings of the same voice. And she plays mostly Bach! Muzot has received its musical christening..."

== Criticism ==
From early on, there was criticism of Rilke's Sonnets. Thus, already in 1927 Robert Musil described Rilke as the poet who "did nothing but perfect the German poem for the first time", but he limited this judgement to the Duino Elegies as the pinnacle of artistic creation, and described Rilke's Sonnets to Orpheus as an "exceptional falling off that Rilke's work suffers". What Wolfram Groddeck referred to in his afterword to the Reclam edition as a "dilemma of critical reading", was a result of the uncompromising text, which resists simple interpretation. At the same time the quality of lyrical expression undoubtedly constitutes a highlight of German poetic history. Thus, the criticism of the sonnets often fluctuates between the assumption of a sonic primacy over the semantic level and an unconditional affirmation of the cycle.

== Text examples ==
=== Sonnet I,1 ===
Da stieg ein Baum. O reine Übersteigung!
O Orpheus singt! O hoher Baum im Ohr.
Und alles schwieg. Doch selbst in der Verschweigung
ging neuer Anfang, Wink und Wandlung vor.

Tiere aus Stille drangen aus dem klaren
gelösten Wald von Lager und Genist;
und da ergab sich, daß sie nicht aus List
und nicht aus Angst in sich so leise waren,

sondern aus Hören. Brüllen, Schrei, Geröhr
schien klein in ihren Herzen. Und wo eben
kaum eine Hütte war, dies zu empfangen,

ein Unterschlupf aus dunkelstem Verlangen
mit einem Zugang, dessen Pfosten beben, -
da schufst du ihnen Tempel im Gehör.

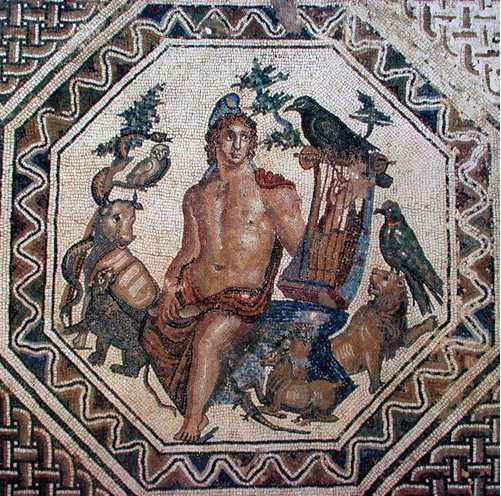
The work's title, as well as many of the sonnets within, pertain to the ancient Greek myth of Orpheus. Here he is depicted with his lyre, charming wild animals of the forest.

There rose a tree. O pure transcendence!
O Orpheus sings! O tall tree in the ear!
And all was silent. Yet still in this silence
proceeded new beginning, sign and transformation.

Creatures of stillness pressed out of the clear
unravelled forest from lair and nest;
and it came to pass, that not by cunning
and not out of fear were they made so quiet,

but simply out of hearing. Bellow, scream, roar
seemed small in their hearts. And just where
there was scarcely a hut to receive this,

a shelter of darkest longing
with an entrance, whose posts shook, -
you built for them a temple in hearing.
