= The Panther (poem) =

German-language poem

- In Jardin des Plantes, Paris
- by Rainer Maria Rilke
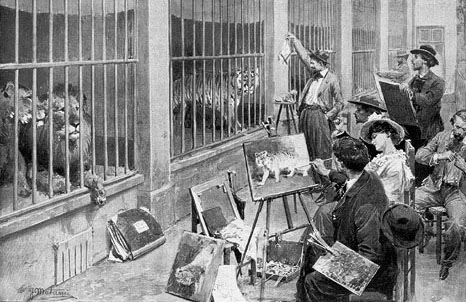
- Artists at the Jardin des Plantes.
- Original title: Der Panther
- Translator: Stanley Appelbaum; C. F. MacIntyre; J. B. Leishman; Walter Arndt; Robert Bly; Jessie Lamont
- Language: German
- Form: Narrative

Full text
- Poems of Rainer Maria Rilke (1918)/The Panther at Wikisource

"The Panther" (subtitled: "In Jardin des Plantes, Paris"; German: Der Panther: Im Jardin des Plantes, Paris) is a poem by Rainer Maria Rilke written between 1902 and 1903. It describes a captured panther behind bars, as it was exhibited in the Ménagerie of the Jardin des Plantes in Paris. It is one of Rilke's most famous poems and has been translated into English many times, including by many distinguished translators of Rilke, such as Stephen Mitchell, C. F. MacIntyre, J. B. Leishman and Walter Arndt, Jessie Lamont and the poet Robert Bly. It is used in the film Awakenings (1990) by the protagonist Leonard Lowe as a metaphor for his physical disability.

== Content ==
The poem consists of three stanzas (strophes), each containing four verses with alternating feminine and masculine cadence:

German

Sein Blick ist vom Vorübergehn der Stäbe
so müd geworden, daß er nichts mehr hält.
Ihm ist, als ob es tausend Stäbe gäbe
und hinter tausend Stäben keine Welt.

Der weiche Gang geschmeidig starker Schritte,
der sich im allerkleinsten Kreise dreht,
ist wie ein Tanz von Kraft um eine Mitte,
in der betäubt ein großer Wille steht.

Nur manchmal schiebt der Vorhang der Pupille
sich lautlos auf –. Dann geht ein Bild hinein,
geht durch der Glieder angespannte Stille –
und hört im Herzen auf zu sein.

English

His gaze against the sweeping of the bars
has grown so weary, it can hold no more.
To him, there seem to be a thousand bars
and back behind those thousand bars no world.

The soft the supple step and sturdy pace,
that in the smallest of all circles turns,
moves like a dance of strength around a core
in which a mighty will is standing stunned.

Only at times the pupil’s curtain slides
up soundlessly — . An image enters then,
goes through the tensioned stillness of the limbs —
and in the heart ceases to be.

— English translation by Stanley Appelbaum

English

His vision, from the constantly passing bars,
has grown so weary that it cannot hold
anything else. It seems to him there are
a thousand bars; and behind the bars, no world.

As he paces in cramped circles, over and over,
the movement of his powerful soft strides
is like a ritual dance around a center
in which a mighty will stands paralyzed.

Only at times, the curtain of the pupils
lifts, quietly--. An image enters in,
rushes down through the tensed, arrested muscles,
plunges into the heart and is gone.

— English translation by Stephen Mitchell
