= Duino Elegies =

Book by Rainer Maria Rilke

Duineser Elegien Duino Elegies
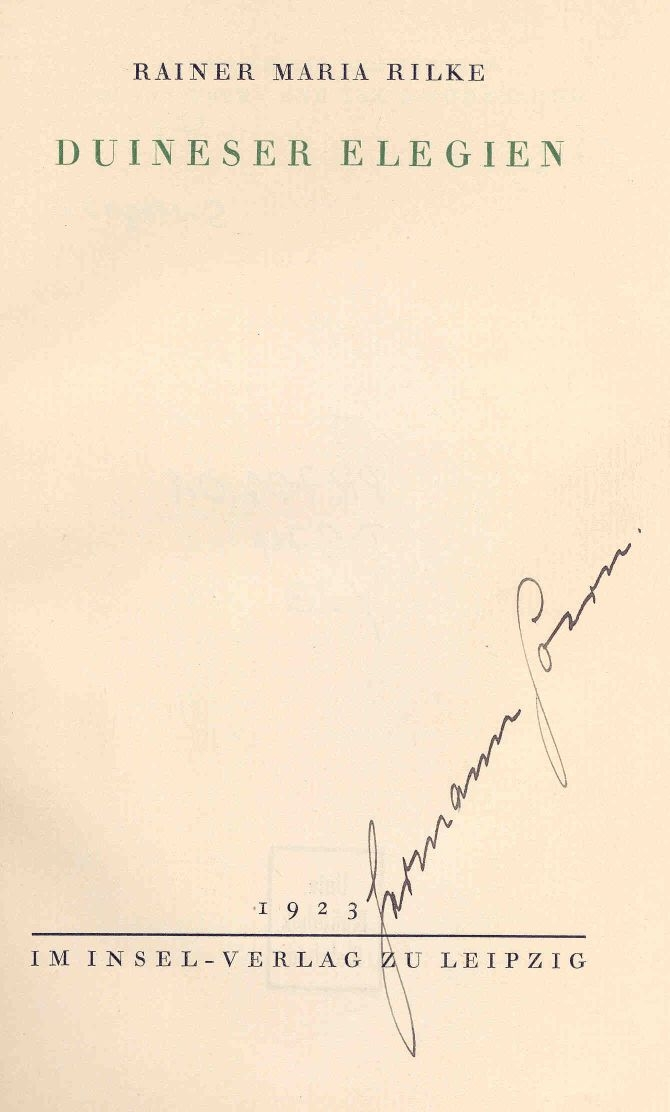
- Title page of the first edition
- Author: Rainer Maria Rilke
- Original title: Duineser Elegien
- Language: German
- Genre: Elegy
- Published: 1923 Insel-Verlag
- Original text: Duineser Elegien at German Wikisource

The Duino Elegies (German: Duineser Elegien) are a collection of ten elegies written by the Bohemian-Austrian poet Rainer Maria Rilke. He was then "widely recognized as one of the most lyrically intense German-language poets", and began the elegies in 1912 while a guest of Princess Marie von Thurn und Taxis at Duino Castle on the Adriatic Sea. The poems were dedicated to the Princess upon their publication in 1923. During this ten-year period, the elegies languished incomplete for long stretches of time as Rilke had frequent bouts with severe depression—some of which were related to the events of World War I and being conscripted into military service.

Aside from brief periods of writing in 1913 and 1915, he did not return to the work until a few years after the war ended. With a sudden, renewed burst of frantic writing which he described as a "boundless storm, a hurricane of the spirit"—he completed the collection in February 1922 while staying at Château de Muzot in Veyras, Switzerland. After their publication in 1923, the Duino Elegies were soon recognized as his most important work.

The Duino Elegies are intensely religious, mystical poems that employ the symbolism of angels and salvation, but in a manner atypical of Christian interpretations. Rilke begins the first elegy in an invocation of philosophical despair, asking: "Who, if I cried out, would hear me among the angelic orders?" (Wer, wenn ich schriee, hörte mich denn aus der Engel Ordnungen?) and later declares that "each single angel is terrifying" (Jeder Engel ist schrecklich). While labelling of these poems as "elegies" would typically imply melancholy and lamentation, many passages are marked by their positive energy.

Together, the Duino Elegies are described as a metamorphosis of Rilke's "ontological torment" and an "impassioned monologue about coming to terms with human existence", discussing themes of "the limitations and insufficiency of the human condition and fractured human consciousness ... man's loneliness, the perfection of the angels, life and death, love and lovers, and the task of the poet". Rilke's poetry, and the Duino Elegies in particular, influenced many of the poets and writers of the twentieth century. In popular culture, his work is frequently quoted on the subject of love or of angels and referenced in television programs, motion pictures, music and other artistic works, in New Age philosophy and theology, and in self-help books.

== Writing and publication history ==
Rilke began writing the first and second elegies at Duino Castle, near Trieste, Italy, after hearing a voice in the wind while walking along the cliffs.

=== Duino Castle and the first elegies ===
In 1910 Rilke completed the loosely autobiographical novel Die Aufzeichnungen des Malte Laurids Brigge (The Notebooks of Malte Laurids Brigge), in which a young poet is terrified by the fragmentation and chaos of modern urban life after he experienced a psychological crisis accompanied by severe depression. Rilke was invited in late 1911 to Duino Castle, then part of Austria-Hungary, by Princess Marie von Thurn und Taxis, whom he had met a few years earlier.

Rilke and Marie collaborated on a translation of Dante's La Vita Nuova (The New Life) while at Duino. After the Princess left to join her husband at their Lautschin estate, Rilke spent the next few weeks alone to focus on his work. While writing Das Marien-Leben (The Life of Mary) in January 1912, Rilke claimed that he heard a voice calling in the roar of the wind while walking along the cliffs near the castle, speaking the words that would become the first lines of the Duino Elegies: "Wer, wenn ich schriee, hörte mich denn aus der Engel Ordnungen?" ("Who, if I cried out, would hear me among the hierarchies of angels?") He quickly wrote them in his notebook and completed the draft of the '"First Elegy" that night. Within days, he drafted the "Second Elegy" and composed passages and fragments that would later be incorporated into later elegies—including the opening passage of the "Tenth Elegy".

In the following years, Rilke worked sporadically on the elegies. While staying at Ronda, Spain in 1913, he wrote part of what would become the "Sixth Elegy". He moved to Paris later that year where he continued work on the "Sixth Elegy" and completed the "Third Elegy". During World War I, Rilke wrote the "Fourth Elegy", completing it the day before he was conscripted into the Austro-Hungarian army in November 1915. After Rilke was discharged in 1916, he returned to Munich for the duration of the war, but wrote very little poetry during that time.

=== Château de Muzot and the creative "hurricane" ===
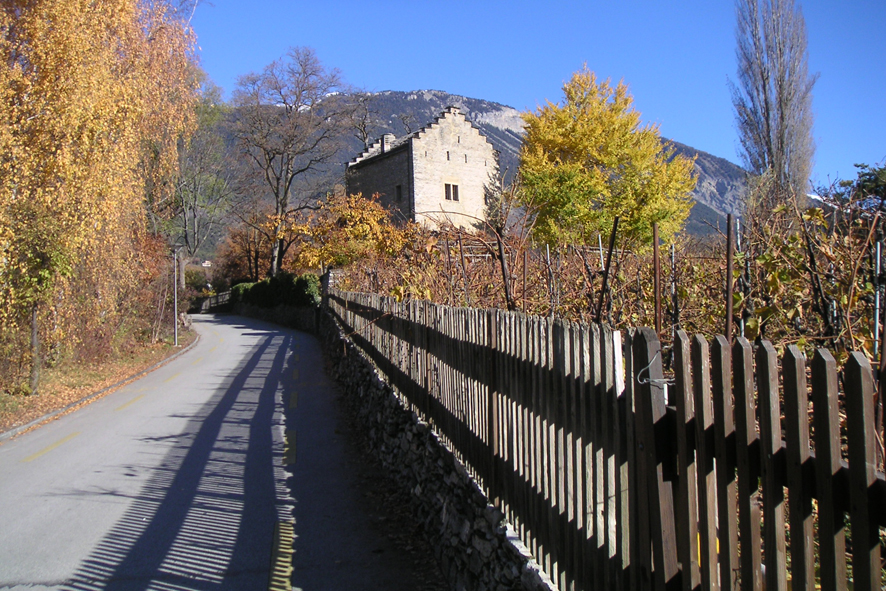
Rilke completed the Duino Elegies at Château de Muzot in Veyras, Switzerland, in a "boundless storm" of creativity in February 1922.

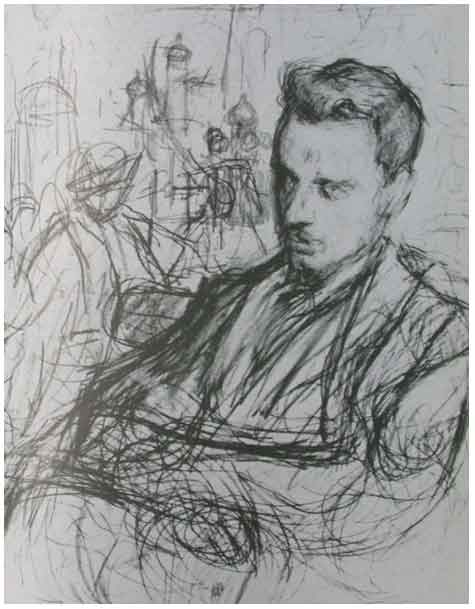
Rilke in a sketch by Leonid Pasternak

It wasn't until 1920 that Rilke began to focus on completing the Duino Elegies. Rilke, who had become romantically involved with Baladine Klossowska, journeyed to Switzerland looking to find a place to live near Geneva, where he could immerse himself in French culture. Rilke and Klossowska wanted to move into the Château de Muzot, a 13th-century manor house that lacked gas and electricity, near Veyras in the Rhone Valley, but they had trouble negotiating the lease. At Rilke's suggestion, Werner Reinhart, a Swiss merchant who used his wealth to support composers and writers, leased the property on their behalf. In July 1921, Rilke and Klossowska had moved in. Later, Reinhart bought the property and turned it over to Rilke for life.

During the summer of 1921, Rilke's daughter Ruth became engaged. In December, he sent a letter to Gertrud Ouckama Knoop, widow of his deceased friend Gerhard Ouckama Knoop and mother of the dancer Wera Ouckama Knoop, who was once a friend of Ruth's, announcing the engagement. In turn, Gertrud sent an account of Wera's death at age 19 that moved Rilke to compose the Sonnets to Orpheus and complete the Duino Elegies. Rilke wrote that Wera's image dominates and moves the Sonnets. They frequently refer to her, directly addressing her by name and indirectly through allusions to a dancer or the mythical Eurydice. Rilke composed in a rush of inspiration: writing nearly all the poems of Part I of the Sonnets between 2–5 February 1922, completing the Duino Elegies between 7–15 February, and completing the remaining poems of Sonnets between 16–22 February. Rilke saw the creation of the Sonnets and Elegies as a twin birth. (Note: Rilke stated that "The Elegies and the Sonnets support each other reciprocally, and I see it as an endless blessing that I, with the same breath, was able to fill both sails: the small, rust-colored sail of the Sonnets and the great white canvas of the Elegies.") In the midst of his writing, Rilke wrote Klossowska: "That which weighed upon and tortured me is accomplished ... but never within my heart and mind have I borne such a hurricane. I am still trembling from it ... And I went out to caress this old Muzot, just now, in the moonlight." Immediately after completing the Elegies, he wrote Lou Andreas-Salomé that he had finished "all in a few days; it was a hurricane, as at Duino that time: all that was fiber, fabric in me, framework, cracked and bent."

=== Publication and reception ===
Duino Elegies, which are 859 lines long, (Note: The elegies vary in length. In the Rilke's original German text the First Elegy is 95 lines; Second Elegy, 79 lines; Third Elegy, 85 lines; Fourth Elegy, 85 lines; Fifth Elegy, 108 lines; Sixth Elegy, 45 lines; Seventh Elegy, 93 lines; Eighth Elegy, 75 lines; Ninth Elegy, 80 lines; Tenth Elegy, 114 lines. The several English translations differ in line count.) was published by Insel-Verlag in Leipzig in 1923. Prominent critics praised the work and compared its merits to the works of Hölderlin and Goethe. During the 1920s, many of the younger generation of poets and writers did not like Duino Elegies because of the poems' obscure symbols and philosophy. The poet Albrecht Schaeffer, who is associated with the literary circle of Stefan George, dismissed the poems as "mystical blather" and described their "secular theology" as "impotent gossip". Novelist Hermann Hesse describes Rilke as evolving into his best poetry with the Duino Elegies, that "at each stage now and again the miracle occurs, his delicate, hesitant, anxiety-prone person withdraws, and through him resounds the music of the universe; like the basin of a fountain he becomes at once instrument and ear". In 1935, critic Hans-Rudolf Müller argued that Rilke could be seen as a mystic and the poems could be treated as mystical literature, whereas more recent critics believe the poems should be seen as a study of mysticism itself.

Theodor W. Adorno wrote "But the fact that the neoromantic lyric sometimes behaves like the jargon, or at least timidly readies the way for it, should not lead us to look for the evil of the poetry simply in its form. It is not simply grounded, as a much too innocent view might maintain, in the mixture of poetry and prose.... The evil, in the neoromantic lyric, consists in the fitting out of the words with a theological overtone, which is belied by the condition of the lonely and secular subject who is speaking there: religion as ornament." Adorno further believed the poems reinforced the German value of commitment that supported a cultural attraction towards the principles of Nazism.

== Symbolism and themes ==
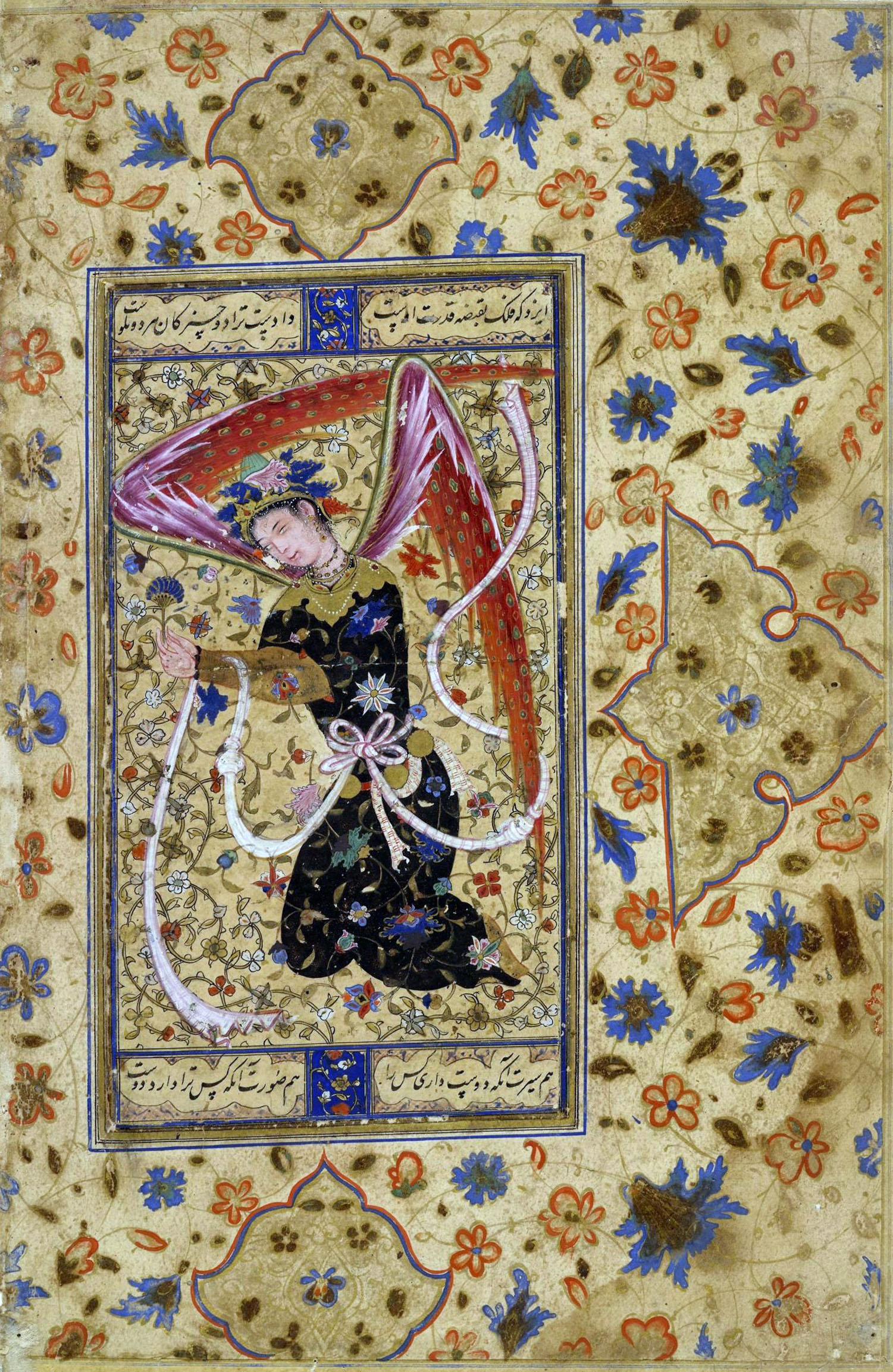
Rilke employs the rich symbolism of angels influenced by their depiction in Islam to represent the embodiment of transcendental beauty.

Throughout the Duino Elegies, Rilke explored themes of "the limitations and insufficiency of the human condition and fractured human consciousness ... mankind's loneliness, the perfection of the angels, life and death, love and lovers, and the task of the poet". Philosopher Martin Heidegger remarked that "the long way leading to the poetry is itself one that inquires poetically", and that Rilke "comes to realize the destitution of the time more clearly. The time remains destitute not only because God is dead, but because mortals are hardly aware and capable even of their own mortality." Rilke explores the nature of mankind's contact with beauty, and its transience, noting that humanity is forever only getting a brief, momentary glimpse of an inconceivable beauty and that it is terrifying. At the onset of the First Elegy, Rilke describes this frightened experience, defining beauty as

... nothing
but beginning of Terror we're still just able to bear,
and why we adore it so is because it serenely
disdains to destroy us.

Rilke depicted this infinite, transcendental beauty with the symbol of angels. However, he did not use the traditional Christian interpretation of angels. He sought to utilize a symbol of the angel that was secular, divorced from religious doctrine and embodied a tremendous transcendental beauty. In this, however, Rilke commented that he was greatly influenced by the depiction of angels found in Islam. For Rilke, the symbol of the angel represents a perfection that is "beyond human contradictions and limitations" in a "higher level of reality in the invisible". Where there is incongruity that adds to mankind's despair and anxiety is due to human nature keeping us clinging to the visible and the familiar. As mankind encounters the invisible and unknown higher levels represented by these angels, the experience of the invisible will be "terrifying" (in German, schrecklich).

As mankind came in contact with the terrifying beauty represented by these angels, Rilke was concerned with the experience of existential angst in trying to come to terms with the coexistence of the spiritual and earthly. He portrayed human beings as alone in a universe where God is abstract and possibly non-existent, "where memory and patterns of intuition raise the sensitive consciousness to a realization of solitude". Rilke depicted the alternative, a spiritually fulfilling possibility beyond human limitations, in the form of angels. Beginning with the first line of the collection, Rilke's despairing speaker calls upon the angels to notice human suffering and to intervene. There is a deeply felt despair and unresolvable tension in that no matter man's striving, the limitation of human and earthly existence renders humanity unable to reach out to the angels. The narrative voice Rilke employed in the Duino Elegies strives "to achieve in human consciousness the angel's presumed plenitude of being" (i.e. being, or existence, in German: Dasein).

Rilke used the images of love and of lovers as a way of showing mankind's potential and humanity's failures in achieving the transcendent understanding embodied by the angels. In the Second Elegy, Rilke wrote:

Lovers, if Angels could understand them, might utter
strange things in the midnight air.

He depicted "the inadequacy of ordinary lovers", and contrasted a feminine form of "sublime love" and a masculine "blind animal passion". At the time the first elegies were written, Rilke often "expressed a longing for human companionship and affection, and then, often immediately afterwards, asking whether he could really respond to such companionship if it were offered to him ..." He noticed a "decline in the lives of lovers ... when they began to receive, they also began to lose the power of giving". Later, during World War I, he would lament that "the world has fallen into the hands of men". In the face of death, life and love are not cheap and meaningless, and Rilke asserted that great lovers are able to recognize all three (life, love, and death) as part of a unity.

Rilke wrote his Fifth Elegy inspired by his memory of seeing Picasso's painting Les Saltimbanques (1905) in Paris several years earlier.

In a 1923 letter to Nanny von Escher, Rilke confided:

Two inmost experiences were decisive for their [i.e., The Sonnets to Orpheus and The Duino Elegies] production: The resolve that grew up more and more in my spirit to hold life open toward death, and on the other side, the spiritual need to situate the transformation of love in this wider whole differently than was possible in the narrower orbit of life (which simply shut out death as the other).

The Fifth Elegy is largely inspired by Pablo Picasso's 1905 Rose Period painting Les Saltimbanques ("The Acrobats", also known as "The Family of Saltimbanques"), in which Picasso depicts six figures pictured "in the middle of a desert landscape and it is impossible to say whether they are arriving or departing, beginning or ending their performance". Rilke depicted the six artists about to begin their performance, and that they were used as a symbol of "human activity ... always travelling and with no fixed abode, they are even a shade more fleeting than the rest of us, whose fleetingness was lamented". Further, Rilke in the poem described these figures as standing on a "threadbare carpet" to suggest "the ultimate loneliness and isolation of Man in this incomprehensible world, practicing their profession from childhood to death as playthings of an unknown will ... before their 'pure too-little' had passed into 'empty too-much'".

Because of the profound impact that the war had on him, Rilke expressed hope that the task of the intellectual in a post-war world would be to render the world right, preparing people for those gentle transformations that lead to a more serene future. He envisioned the Duino Elegies and the Sonnets to Orpheus as part of his contribution.

== Influence ==
Rilke and Baladine Klossowska at the Château de Muzot (circa 1922). The two pursued an intense but episodic romance from 1919 until Rilke's death in 1926.

The earliest published translation of the Duino Elegies was by Edward and Vita Sackville-West. It was published in 1931 by Hogarth Press in England, and titled Duineser Elegien: Elegies from the Castle of Duino. (Note: See Sackville & Sackville 1931.) As of 2014, at least 24 English-language translations had been published.

Rilke is often seen as a spiritual guide in popular culture. In the United States, his poetry has been read as wisdom literature, and has been compared to the thirteenth-century Sufi (Muslim) mystic Rumi (1207–1273), and 20th century Lebanese-American poet Kahlil Gibran (1883–1931). In popular culture, Rilke is frequently quoted or referenced in television programs, motion pictures, music and other works when these works discuss the subject of love or angels. Rilke's works have also been appropriated for use by the New Age community and in self-help books, and he has been reinterpreted "as a master who can lead us to a more fulfilled and less anxious life". (Note: Examples include: Rilke, Rainer Maria; Mood, John J. L. (1975). Rilke on love and other difficulties. Translations and considerations of Rainer Maria Rilke. New York: Norton. ISBN 0-393-04390-8. OCLC 867977.; and a book released by Rilke’s own publisher Insel Verlag, Rilke, Rainer Maria; Hauschild, Vera (1998). Rilke für Gestresste (in German). Frankfurt am Main: Insel Taschenbuch. ISBN 3-458-33891-8. OCLC 41986277.)

Rilke's work, and specifically, the Duino Elegies have influenced many poets, including Galway Kinnell, Sidney Keyes, John Ashbery, and W. H. Auden. The novelist Thomas Pynchon novel Gravity's Rainbow shows echoes of Rilke; its first lines mirror the first lines of the first elegy, with a "sound [that] is [the] scream of a V-2 rocket hitting London in 1944"; and The New York Times reviewer of Gravity's Rainbow wrote that, "the book could be read as a serio-comic variation on Rilke's Duino Elegies and their German Romantic echoes in Nazi culture".

Rilke's Duino Elegies influenced Hans-Georg Gadamer's theories of hermeneutics—understanding how an observer (i.e. reader, listener, or viewer) interprets cultural artifacts (i.e. works of literature, music, or art) as a series of distinct encounters. Gadamer saw Rilke as a philosophical poet whose work reveals the limits of human comprehension. He argues that the alienation of the contemporary world stands as an obstacle to making sense of such encounters. According to Gadamer, Rilke's point toward how to approach those limits, by making these part of ourselves interpretation and reinterpretation can we address the existential problems of humanity's significance and impermanence.

== See also ==
List of Duino Elegies Translations
