= Die Insel (magazine, 1899–1901) =

Literary periodical

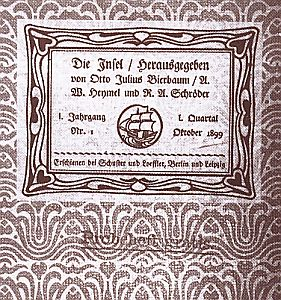
Cover of the first edition, 1899

Die Insel (in English "The Island") was a German literary and art magazine that was published in Munich from 1899 to 1901 by Otto Julius Bierbaum, Alfred Walter Heymel, and Rudolf Alexander Schröder.

Despite its short life, it is considered one of the most important German literary magazines of early modernism. The magazine published texts from already well-known authors like Hugo von Hofmannsthal and Rainer Maria Rilke as well as from new voices like Robert Walser.

The symbol of the magazine, a sailing boat, was designed by Peter Behrens. It is still the logo of the Insel Verlag publishing company, which arose from the magazine.

== Authors ==
- Otto Julius Bierbaum
- Max Dauthendey
- Richard Dehmel
- Hugo von Hofmannsthal
- Arno Holz
- Maurice Maeterlinck
- Rainer Maria Rilke
- Paul Scheerbart
- August Strindberg
- Robert Walser
- Frank Wedekind
