= Rainer Maria Rilke =

Austrian poet and writer (1875–1926)

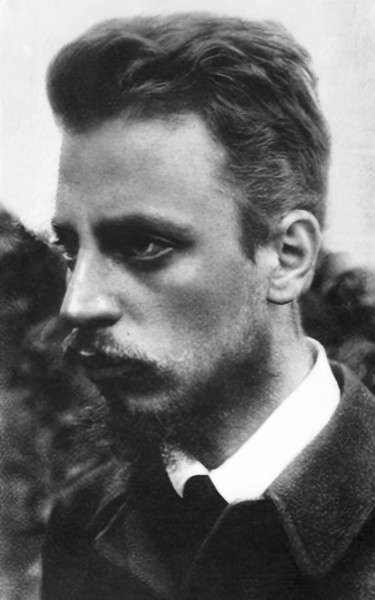
- Rilke in 1900
- Born: René Karl Wilhelm Johann Josef Maria Rilke; 4 December 1875; Prague, Bohemia, Austria-Hungary
- Died: 29 December 1926 (aged 51); Montreux, Vaud, Switzerland
- Occupations: Poet, novelist
- Spouse: Clara Westhoff (m. 1901)
- Children: 1
- Writing career
- Language: German, French
- Period: 1894–1925
- Movement: Modernism

René Karl Wilhelm Johann Josef Maria Rilke (4 December 1875 – 29 December 1926), known as Rainer Maria Rilke, (Note: German: [ˈʁaɪnɐ maˈʁiːa ˈʁɪlkə] or Austrian German: [ˈraɪnɐ maˈriːa ˈrɪlkə]) was an Austrian poet. Acclaimed as an idiosyncratic and expressive poet, he is widely recognized as a significant writer in the German language. His work is viewed by critics and scholars as possessing undertones of mysticism, exploring themes of subjective experience and disbelief. His writings include one novel, several collections of poetry, several volumes of correspondence and a few early novellas.

Rilke travelled extensively throughout Europe, finally settling in Switzerland, which provided the inspiration for many of his poems. While Rilke is best known for his contributions to German literature, he also wrote in French. Among English-language readers, his best-known works include two poetry collections: Duino Elegies (Duineser Elegien) and Sonnets to Orpheus (Die Sonette an Orpheus), and a semi-autobiographical novel? The Notebooks of Malte Laurids Brigge (Die Aufzeichnungen des Malte Laurids Brigge). A collection of ten letters was published posthumously as Letters to a Young Poet (Briefe an einen jungen Dichter).

In the later 20th century, his work found new audiences in citations by self-help authors and frequent quotations in television shows, books and motion pictures.

== Biography ==
=== Early life (1875–1896) ===
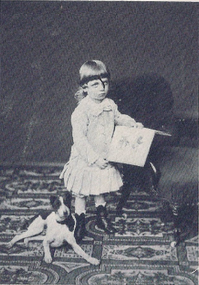
Rilke, circa 1878–1879

He was born René Karl Wilhelm Johann Josef Maria Rilke in Prague, capital of Kingdom of Bohemia (then ruled by Austria-Hungary, now capital of the Czech Republic). His father, Josef Rilke (1838–1906), found employment as a railway official after an unsuccessful military career. His mother, Sophie ("Phia") Entz (1851–1931), was from a well-to-do family in Prague, the Entz-Kinzelbergers, who lived at Herrengasse (Panská) 8, where René spent many of his early years.

His childhood was not always a happy one, and the relationship between Phia and her only son was colored by her mourning for an earlier infant daughter who died within one week. During Rilke's early years, Phia acted as if she sought to recover the lost daughter by treating Rilke as if he were a girl. According to Rilke, he had to wear "fine clothes" and "was a plaything [for his mother], like a big doll". (Note: From the mid-16th century until the early 20th century, young boys in the Western world were unbreeched and wore gowns or dresses until an age that varied between two and eight.) His parents separated in 1884.

His parents enrolled the poetically and artistically talented youth in a military academy in Sankt Pölten, Lower Austria. He attended classes from 1886 until 1891, but left due to illness. He then moved to Linz, and entered a trade school. During this time he lived with Hans Drouot (publisher and owner of the printing and publishing company Jos. Feichtingers Erben) at Graben 19 on the 3rd floor.

Expelled in May 1892, the 16-year-old returned to Prague, where, for three years, he was tutored for the university entrance exam, which he passed in 1895. He took classes in literature, art history, and philosophy in Prague, until 1896 when he left school and moved to Munich.

=== Munich and Saint Petersburg ===
Rilke met and fell in love with the widely travelled and intellectual woman of letters Lou Andreas-Salomé in 1897 in Munich. He changed his first name from "René" to "Rainer" at Salomé's urging because she thought that name to be more masculine, forceful and Germanic. His relationship with this married woman, with whom he undertook two extensive trips to Russia, lasted until 1900. Even after their separation, Salomé continued to be Rilke's most important confidante until the end of his life. Having trained from 1912 to 1913 as a psychoanalyst with Sigmund Freud, she shared her knowledge of psychoanalysis with Rilke.

In 1898, Rilke undertook a journey of several weeks to Italy. The following year he travelled with Lou and her husband, Friedrich Carl Andreas, to Moscow where he met the novelist Leo Tolstoy. Between May and August 1900, a second journey to Russia, accompanied only by Lou, again took him to Moscow and Saint Petersburg, where he met the family of Boris Pasternak and Spiridon Drozhzhin, a peasant poet. Author Anna A. Tavis cites the cultures of Bohemia and Russia as the key influences on Rilke's poetry and consciousness.

In 1900, Rilke stayed at the artists' colony at Worpswede. (Later, his portrait would be painted by the proto-expressionist Paula Modersohn-Becker, whom he got to know at Worpswede.) It was here that he got to know the sculptor Clara Westhoff, whom he married the following year. Their daughter Ruth (1901–1972) was born in December 1901.

=== Paris (1902–1910) ===
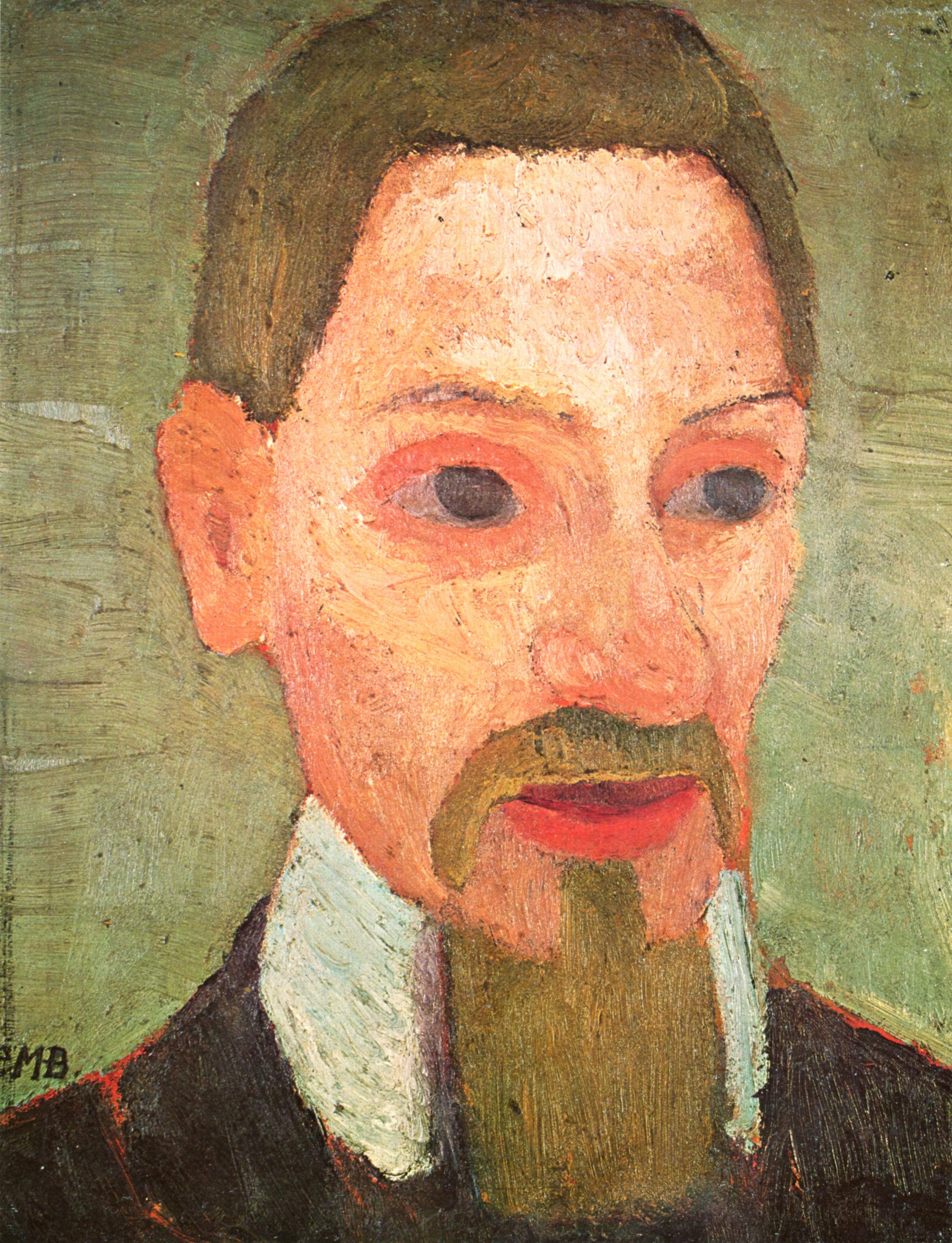
Paula Modersohn-Becker (1876–1907), an early expressionist painter, became acquainted with Rilke in Worpswede and Paris, and painted his portrait in 1906.

In the summer of 1902, Rilke left home and travelled to Paris to write a monograph on the sculptor Auguste Rodin. Before long his wife left their daughter with her parents and joined Rilke there. The relationship between Rilke and Clara Westhoff continued for the rest of his life; a mutually-agreed-upon effort towards a divorce was bureaucratically hindered by the fact that Rilke was a Catholic, albeit a non-practicing one.

At first, Rilke had a difficult time in Paris, an experience that he called upon in the first part of his only novel, The Notebooks of Malte Laurids Brigge. At the same time his encounter with modernism was very stimulating: Rilke became deeply involved with the sculpture of Rodin and then the work of Paul Cézanne. For a time, he acted as Rodin's secretary, also lecturing and writing a long essay on Rodin and his work. Rodin taught him the value of objective observation and, under this influence, Rilke dramatically transformed his poetic style from the subjective and sometimes incantatory language of his earlier work into something quite new in European literature. The result was the New Poems, famous for the "thing-poems" expressing Rilke's rejuvenated artistic vision. During these years, Paris increasingly became the writer's main residence.

In 1906, at Rodin's studio in Meudon, Rilke met Sidonie Nádherná of Borutín. He first visited her family estate at Vrchotovy Janovice in November 1907 and returned for a three-week stay in 1910, during which he wrote several poems inspired by the surrounding landscape.

The most important works of the Paris period were Neue Gedichte (New Poems) (1907), Der Neuen Gedichte Anderer Teil (Another Part of the New Poems) (1908), the two "Requiem" poems (1909), and the novel The Notebooks of Malte Laurids Brigge, started in 1904 and completed in January 1910.

During the later part of this decade, Rilke spent extended periods in Ronda, the famous bullfighting centre in southern Spain, where he kept a permanent room at the Hotel Reina Victoria from December 1912 to February 1913.

=== Duino and the First World War (1911–1919) ===
Duino Castle near Trieste, Italy, was where Rilke began writing the Duino Elegies in 1912, recounting that he heard the famous first line as a voice in the wind while walking along the cliffs and that he wrote it quickly in his notebook.

Between October 1911 and May 1912, Rilke stayed at the Castle Duino, near Trieste, home of Princess Marie of Thurn und Taxis. There, in 1912, he began the poem cycle called the Duino Elegies, which would remain unfinished for a decade because of a long-lasting creativity crisis. Rilke had developed an admiration for El Greco as early as 1908, so he visited Toledo during the winter of 1912/13 to see his paintings. It has been suggested that El Greco's manner of depicting angels influenced the conception of the angel in the Duino Elegies. The outbreak of World War I surprised Rilke during a stay in Germany. He was unable to return to Paris, where his property was confiscated and auctioned. He spent the greater part of the war in Munich. From 1914 to 1916 he had a turbulent affair with the painter Lou Albert-Lasard. Rilke was called up at the beginning of 1916 and had to undertake basic training in Vienna. Influential friends interceded on his behalf – he was transferred to the War Records Office and discharged from the military on 9 June 1916. He returned to Munich, interrupted by a stay at Hertha Koenig's manor Gut Bockel in Westphalia. The traumatic experience of military service, a reminder of the horrors of the military academy, almost completely silenced him as a poet.

=== Switzerland and Muzot (1919–1926) ===
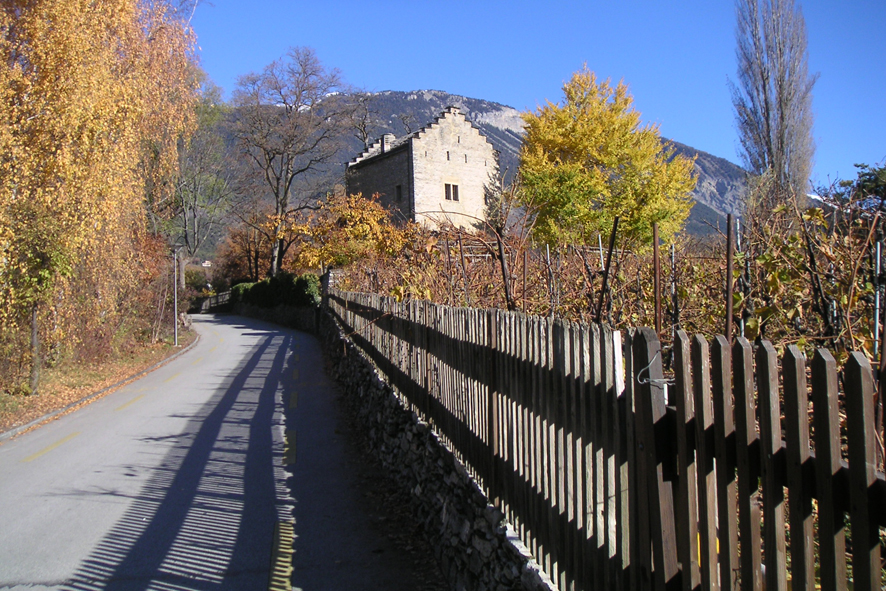
Château de Muzot in Veyras, Switzerland, was where Rilke completed writing the Duino Elegies in "a savage creative storm" in February 1922.

Rilke and Klossowska at Chateau Muzot 1923

On 11 June 1919, Rilke travelled from Munich to Switzerland. He met Polish-German painter Baladine Klossowska, with whom he was in a relationship until his death in 1926. The outward motive was an invitation to lecture in Zurich, but the real reason was the wish to escape the post-war chaos and take up his work on the Duino Elegies once again. The search for a suitable and affordable place to live proved to be very difficult. Among other places, Rilke lived in Soglio, Locarno and Berg am Irchel. It was only in mid-1921 that he was able to find a permanent residence in the Château de Muzot in the commune of Veyras, close to Sierre in Valais. In an intense creative period, Rilke completed the Duino Elegies in several weeks in February 1922. Before and after this period, Rilke rapidly wrote both parts of the poem cycle Sonnets to Orpheus containing 55 entire sonnets. Together, these two have often been taken as constituting the high points of Rilke's work. In May 1922, Rilke's patron Werner Reinhart bought and renovated Muzot so that Rilke could live there rent-free.

During this time, Reinhart introduced Rilke to his protégée, the Australian violinist Alma Moodie. Rilke was so impressed with her playing that he wrote in a letter: "What a sound, what richness, what determination. That and the Sonnets to Orpheus, those were two strings of the same voice. And she plays mostly Bach! Muzot has received its musical christening..."

From 1923 on, Rilke increasingly struggled with health problems that necessitated many long stays at a sanatorium in Territet near Montreux on Lake Geneva. His long stay in Paris between January and August 1925 was an attempt to escape his illness through a change in location and living conditions. Despite this, numerous important individual poems appeared in the years 1923–1926 (including Gong and Mausoleum), as well as his abundant lyrical work in French. His book of French poems Vergers was published in 1926.

In 1924, Erika Mitterer began writing poems to Rilke, who wrote back with approximately 50 poems of his own and called her verse a Herzlandschaft (landscape of the heart). This was the only time Rilke had a productive poetic collaboration throughout all his work. Mitterer visited Rilke in November 1925. In 1950 her Correspondence in Verse with Rilke was published and received much praise.

=== Admiring Russian Revolution and far left ===
Rilke supported the Russian Revolution in 1917 as well as the Bavarian Soviet Republic in 1919. He became friends with Ernst Toller and mourned the deaths of Rosa Luxemburg, Kurt Eisner, and Karl Liebknecht. He confided that of the five or six newspapers he read daily, those on the far left came closest to his own opinions. He developed a reputation for supporting left-wing causes and thus, out of fear for his own safety, became more reticent about politics after the Bavarian Republic was crushed by the right-wing Freikorps.

=== Death and burial ===
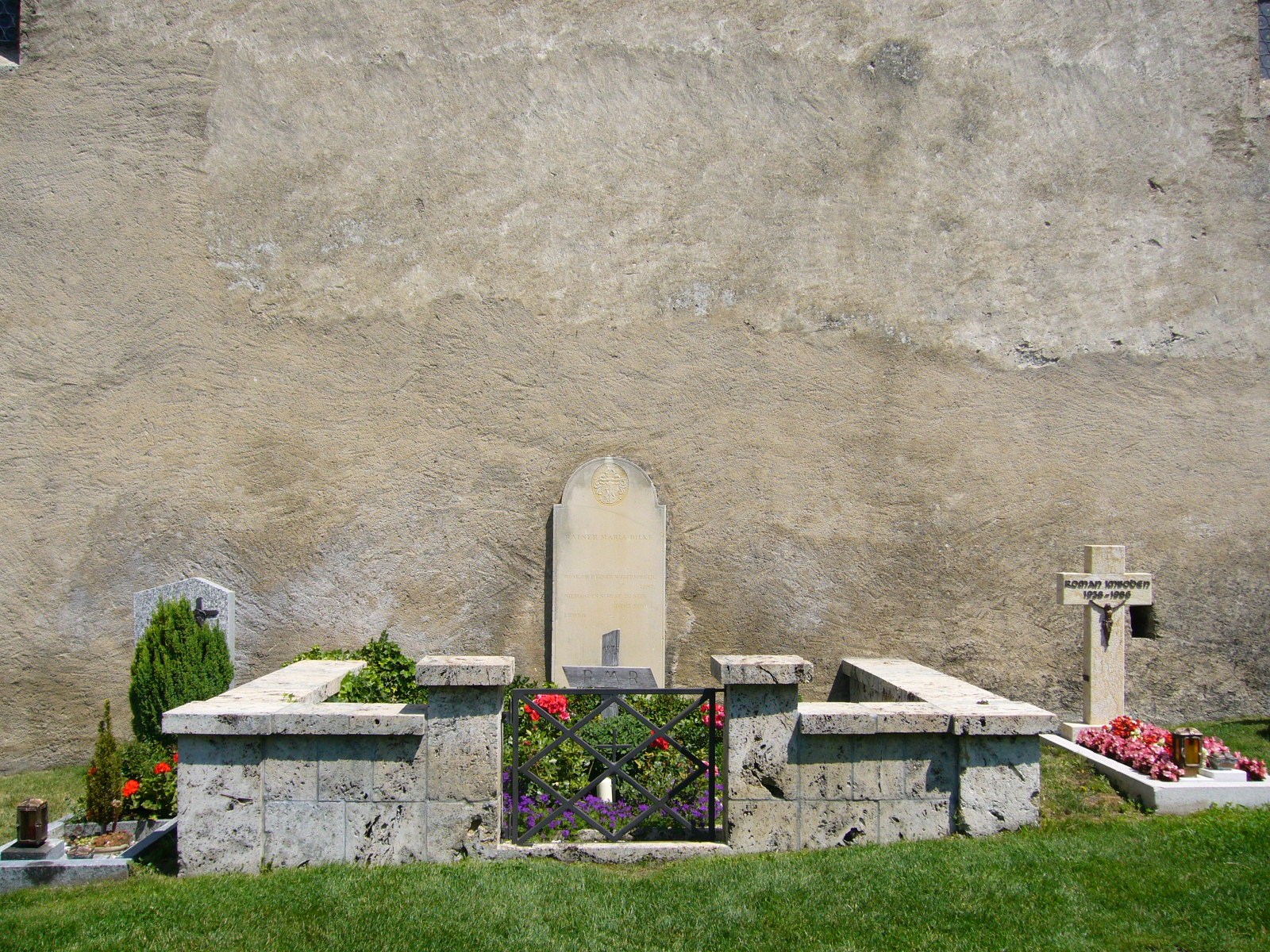
Rilke's grave in Raron, Switzerland

Shortly before his death, Rilke's illness was diagnosed as leukemia. He suffered ulcerous sores in his mouth, pain troubled his stomach and intestines, and he struggled with increasingly low spirits. Open-eyed, he died in the arms of his doctor on 29 December 1926, in the Valmont Sanatorium in Switzerland. He was buried on 2 January 1927, in the Raron cemetery to the west of Visp.

Rilke chose as his own epitaph this poem:

Rose, oh reiner Widerspruch, Lust,
Niemandes Schlaf zu sein unter soviel
Lidern.

Rose, o pure contradiction, desire
to be no one's sleep beneath so many
lids.

A myth developed surrounding his death and roses. It was said: "To honour a visitor, the Egyptian beauty Nimet Eloui Bey, Rilke gathered some roses from his garden. While doing so, he pricked his hand on a thorn. This small wound failed to heal, grew rapidly worse, soon his entire arm was swollen, and his other arm became affected as well", and so he died.

== Writings ==
=== "The Panther" ===
"The Panther" is an influential poem describing life from the perspective of an animal in a zoo, which focused more on its cage than on humans, one of the first to do so, part of an early counter-movement against anthropomorphic views of animals and nature along with individuals such as Jakob von Uexküll, a writer of perspectives of creatures such as jellyfish and ticks, a man with whom he corresponded, and poet Hugo von Hofmannsthal who wrote from the perspective of a man who had language become like 'rotten mushrooms' in his mouth.

=== The Book of Hours ===
Rilke's three complete cycles of poems that constitute The Book of Hours (Das Stunden-Buch) were published by Insel Verlag in April 1905. These poems explore the Christian search for God and the nature of Prayer, using symbolism from Saint Francis and Rilke's observation of Orthodox Christianity during his travels to Ukraine in the early years of the twentieth century.

=== The Notebooks of Malte Laurids Brigge ===
Rilke wrote his only novel, Die Aufzeichnungen des Malte Laurids Brigge (translated as The Notebooks of Malte Laurids Brigge), while living in Paris, completing the work in 1910. The narrative takes the form of a rambling novelette filled with poetic language and contains, among other things, a retelling of the prodigal son tale, a striking description of death by illness, an ode to the joys of roaming free during childhood, a chilling description of how people wear false faces with others, and a snarky comment about the weirdness of neighbors.

This semi-autobiographical novel adopts the style and technique that became associated with Expressionism which entered European fiction and art in the early 20th century. He was inspired by Sigbjørn Obstfelder's work A Priest's Diary and Jens Peter Jacobsen's novel Niels Lyhne (1880) which traces the fate of an atheist in a merciless world. Rilke addresses existential themes, profoundly probing the quest for individuality and the significance of death and reflecting on the experience of time as death approaches. He draws considerably on the writings of Nietzsche, whose work he came to know through Lou Andreas-Salomé. His work also incorporates impressionistic techniques that were influenced by Cézanne and Rodin (to whom Rilke was secretary in 1905–1906). He combines these techniques and motifs to conjure images of mankind's anxiety and alienation in the face of an increasingly scientific, industrial and reified world.

=== Duino Elegies ===
Rilke began writing the elegies in 1912 while a guest of Princess Marie von Thurn und Taxis (1855–1934) at Duino Castle, near Trieste on the Adriatic Sea. During this ten-year period, the elegies languished incomplete for long stretches of time as Rilke suffered frequently from severe depression, some of which was caused by the events of World War I and his conscripted military service. Aside from brief episodes of writing in 1913 and 1915, Rilke did not return to the work until a few years after the war ended. With a sudden, renewed inspiration – writing in a frantic pace he described as "a savage creative storm" – he completed the collection in February 1922 while staying at Château de Muzot in Veyras, in Switzerland's Rhône Valley. After their publication and his death shortly thereafter, the Duino Elegies were quickly recognized by critics and scholars as Rilke's most important work.

The Duino Elegies are intensely religious, mystical poems that weigh beauty and existential suffering. The poems employ a rich symbolism of angels and salvation but not in keeping with typical Christian interpretations. Rilke begins the first elegy in an invocation of philosophical despair, asking: "Who, if I cried out, would hear me among the hierarchies of angels?" (Wer, wenn ich schriee, hörte mich denn aus der Engel Ordnungen?) and later declares that "every angel is terrifying" (Jeder Engel ist schrecklich). While labelling of these poems as "elegies" would typically imply melancholy and lamentation, many passages are marked by their positive energy and "unrestrained enthusiasm". Together, the Duino Elegies are described as a metamorphosis of Rilke's "ontological torment" and an "impassioned monologue about coming to terms with human existence" discussing themes of "the limitations and insufficiency of the human condition and fractured human consciousness ... man's loneliness, the perfection of the angels, life and death, love and lovers, and the task of the poet".

=== Sonnets to Orpheus ===
With news of the death of Wera Knoop (1900–1919), his daughter's friend, Rilke was inspired to create and set to work on Sonnets to Orpheus. In 1922, between February 2 and 5, he completed the first section of 26 sonnets. For the next few days, he focused on the Duino Elegies, completing them on the evening of February 11. Immediately thereafter, he returned to work on the Sonnets and completed the following section of 29 sonnets in less than two weeks. Throughout the Sonnets, Wera is frequently referenced, both directly by name and indirectly in allusions to a "dancer" and the mythical Eurydice. Although Rilke claimed that the entire cycle was inspired by Wera, she appears as a character in only one of the poems. He insisted, however, that "Wera's own figure ... nevertheless governs and moves the course of the whole."

The sonnets' contents are, as is typical of Rilke, highly metaphorical. The character of Orpheus (whom Rilke refers to as the "god with the lyre") appears several times in the cycle, as do other mythical characters such as Daphne. There are also biblical allusions, including a reference to Esau. Other themes involve animals, peoples of different cultures, and time and death.

=== Letters to a Young Poet ===
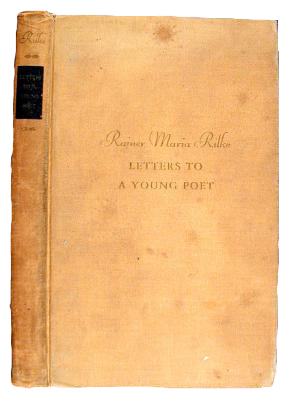
Letters to a Young Poet, cover of the 1934 edition

In 1929, writer Franz Xaver Kappus (1883–1966) published a collection of ten letters that Rilke (then aged between 27 and 32 years old) Rilke had written to him over the course of six years, beginning when Kappus was a 19-year-old officer cadet studying at the Theresian Military Academy in Wiener Neustadt, where he had a professor who had taught Rilke at the boarding Military Middleschool (Militär-Unterrealschule) in St.-Pölten more than 15 years earlier (from 1886 to 1891); (before Rilke dropped out of the officer's education after a year in Military highschool). Between 1902 and 1908, the young Kappus had written Rilke when he was uncertain about his future as a military officer or as a poet. Initially he sought Rilke's advice as to the quality of his poetry and whether he ought to pursue writing as a career. While he declined to comment much on Kappus's writings, Rilke advised Kappus on how a poet should feel, love and seek truth in trying to understand and experience the world around him and engage the world of art. These letters offer insight into the ideas and themes that appear in Rilke's poetry and his working process and were written during a key period of Rilke's early artistic development after his reputation as a poet began to be established with the publication of parts of Das Stunden-Buch (The Book of Hours) and Das Buch der Bilder (The Book of Images).

== Style and themes ==
Rilke extensively engaged with metaphors, metonymy and contradictions in his poetry and prose to convey disbelief and a crisis of faith. Figures from Greek mythology, such as Apollo, Hermes and Orpheus, recur as motifs in his poems and are depicted in original interpretations that often double as analogies for his experiences. Rilke's poems also feature figures of angels, famously described in the Duino Elegies as "terrifying" (schrecklich); he also occasionally explored the crisis of his Catholic faith, including in his little-known 1898 poem "Visions of Christ", where he depicted Mary Magdalene as the mother of Jesus' child.

=== Legacy ===
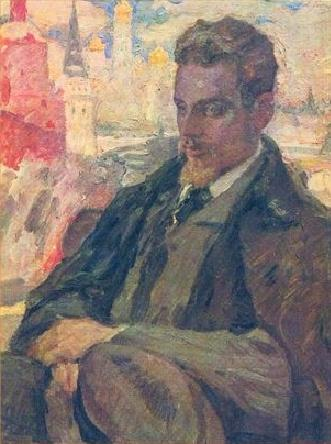
Portrait of Rilke painted two years after his death by Leonid Pasternak

Rilke is one of the best-selling poets in the United States. In popular culture, Rilke is frequently quoted or referenced in television shows, motion pictures, music and other works when these works discuss the subject of love or angels. His work is often described as "mystical" and has been quoted and referenced by self-help authors. Rilke has been reinterpreted "as a master who can lead us to a more fulfilled and less anxious life".

Rilke's work has influenced several poets and writers, including William H. Gass, Galway Kinnell, Sidney Keyes, Stephen Spender, Robert Bly, W. S. Merwin, John Ashbery, novelist Thomas Pynchon and the philosopher Hans-Georg Gadamer. British poet W. H. Auden (1907–1973) has been described as "Rilke's most influential English disciple" and he frequently "paid homage to him" or used the imagery of angels in his work.

The American rock music band Rainer Maria was named after Rilke.

== Works ==
=== Complete works ===
- Rainer Maria Rilke, Sämtliche Werke in 12 Bänden (Complete Works in 12 Volumes), published by Rilke Archive in association with Ruth Sieber-Rilke, edited by Ernst Zinn. Frankfurt am Main (1976)
- Rainer Maria Rilke, Werke (Works). Annotated edition in four volumes with supplementary fifth volume, published by Manfred Engel, Ulrich Fülleborn, Dorothea Lauterbach, Horst Nalewski and August Stahl. Frankfurt am Main and Leipzig (1996 and 2003)

=== Volumes of poetry ===
- Leben und Lieder (Life and Songs) (1894)
- Larenopfer (Offerings to the Lares) (1895)
- Traumgekrönt (Dream-Crowned) (1897)
- Advent (Advent) (1898)
- Das Stunden-Buch (The Book of Hours)
  - Das Buch vom mönchischen Leben (The Book of Monastic Life) (1899)
  - Das Buch von der Pilgerschaft (The Book of Pilgrimage) (1901)
  - Das Buch von der Armut und vom Tode (The Book of Poverty and Death) (1903)
- Das Buch der Bilder (The Book of Images) (4 parts, 1902–1906)
- Neue Gedichte (New Poems) (1907)
- Duineser Elegien (Duino Elegies) (1922)
- Sonette an Orpheus (Sonnets to Orpheus) (1922)
- The Testament (& Other Texts) (published 1974, Insel Verlag, English translation, 2025, Contra Mundum Press

=== Prose collections ===
* Geschichten vom Lieben Gott (Stories of God) (Collection of tales, 1900)
- Auguste Rodin (1903)
- Die Weise von Liebe und Tod des Cornets Christoph Rilke (Lyric story, 1906)
- Die Aufzeichnungen des Malte Laurids Brigge (The Notebooks of Malte Laurids Brigge) (Novel, 1910)

=== Letters ===
Collected letters
- Gesammelte Briefe in sechs Bänden (Collected Letters in Six Volumes), published by Ruth Sieber-Rilke and Carl Sieber. Leipzig (1936–1939)
- Briefe (Letters), published by the Rilke Archive in Weimar. Two volumes, Wiesbaden (1950, reprinted 1987 in single volume)
- Briefe in Zwei Bänden (Letters in Two Volumes) (Horst Nalewski, Frankfurt and Leipzig, 1991)
Other volumes of letters
- Briefe an Auguste Rodin (Insel Verlag, 1928)
- Briefwechsel mit Marie von Thurn und Taxis, two volumes, edited by Ernst Zinn with a foreword by Rudolf Kassner (Editions Max Niehans, 1954)
- Briefwechsel mit Thankmar von Münchhausen 1913 bis 1925 (Suhrkamp Insel Verlag, 2004)
- Briefwechsel mit Rolf von Ungern-Sternberg und weitere Dokumente zur Übertragung der Stances von Jean Moréas (Suhrkamp Insel Verlag, 2002)
- The Dark Interval – Letters for the Grieving Heart, edited and translated by Ulrich C. Baer (New York: Random House, 2018).

== See also ==
- Baladine Klossowska
- List of Austrian writers
- Notes on the Melody of Things, a posthumous translation of a work by Rilke
- Rainer Maria Rilke Foundation in Sierre, Switzerland

== Sources ==
- Freedman, Ralph (1998). Life of a Poet: Rainer Maria Rilke. New York: Northwestern University Press. ISBN 978-0-810-11543-9.
- Metzger, Erika A.; Metzger, Michael M., eds. (2001). A Companion to the Works of Rainer Maria Rilke. Camden House. ISBN 1-57113-052-7 – via Internet Archive.
- Prater, Donald A. (1986). A Ringing Glass: The Life of Rainer Maria Rilke. Oxford: Clarendon Press.
