= Klossowski =

Klossowski (feminine: Klossowska) is a Polish surname, and may refer to:

- Baladine Klossowska
- Balthazar Klossowski de Rola, the French painter Balthus
- Erich Klossowski
- "Madame Klossowski" (Loulou de la Falaise), ex-wife of Thadée Klossowski de Rola, the youngest son of Balthus
- Pierre Klossowski
- Setsuko Klossowska de Rola
