= Rainer Maria Rilke Foundation =

Swiss foundation dedicated to the Bohemian-Austrian writer

Coordinates: 46.294°N 7.537°E

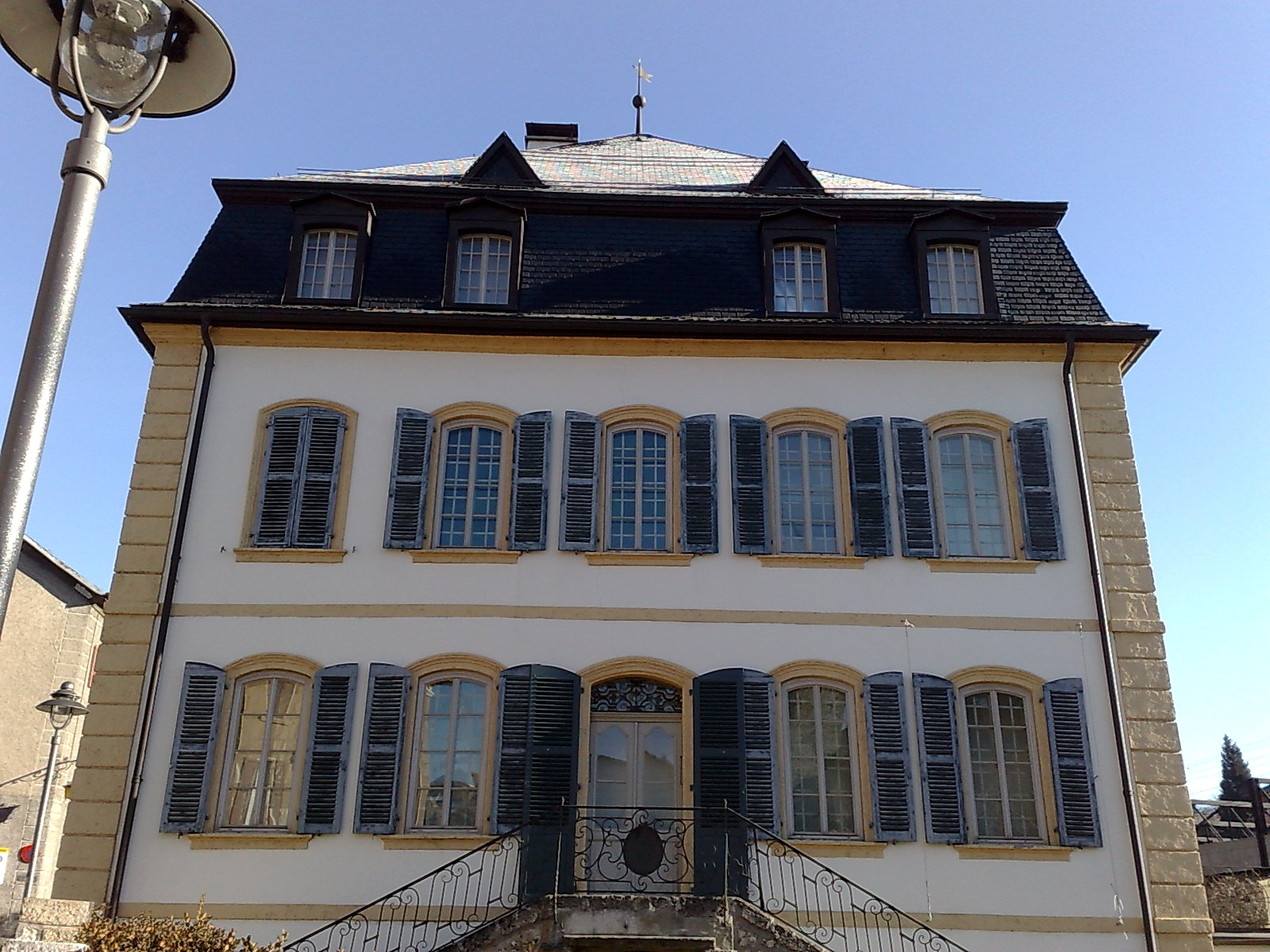
Maison de Courten, home of the Rainer Maria Rilke Foundation.

The Rainer Maria Rilke Foundation (in French: Fondation Rainer Maria Rilke) was established in 1986 in Sierre, Switzerland, on the patronage of the municipality. The foundation honors the memory of the great European poet from Prague, who lived at the Chateau de Muzot, in Veyras from 1921 to 1926. Its goal is to promote the knowledge of Rainer Maria Rilke's works, through a museum, exhibitions, lectures, conferences, publications and a festival. The famous poet spent the five last years of his life in the city, living in the Château de Muzot, a 13th-century fortified manor on the edge of town.

The building also has a library containing about 7,000 items and archives.

Since 1987, the foundation installed the museum in the Maison de Courten, built in 1769, located at the rue du Bourg 30 in Sierre.

== Festival Rilke ==
Since 2000, the foundation organizes every three years a Festival Rilke which takes place in the Château Mercier and its gardens. The program is made up of theater performances, readings, conferences, concerts, and dialogues between writers and readers. A writing workshop for children is also featured. The last festival theme, in August 2006, was "The Russian friendship : Rilke-Tsvetaïeva-Pasternak".
