= Kłosowski =

Kłosowski is Polish a surname. Notable people with the surname include:

- George Chapman (murderer) (born Seweryn Kłosowski; 1865–1903), Polish serial killer
- Dolores Klosowski (1923–2016), All-American Girls Professional Baseball League player
- John Kloss (born John Klosowski; 1937–1987), American fashion designer
- Roman Kłosowski (1929–2018), Polish actor
- Sławomir Kłosowski (born 1964), Polish politician
- Theresa Klosowski, All-American Girls Professional Baseball League player

== See also ==
- Klossowski (born Balthasar Klossowski de Rola; 1908–2001), Polish-French modern artist
- Klonowski, a surname
