= Veyras, Switzerland =

Veyras
- Former municipality
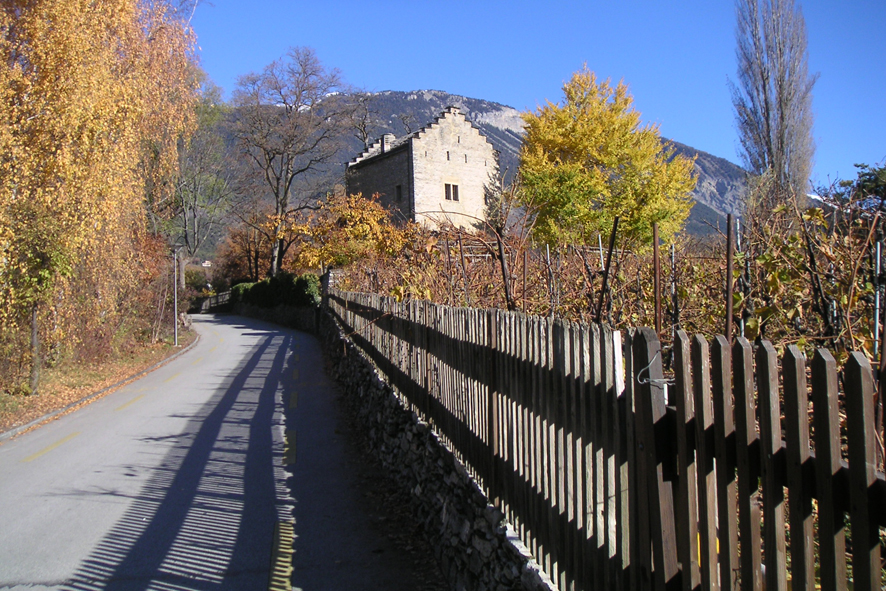
- Château de Muzot near Veyras, where poet Rainer Maria Rilke completed the Duino Elegies in 1922

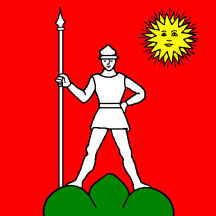
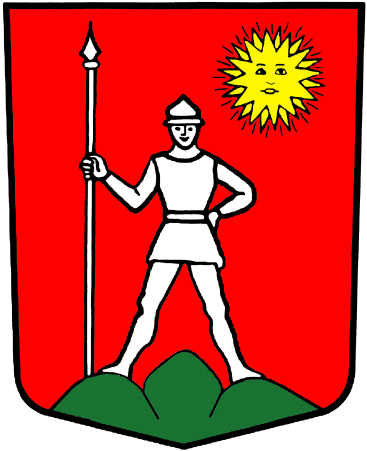
- Flag Coat of arms
- Location of Veyras
- Location within Switzerland Location within Canton of Valais
- Coordinates: 46°18′N 7°32′E
- Country: Switzerland
- Canton: Valais
- District: Sierre

Government
  - Mayor: Gérard Salamin

Area
  - Total: 1.5 km^{2} (0.58 sq mi)
- Elevation: 645 m (2,116 ft)

Population (December 2019)
  - Total: 1,839
  - Density: 1,200/km^{2} (3,200/sq mi)
- Time zone: UTC+01:00 (CET)
  - Summer (DST): UTC+02:00 (CEST)
- Postal code: 3968
- SFOS number: 6250
- ISO 3166 code: CH-VS
- Surrounded by: Miège, Salgesch, Sierre, Venthône
- Website: www.veyras.ch

Veyras (French pronunciation: [vɛʁas]) is a former municipality in the district of Sierre in the canton of Valais in Switzerland. On 1 January 2021 the former municipalities of Miège, Venthône and Veyras merged to form the new municipality of Noble-Contrée.

== Geography ==
Veyras had an area, as of 2009, of 1.5 square kilometers (0.58 mi^{2}). Of this area, 0.8 km^{2} (0.31 mi^{2}) or 55.2% is used for agricultural purposes, while 0.13 km^{2} (0.050 mi^{2}) or 9.0% is forested. Of the rest of the land, 0.48 km^{2} (0.19 mi^{2}) or 33.1% is settled (buildings or roads) and 0.04 km^{2} (9.9 acres) or 2.8% is unproductive land.

Of the built up area, housing and buildings made up 24.8% and transportation infrastructure made up 6.2%. Power and water infrastructure as well as other special developed areas made up 1.4% of the area Out of the forested land, 4.1% of the total land area is heavily forested and 4.8% is covered with orchards or small clusters of trees. Of the agricultural land, 0.0% is used for growing crops and 2.1% is pastures, while 53.1% is used for orchards or vine crops. Of the unproductive areas, 1.4% is unproductive vegetation and 1.4% is too rocky for vegetation.

== Coat of arms ==
The blazon of the municipal coat of arms is Gules, statant on Coupeaux vert a Warrior Argent holding a spear of the same, in chief sinister a Sun in Splendour Or.

== Demographics ==
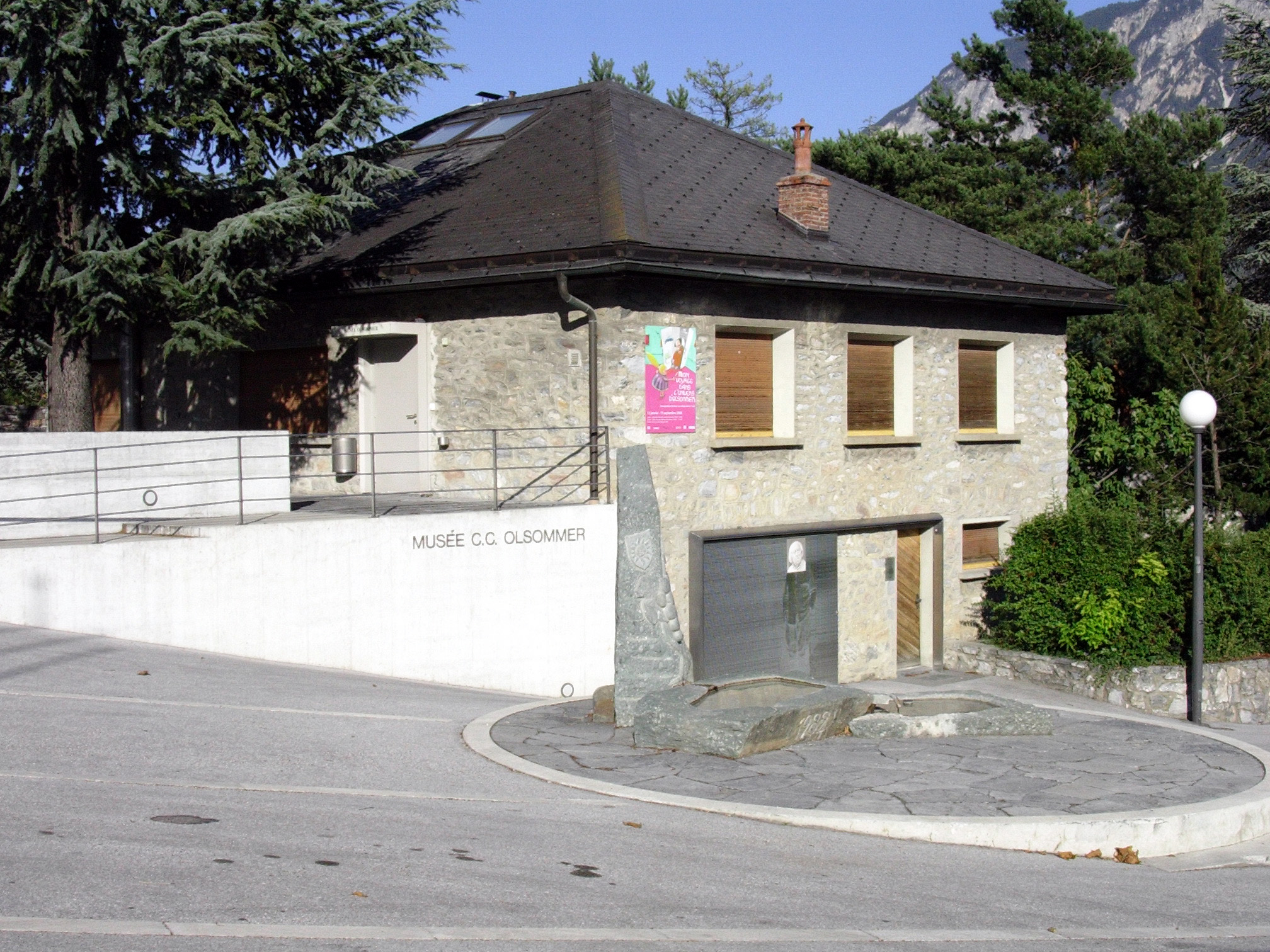
The house of Charles-Clos Olsommer now, the Veyras museum

Veyras had a population (as of 2019) of 1,839. As of 2008, 12.6% of the population are resident foreign nationals. Over the last 10 years (2000–2010 ) the population has changed at a rate of 13.7%. It has changed at a rate of 14.5% due to migration and at a rate of 1.8% due to births and deaths.

Most of the population (as of 2000) speaks French (1,196 or 84.1%) as their first language, German is the second most common (165 or 11.6%) and Italian is the third (37 or 2.6%).

As of 2008, the population was 48.9% male and 51.1% female. The population was made up of 729 Swiss men (42.1% of the population) and 117 (6.8%) non-Swiss men. There were 775 Swiss women (44.8%) and 109 (6.3%) non-Swiss women. Of the population in the municipality, 313 or about 22.0% were born in Veyras and lived there in 2000. There were 678 or 47.7% who were born in the same canton, while 199 or 14.0% were born somewhere else in Switzerland, and 185 or 13.0% were born outside of Switzerland.

As of 2000, children and teenagers (0–19 years old) make up 25.2% of the population, while adults (20–64 years old) make up 60.3% and seniors (over 64 years old) make up 14.5%.

As of 2000, there were 556 people who were single and never married in the municipality. There were 709 married individuals, 78 widows or widowers and 79 individuals who are divorced.

As of 2000, there were 568 private households in the municipality, and an average of 2.4 persons per household. There were 164 households that consist of only one person and 49 households with five or more people. In 2000, a total of 537 apartments (89.4% of the total) were permanently occupied, while 49 apartments (8.2%) were seasonally occupied and 15 apartments (2.5%) were empty. As of 2009, the construction rate of new housing units was 5.2 new units per 1000 residents. The vacancy rate for the municipality, in 2010, was 0.72%.

The historical population is given in the following chart:

== Politics ==
In the 2007 federal election the most popular party was the CVP which received 37.56% of the vote. The next three most popular parties were the SP (19.83%), the FDP (15%) and the SVP (14.81%). In the federal election, a total of 706 votes were cast, and the voter turnout was 62.0%.

In the 2009 Conseil d'État/Staatsrat election a total of 718 votes were cast, of which 67 or about 9.3% were invalid. The voter participation was 62.8%, which is much more than the cantonal average of 54.67%. In the 2007 Swiss Council of States election a total of 698 votes were cast, of which 49 or about 7.0% were invalid. The voter participation was 61.9%, which is similar to the cantonal average of 59.88%.

== Economy ==
As of 2010, Veyras had an unemployment rate of 3.4%. As of 2008, there were 26 people employed in the primary economic sector and about 11 businesses involved in this sector. 69 people were employed in the secondary sector and there were 12 businesses in this sector. 79 people were employed in the tertiary sector, with 23 businesses in this sector. There were 705 residents of the municipality who were employed in some capacity, of which females made up 44.7% of the workforce.

In 2008 the total number of full-time equivalent jobs was 126. The number of jobs in the primary sector was 14, all of which were in agriculture. The number of jobs in the secondary sector was 61 of which 35 or (57.4%) were in manufacturing and 25 (41.0%) were in construction. The number of jobs in the tertiary sector was 51. In the tertiary sector; 8 or 15.7% were in wholesale or retail sales or the repair of motor vehicles, 2 or 3.9% were in the movement and storage of goods, 16 or 31.4% were in a hotel or restaurant, 2 or 3.9% were in the information industry, 1 was the insurance or financial industry, 3 or 5.9% were technical professionals or scientists, 8 or 15.7% were in education and 3 or 5.9% were in health care.

In 2000, there were 82 workers who commuted into the municipality and 585 workers who commuted away. The municipality is a net exporter of workers, with about 7.1 workers leaving the municipality for every one entering. Of the working population, 8.8% used public transportation to get to work, and 76.3% used a private car.

== Religion ==
From the 2000 census, 1,144 or 80.5% were Roman Catholic, while 95 or 6.7% belonged to the Swiss Reformed Church. Of the rest of the population, there were 9 members of an Orthodox church (or about 0.63% of the population), and there were 40 individuals (or about 2.81% of the population) who belonged to another Christian church. There was 1 individual who was Jewish, and 7 (or about 0.49% of the population) who were Islamic. There were 5 individuals who belonged to another church. 69 (or about 4.85% of the population) belonged to no church, are agnostic or atheist, and 69 individuals (or about 4.85% of the population) did not answer the question.

== Education ==
In Veyras about 481 or (33.8%) of the population have completed non-mandatory upper secondary education, and 238 or (16.7%) have completed additional higher education (either university or a Fachhochschule). Of the 238 who completed tertiary schooling, 60.9% were Swiss men, 27.3% were Swiss women, 7.1% were non-Swiss men and 4.6% were non-Swiss women.

As of 2000, there were 2 students in Veyras who came from another municipality, while 144 residents attended schools outside the municipality.

== Notable residents ==
- Rainer Maria Rilke (1875-1926), Bohemian-Austrian poet, lived here from 1921 to 1926 and completed his Duino Elegies, a collection of ten long poems, at the Château de Muzot in 1922.
- Baladine Klossowska (1886-1969), painter, the last lover of Rainer Maria Rilke.
- Balthus (1908-2001), artist and son of Baladine Klossowska, as a child.
- Pierre Klossowski (1905-2001), artist and son of Baladine Klossowska, as a child.
