= Venthône Castle =

Castle in Noble-Contrée, Switzerland

- Noble-Contrée in Switzerland
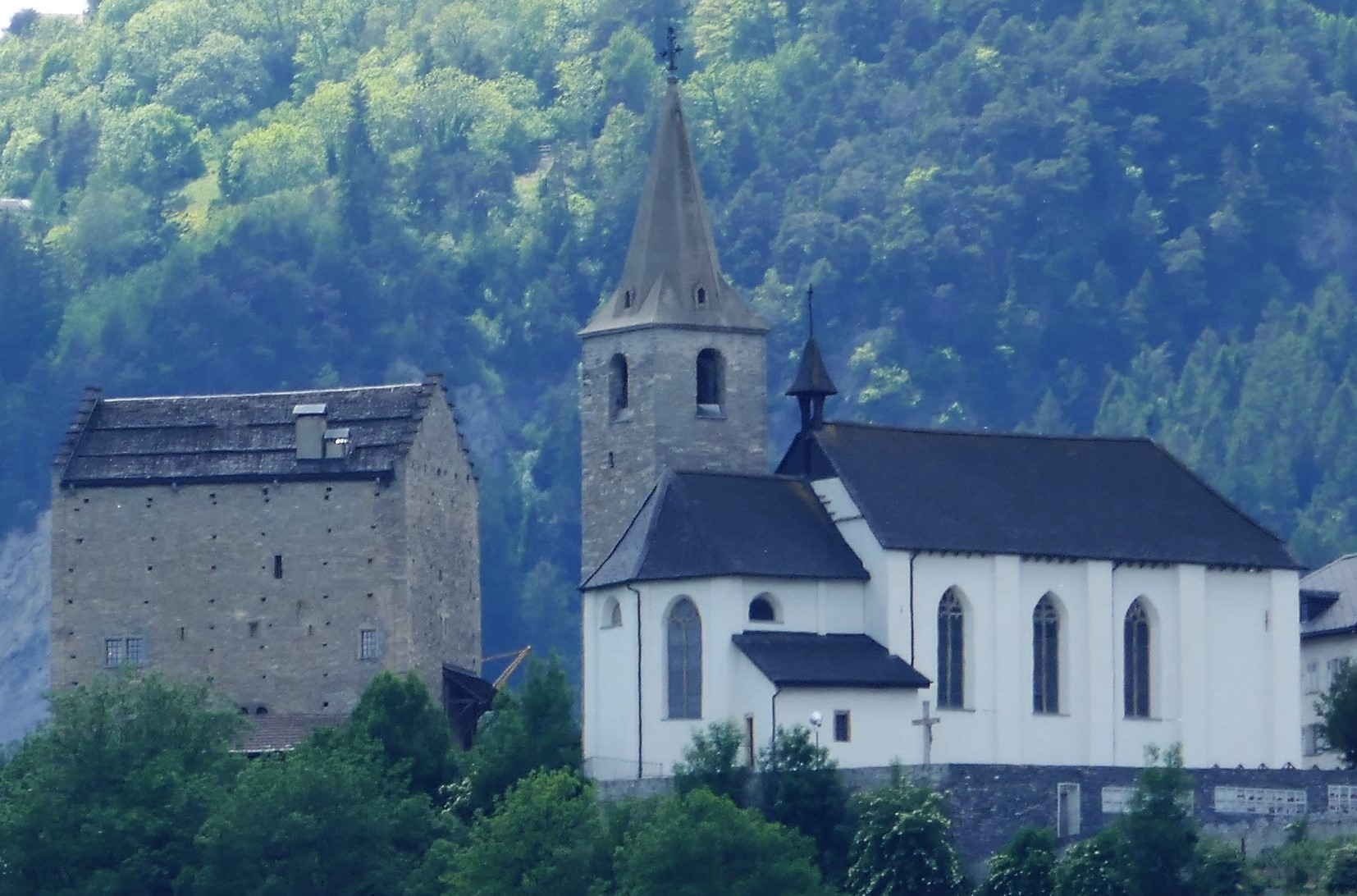
- Venthône Castle and church

Location
- Coordinates: 46°18′27″N 7°31′55″E

Site history
- Built: 13th century

Swiss Cultural Property of National Significance

Venthône Castle is a fortified tower in the village of Venthône which is part of municipality of Noble-Contrée of the Canton of Valais in Switzerland. It is a Swiss heritage site of national significance.

== History ==
The castle tower probably dates to the 13th century. The knight, Peter of Venthône, is mentioned in 1243. He played a major role in the conflict between the Bishop of Sion and Peter of Savoy. The tower is mentioned in 1268 when the child-less Peter and his wife gave their lands to William de la Tour and joined Hauterive Abbey and Maigrauge nunnery. Over the next century, the castle passed through several owners including other, related Venthône lines. By the 15th century the Venthône family had completely died out and the castle was acquired by the bishop of Sion. In 1421 it was owned by the Raron family.

In 1600 the citizens of Venthône bought the castle and began renovating it. In 1609 a large wood paneled great hall was built, with a large stove from 1619. Since that time, the castle has remained the town hall of the municipality.

== Castle site ==
The tower is a square fortified tower. Originally it had a cellar, a tall main floor, one upper floor and an attic. During the 15th century, while it was owned by the Raron family, a stepped gable roof and battlements were added. In 1609 a wooden great hall was added between the main floor and about three-quarters of the upper floor. This addition reduced the height of the main floor and required blocking up the old windows and cutting new ones in the walls.

The main entrance is located on the north-west side of the tower. It is about 2 m (6.6 ft) above ground level and was originally probably entered through a drawbridge above a moat. The stairs and entrance were rebuilt during the 15th century.

There are two cellars, the larger southern one and a smaller northern cellar which has a vaulted ceiling.

== See also ==
- List of castles in Switzerland
- Château
