= Klonowski =

Klonowski (feminine: Klonowska, plural: Klonowscy) is a surname. Notable people with the surname include:

- Ewa Klonowski (born 1946), Polish-born forensic anthropologist
- Henry Klonowski (1898–1977), American Catholic bishop
- Marta Klonowska (born 1964), Polish glass maker
- Włodzimierz Klonowski (1945–2020), Polish biomedical physicist

== See also ==
- Klonowskie Range
