= The Hypothesis of the Stolen Painting =

1978 film

- Film poster
- Directed by: Raúl Ruiz
- Written by: Raúl Ruiz; Pierre Klossowski
- Starring: Jean Rougeul
- Cinematography: Sacha Vierny
- Edited by: Patrice Royer
- Music by: Jorge Arriagada
- Distributed by: Institut national de l'audiovisuel
- Release date: September 1978
- Running time: 66 minutes
- Country: France
- Language: French

The Hypothesis of the Stolen Painting (French: L'Hypothèse du tableau volé) is a 1978 French drama film directed by Chilean filmmaker Raúl Ruiz and shot by cinematographer Sacha Vierny. The film was inspired by the themes of French writer Pierre Klossowski (1905 - 2001) and makes references to many of Klossowski's works including The Revocation of the Edict of Nantes, The Baphomet and “La Judith de Frédérique Tonnerre.” Ruiz was originally commissioned by a French TV network to make an arts documentary on Klossowski, but what emerged is this film, a parody of the art documentary. The film was featured in film festivals after its release such as the London Film Festival in 1979. Hypothesis of the Stolen Painting has been noted as one of Ruiz's masterpieces that challenges the boundaries of cinema and film theory.

== Plot ==
Hypothesis of the Stolen Painting begins with a static shot of a street which appears at first to be a still image or photograph.

The remaining scenes center around an art collector participating in a mockumentary style of interviews from a disembodied interviewer who the audience never sees. Through a large 19th-century baroque-style house and its grounds, the camera follows the collector as he guides the interviewer. The collector has six of seven canvasses by a fictional 19th-century painter called Fredéric Tonnerre (a reference to Klossowski's short story about a painter of the same name). No one knows what was in the fourth painting of the sequence because it was stolen. His quest is to recreate the missing painting through a series of connections between the other six in order to discover the meaning of the series in its entirety. To achieve this, he hires models, acquires props and rigs lighting in order to bring each of the six surviving scenes to life as tableaux vivants. The collector takes advantage of the tableaux vivants as a medium to experience aspects of the paintings that could only be materialized in three dimensions. He can then walk around each tableau, adjust lighting, move actors to different positions, and construct narratives intertextually between the tableaux.

Some of the narratives asserted by the collector include the mythological characters of Diana and Actaeon, Knights of the Templar playing chess, a scandal among Parisian nobility, and an occult ceremony involving a sacrifice similar to that of St Sebastian. He also recites the complicated plot of the novel in which the paintings were primarily conceived. He thinks traces of an esoteric cult of the Baphomet are hidden in secret codes within the pictures. As the collector explains the multitude of threads connecting each painting, the narrator questions the collector's pedantic conclusions. The collector presses on with his investigation despite the narrator's critique. Yet, without the missing painting, any overall answer eludes him, and the collector is left asking more questions than when he'd begun.

He travels back through the gallery toward the exit, slowly walking past the tableaux vivants which are now entangled and sprawled throughout the gallery. The actors playing the characters in the tableaux are having trouble keeping still; some blink and some begin to lose their balance. The collector exits through the back door of the gallery and the film ends while the camera resides in the gallery.

== Interpretation ==
"You can say The Hypothesis of the Stolen Painting is a detective film because of its riddle… In a more baroque system as in the system of Hypothesis, you don’t enjoy finding the enigma."

The opening shot introduces the audience to the themes the film will later elaborate. Michael Goddard's The Cinema of Raúl Ruiz: Impossible Cartographies poses that this film demonstrates the exploration of cinema's power of “simulacral repetition,” the ability of cinema to simulate images that extend beyond the power of repetition where repeated images build upon themselves. Or, as David Heinemann puts it, film "demonstrates how visual signs draw on, and generate other signs. Hypothesis, with its inclusion of multiple forms of reproduction, exhibits this cinematic power.

== Cast ==
- Jean Rougeul as The Collector
- Chantal Paley as Tableaux Personnel
- Jean Raynaud as Tableaux Personnel
- Daniel Grimm as Tableaux Personnel
- Isidro Romero as Tableaux Personnel
- Bernard Daillencourt as Tableaux Personnel
- Jean-Damien Thiollier as Tableaux Personnel
- Alix Comte as Tableaux Personnel
- Christian Broutin as Tableaux Personnel
- Guy Bonnafoux as Tableaux Personnel
- Tony Rödel as Tableaux Personnel (as Tony Rodel)
- Pascal Lambertini as Tableaux Personnel
- Jean Narboni as Tableaux Personnel
- Nadège Clair as Tableaux Personnel
- Jean Reno as Tableaux Personnel
- Vincent Skimenti as Tableaux Personnel (as Vincent Schimenti)
- Anne Desbois as Tableaux Personnel
- Stéphane Shandor as Personage des Tableaux

== Reception ==
This film was an "international film festival favorite" as advertised in Black Matter. It was featured in a London Film Festival review as, "the best new film" at the festival. One reviewer regards the film as “playing outside the maps of 70s theory” with an ability to link “raw fragments of human existence with the most severe or expansive kinds of experiments with form.”

In a 1984 Monthly Film Bulletin piece on the film, Thomas Elsaesser compared it to work by Peter Greenaway, Eric Rohmer and Jacques Rivette, calling it "a very literary meditation on the subject of parallel worlds, of messages disguising themselves as accidents and coincidences revealing the hand of fate. Ruiz courteously pays tribute to Jorge Luis Borges, Italo Calvino and the paranoid histories of Thomas Pynchon. But like Umberto Eco's The Name of the Rose, it is also a detective story."

Ranked #13 Best Black and White Films Since 1970 - Film Comment.
