= 59 Rivoli =

Art gallery in Paris, France

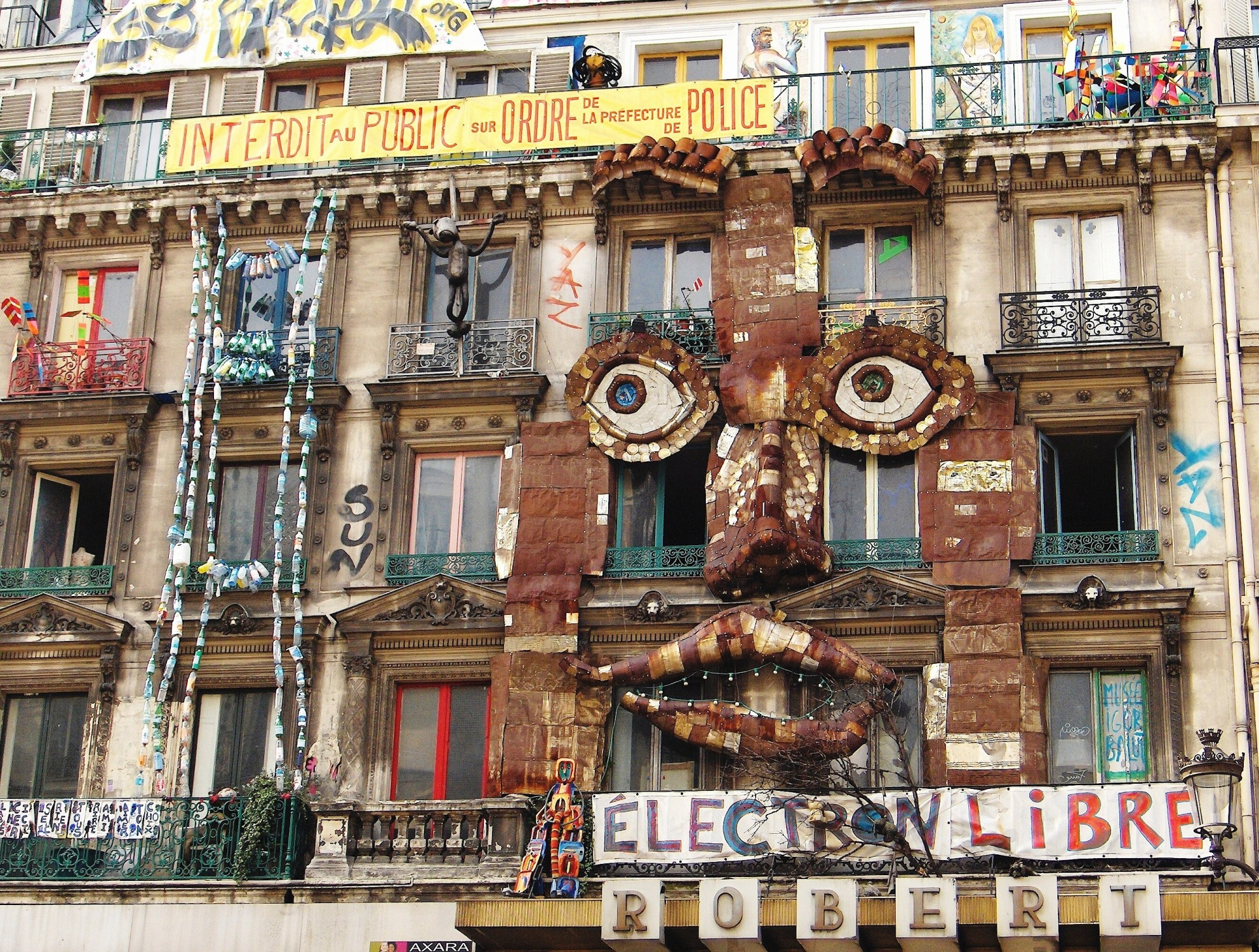
- 59 Rivoli in 2006
- Interactive map of the 59 Rivoli area

General information
- Architectural style: Haussmann's renovation of Paris
- Location: Paris, France
- Coordinates: 48.8592°N 2.3456°E

Website
- www.59rivoli.org

59 Rivoli is an art gallery in Paris, France. Formerly an artist squat that had occupied the space since 1999, it was legalized by the city from 2006 onwards. The venue became known for its parties, exhibitions, and performances.

== History ==
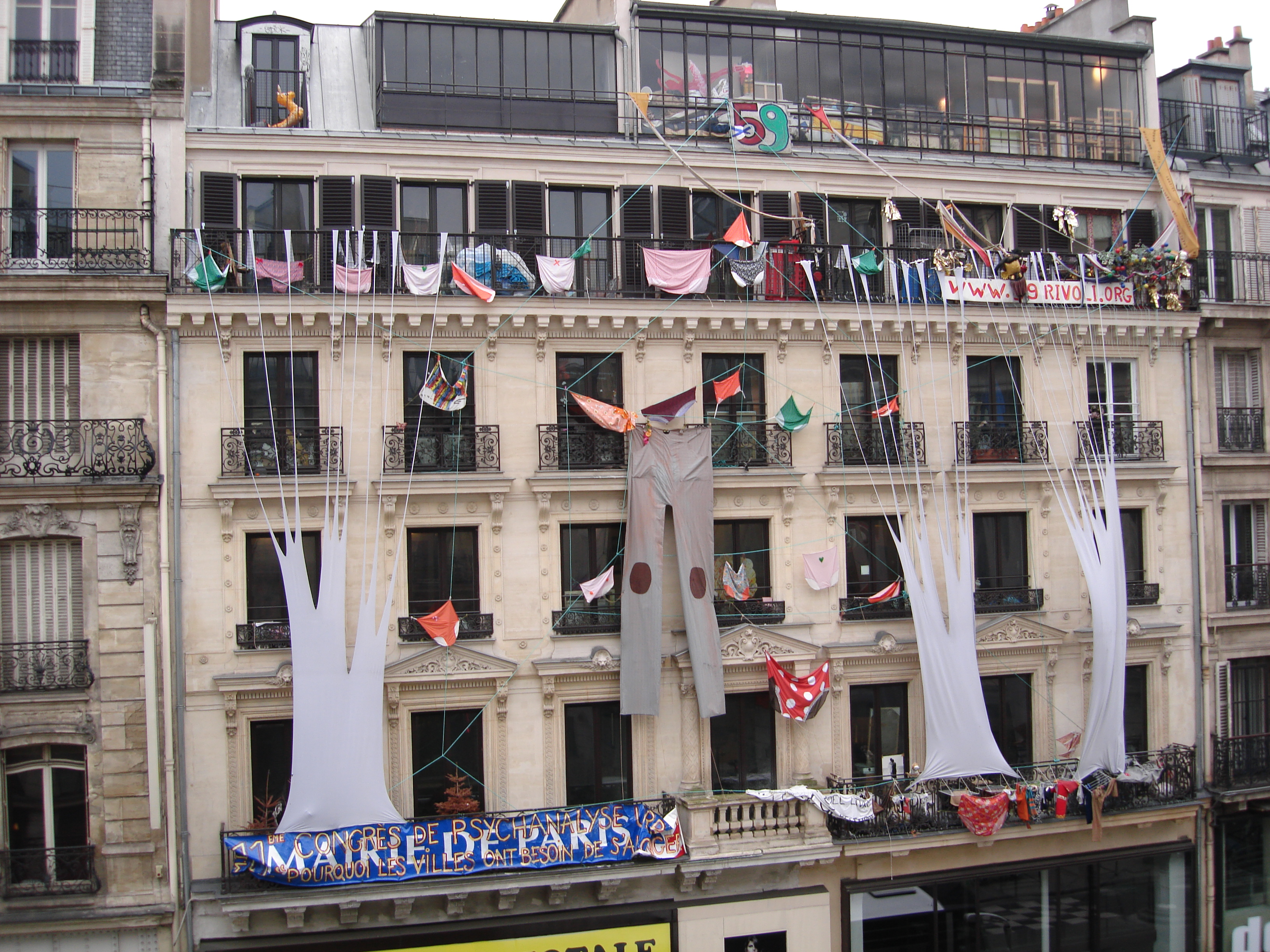
59 Rivoli in 2011

The building at 59 Rivoli was formerly a branch of the Crédit Lyonnais bank. It was abandoned for 15 years before artists took over the six-storey space and began exhibiting art and hosting parties. The building is from the Hausmannian period of urban renewal and growth in the mid-1800s. The 6 spiral staircase in the middle of the building climbs 6 floors, surrounded by brightly colored murals on the walls and floors.

In 1999, a group of artists including Gaspard Delanoë squatted the former bank building, which had been abandoned for 15 years. The Council of Paris originally planned to evict the artists but backed down when it received positive media attention. After years of 59 Rivoli being a squat, the city of Paris considered evicting the tenants. City officials discovered in 2001 that more than 40,000 people were visiting 59 Rivoli per year, and it was the third most-visited center or museum for contemporary art in the city. Paris city hall bought the building to convert it to a legal space for art studios and tourism. 59 Rivoli was the first conversion to a legal establishment by the ministry in Paris, but the project has continued since 2006.

Between 2006 and 2009, the building was renovated, opening again with 30 artist studios. As of 2019, the contemporary art gallery had 70,000 visitors per year. Artists display and sell works of various media, including paintings, sculptures, and electronic art. In the artist community in Paris, people debate whether the formally established art galleries provide more opportunities for the artists who work there or inhibit the artistic process. Other art squats in Paris include Les Frigos.
