= Noble-Contrée =

- Municipality
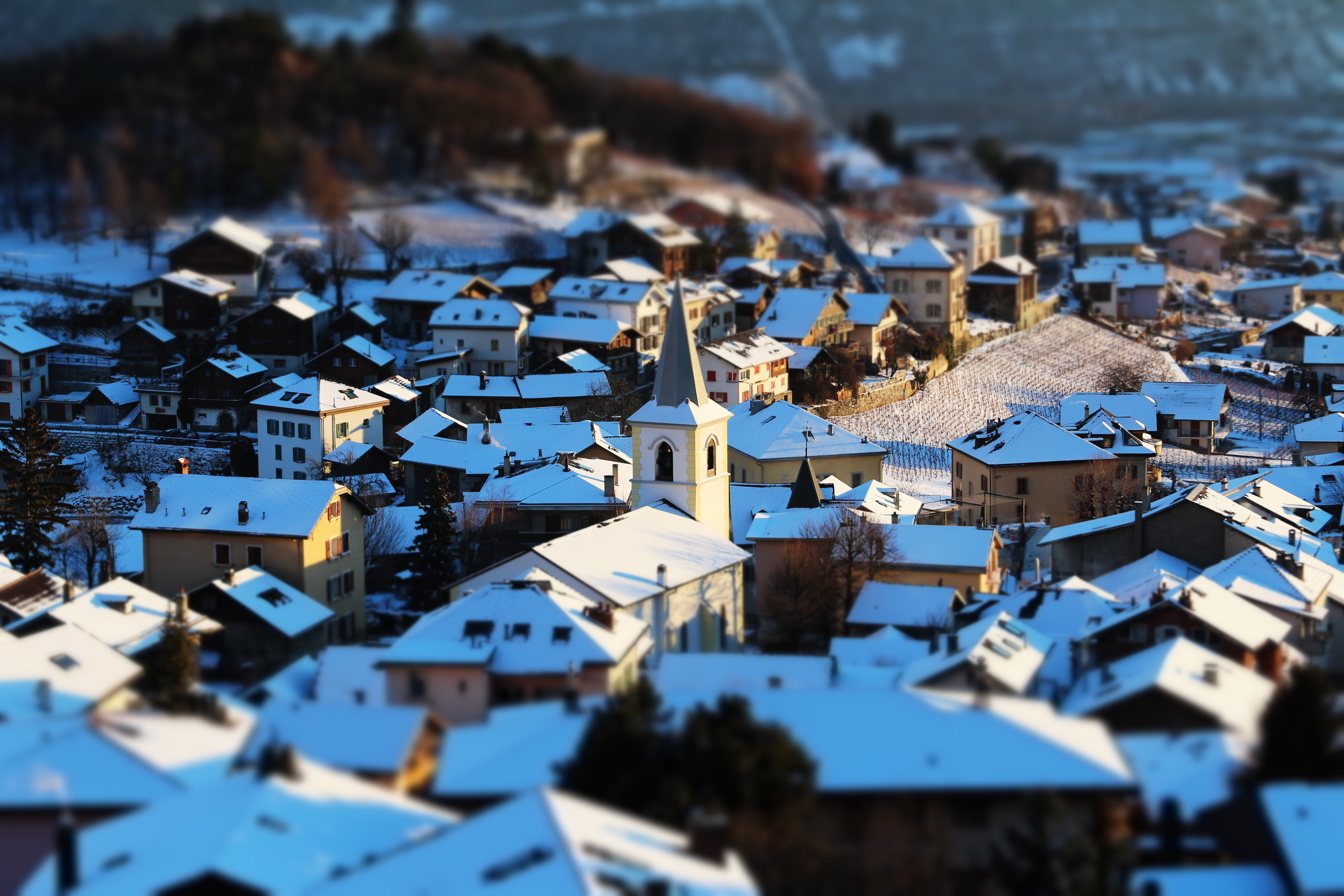
- Miège, Noble-Contrée

- Flag Coat of arms
- Location of Noble-Contrée
- Location within Switzerland Location within Canton of Valais
- Coordinates: 46°18′N 7°32′E
- Country: Switzerland
- Canton: Valais
- District: Sierre

Government
  - Mayor: président Stéphane Ganzer FDP/PRD/PLR

Area
  - Total: 6.5 km^{2} (2.5 sq mi)

Population (January 2021)
  - Total: 4,600
  - Density: 710/km^{2} (1,800/sq mi)
- Time zone: UTC+01:00 (CET)
  - Summer (DST): UTC+02:00 (CEST)
- Postal code: 3973
- SFOS number: 6254
- ISO 3166 code: CH-VS
- Surrounded by: Mollens, Randogne, Sierre
- Website: https://www.noble-contree.ch/

Noble-Contrée (French pronunciation: [nɔbl kɔ̃tʁe]) is a municipality in the district of Sierre in the canton of Valais in Switzerland. On 1 January 2021 the former municipalities of Miège, Venthône and Veyras merged to form the new municipality of Noble-Contrée.

== History ==
=== Miège ===
Miège is first mentioned in 1226 as Mieio. The municipality was formerly known by its German name Miesen, however, that name is no longer used.

=== Venthône ===
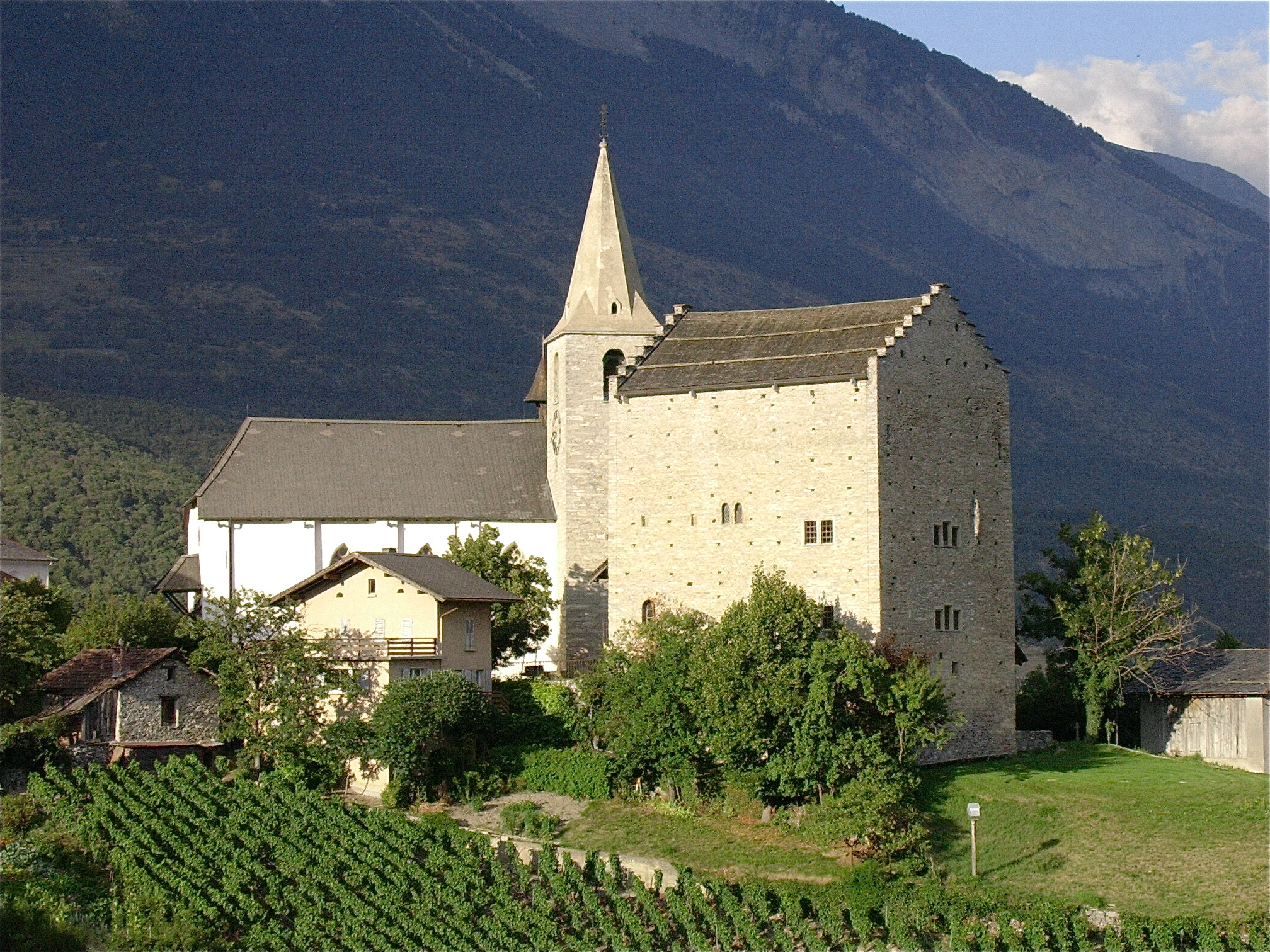
Chapel and Venthône Castle

== Geography ==
After the merger, Noble-Contrée has an area, (as of the 2004/09 survey), of 6.5 km^{2} (2.51 sq mi).

== Demographics ==
The new municipality has a population (as of December 2020) of 4,512.

== Historic Population ==
The historical population is given in the following chart:

== Heritage sites of national significance ==
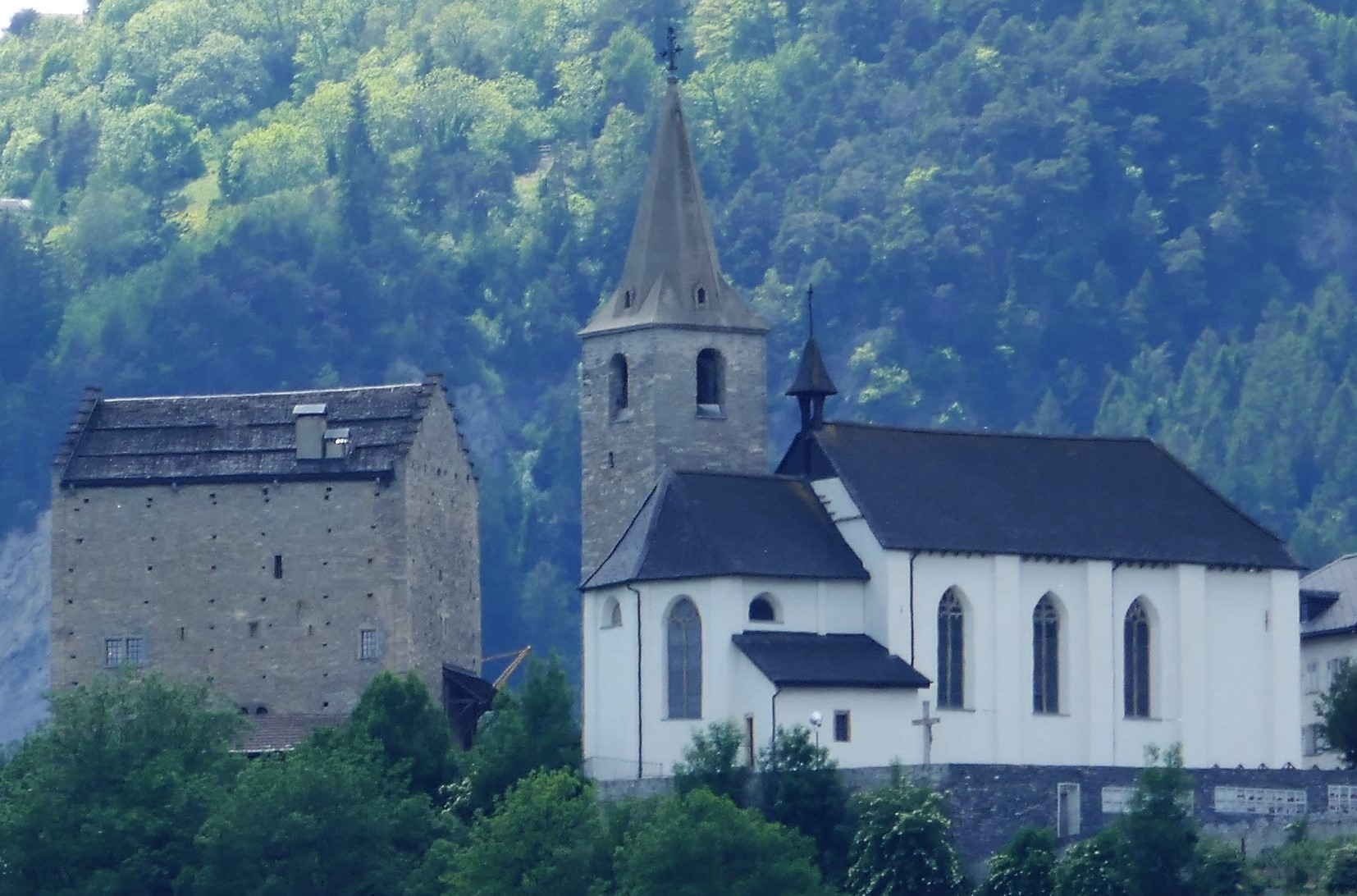
Chapel and tower in Venthône

The Tower in Venthône listed as Swiss heritage site of national significance. The entire village of Venthône is part of the Inventory of Swiss Heritage Sites.
