= Salgesch =

- Municipality
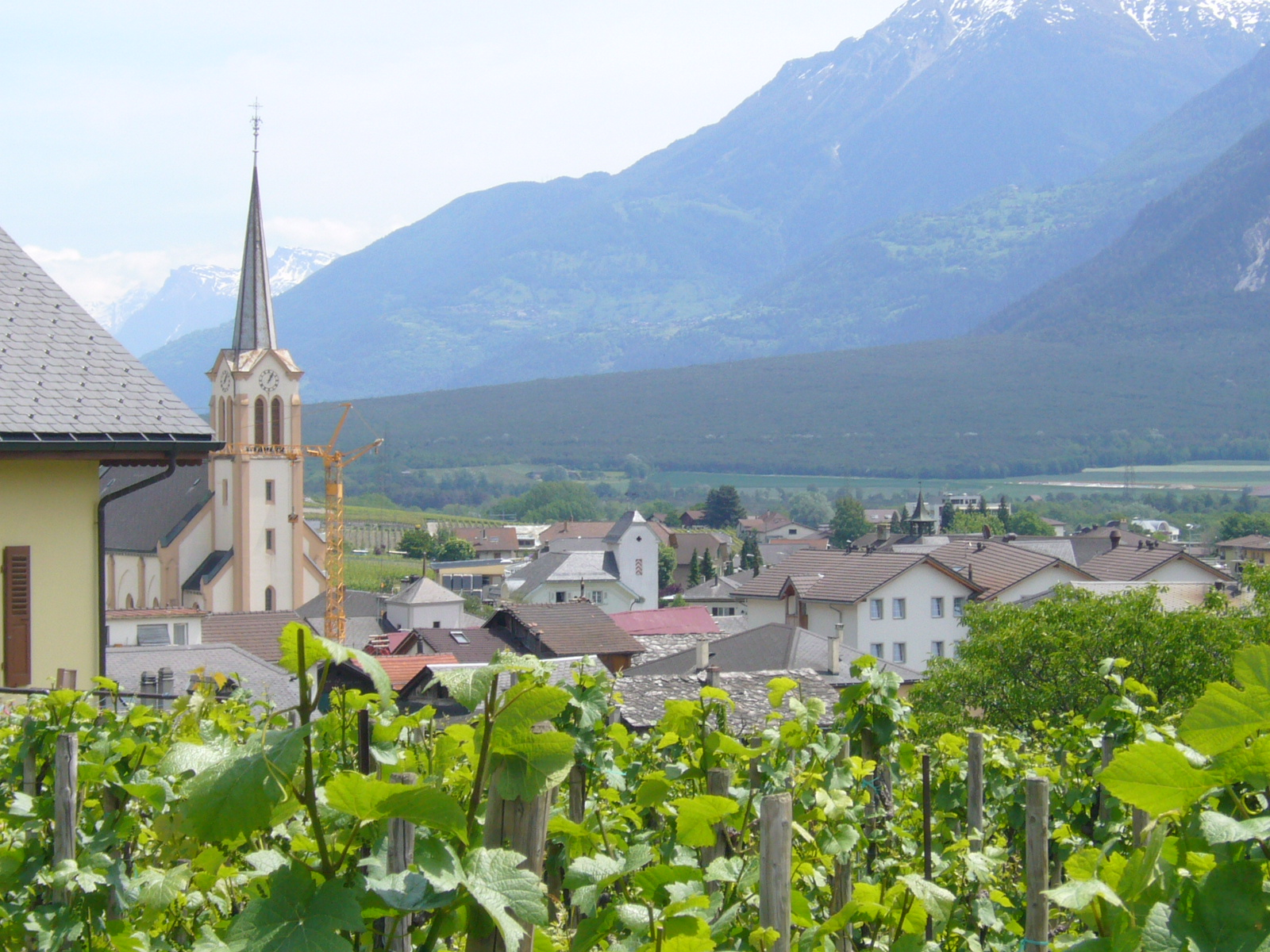

- Flag Coat of arms
- Location of Salgesch
- Location within Switzerland Location within Canton of Valais
- Coordinates: 46°18′N 7°34′E
- Country: Switzerland
- Canton: Valais
- District: Leuk

Government
  - Mayor: Urs Kuonen

Area
  - Total: 11.3 km^{2} (4.4 sq mi)
- Elevation: 581 m (1,906 ft)

Population (December 2002)
  - Total: 1,258
  - Density: 111/km^{2} (288/sq mi)
- Time zone: UTC+01:00 (CET)
  - Summer (DST): UTC+02:00 (CEST)
- Postal code: 3970
- SFOS number: 6113
- ISO 3166 code: CH-VS
- Surrounded by: Chandolin, Leuk, Miège, Mollens, Sierre, Varen, Veyras
- Website: www.salgesch.ch

Salgesch (French: Salquenen) is a municipality in the district of Leuk in the canton of Valais in Switzerland.

== History ==
Salgesch is first mentioned in the 11th Century as Salconio. In 1225 it was mentioned as Salquenum.

The transformation of Salquenen from a farming village to today's wine village began after World War II. Today, there are 203 hectares (500 acres) of vineyards and over forty wineries.

== Coat of arms ==
The blazon of the municipal coat of arms is Sable a Cross Patee Fourche Argent.

The coat of arms of Salquenen bears the Maltese Cross in memory of the Knights of St. John of Malta. In the 13th century, members of the Maltese Order settled in Salquenen and, in accordance with their beliefs, founded a lodging for pilgrims and travelers. The Knights of St. John remained in Salquenen for about 400 years.

== Geography ==
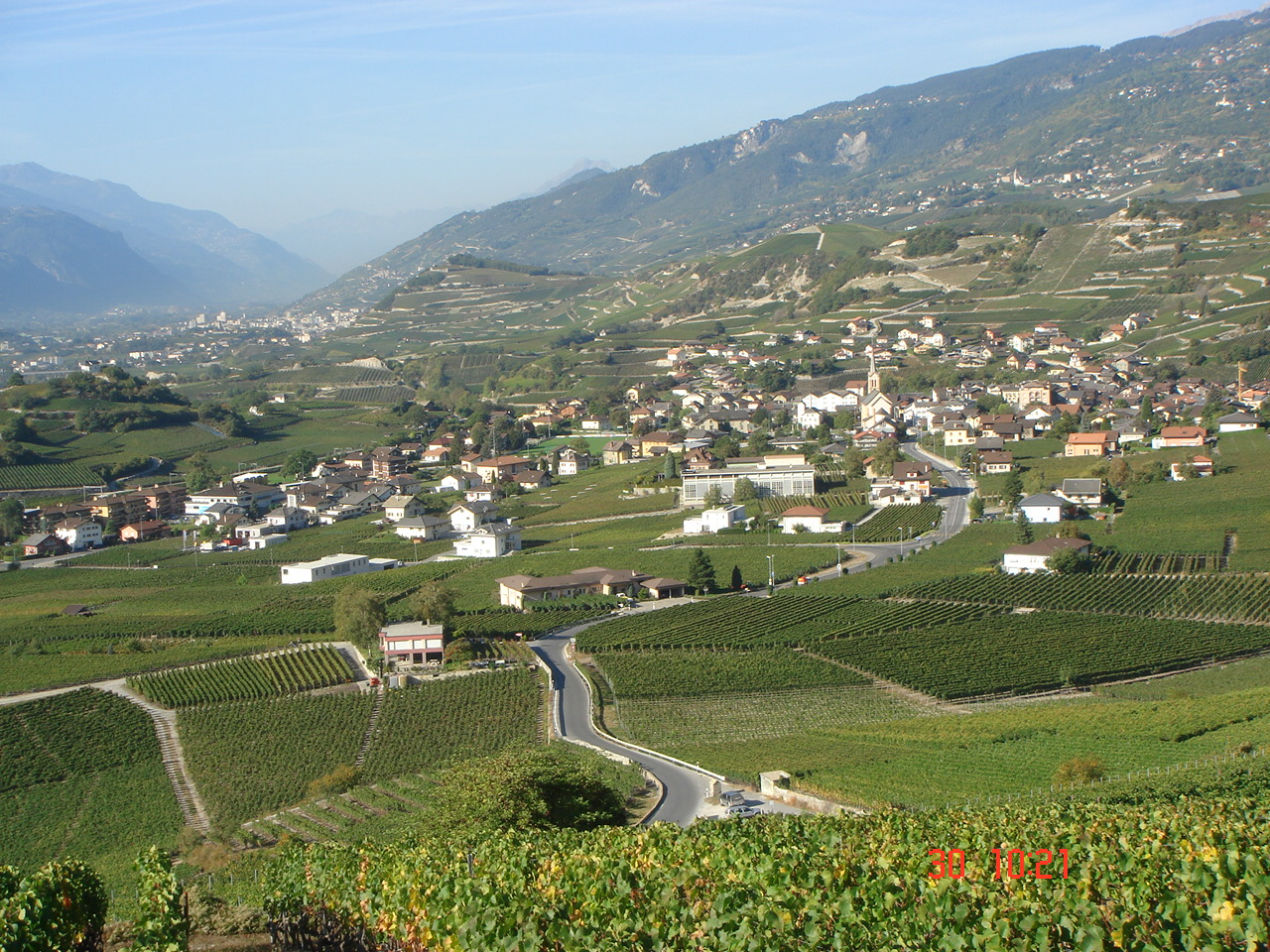
Salquenen village

Aerial view (1955)

Salgesch has an area, as of 2009, of 11.3 square kilometers (4.4 mi^{2}). Of this area, 2.42 km^{2} (0.93 mi^{2}) or 21.3% is used for agricultural purposes, while 5.72 km^{2} (2.21 mi^{2}) or 50.4% is forested. Of the rest of the land, 1.1 km^{2} (0.42 mi^{2}) or 9.7% is settled (buildings or roads), 0.37 km^{2} (0.14 mi^{2}) or 3.3% is either rivers or lakes and 1.75 km^{2} (0.68 mi^{2}) or 15.4% is unproductive land.

Of the built up area, housing and buildings made up 2.6% and transportation infrastructure made up 3.4%. Power and water infrastructure as well as other special developed areas made up 1.7% of the area while parks, green belts and sports fields made up 1.4%. Out of the forested land, 47.0% of the total land area is heavily forested and 3.4% is covered with orchards or small clusters of trees. Of the agricultural land, 0.1% is used for growing crops and 2.6% is pastures, while 18.7% is used for orchards or vine crops. Of the water in the municipality, 0.3% is in lakes and 3.0% is in rivers and streams. Of the unproductive areas, 10.6% is unproductive vegetation and 4.9% is too rocky for vegetation.

The municipality is located in the Leuk district, on the right side of the Rhone valley, across from the Pfynwald (Pfyn woods). It is the westernmost German speaking municipality in Valais.

A small water channel from medieval times runs through the municipality. It is locally known as the Mengis-Wasserleitu, Suon von Salgesch or Bisse de Mengis.

== Demographics ==
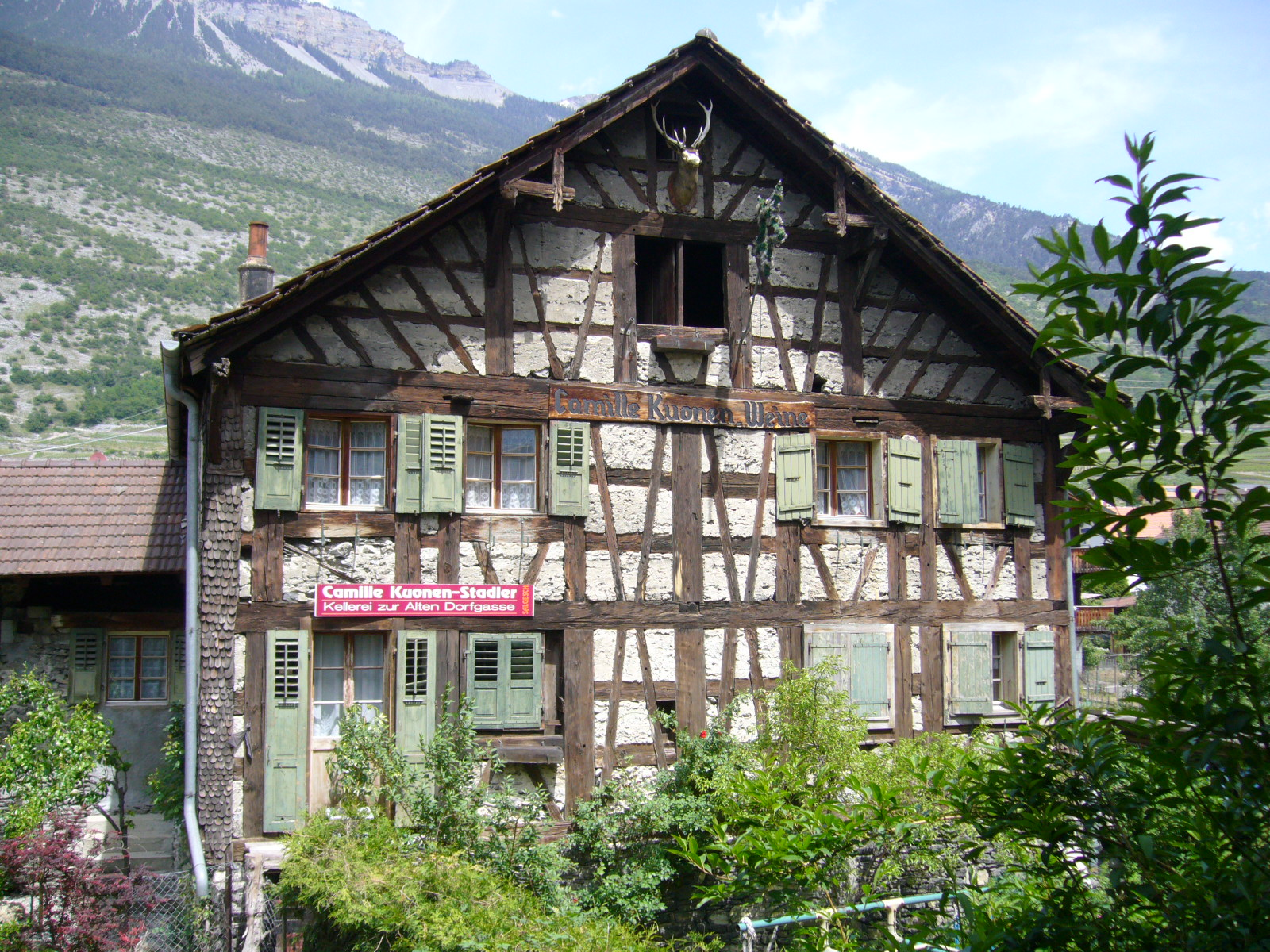
Old half-timbered house

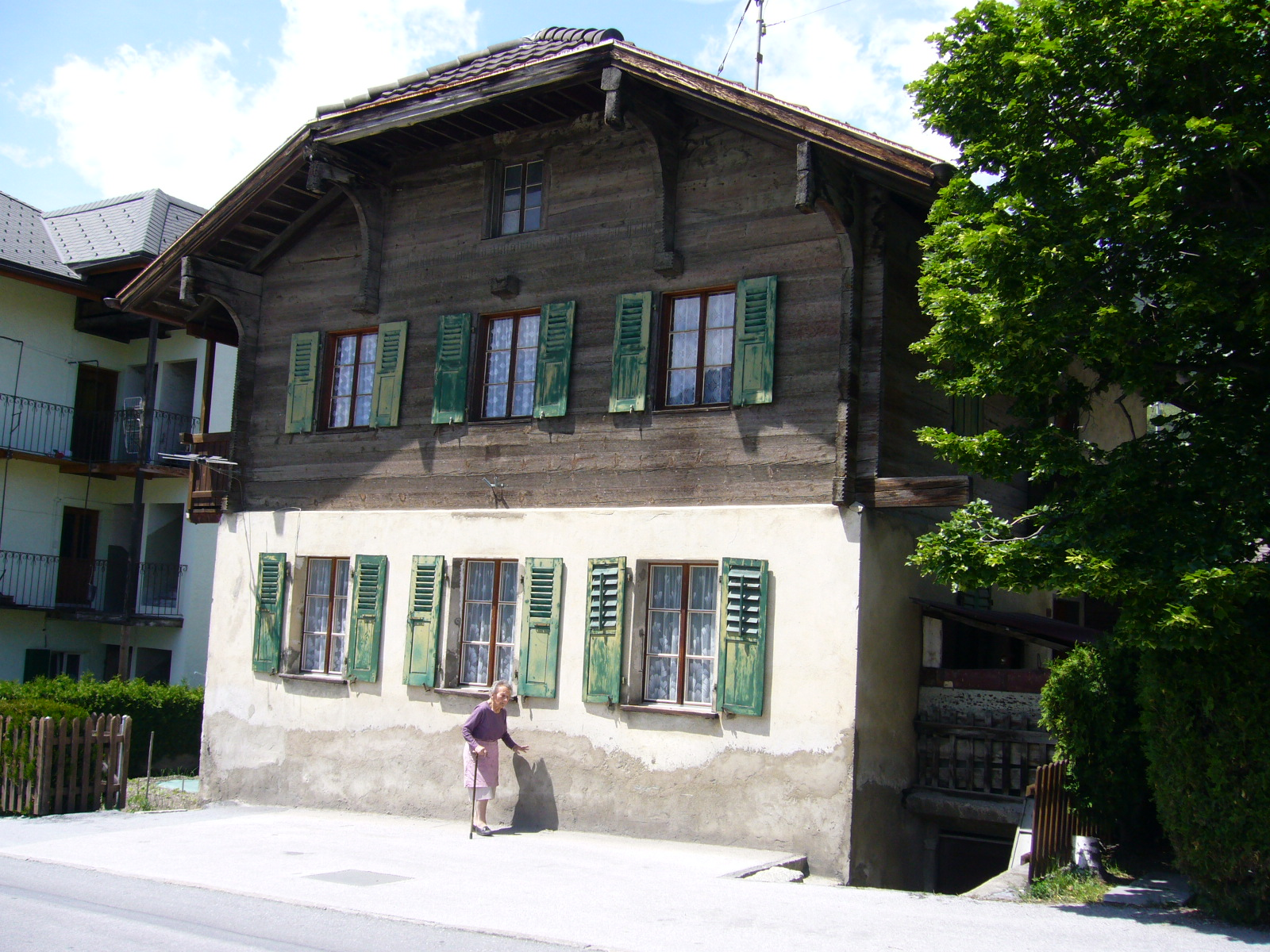
House in Salgesch

Salgesch has a population (as of December 2020) of 1,567. As of 2008, 10.1% of the population are resident foreign nationals. Over the last 10 years (1999–2009 ) the population has changed at a rate of 4.7%. It has changed at a rate of –0.2% due to migration and at a rate of 0.3% due to births and deaths.

Most of the population (as of 2000) speaks German (1,057 or 88.2%) as their first language, French is the second most common (107 or 8.9%) and Italian is the third (11 or 0.9%).

As of 2008, the gender distribution of the population was 50.9% male and 49.1% female. The population was made up of 601 Swiss men (44.6% of the population) and 85 (6.3%) non-Swiss men. There were 599 Swiss women (44.4%) and 63 (4.7%) non-Swiss women. Of the population in the municipality 748 or about 62.4% were born in Salgesch and lived there in 2000. There were 287 or 24.0% who were born in the same canton, while 68 or 5.7% were born somewhere else in Switzerland, and 56 or 4.7% were born outside of Switzerland.

The age distribution of the population (as of 2000) is children and teenagers (0–19 years old) make up 21.8% of the population, while adults (20–64 years old) make up 61.4% and seniors (over 64 years old) make up 16.8%.

As of 2000, there were 459 people who were single and never married in the municipality. There were 619 married individuals, 80 widows or widowers and 40 individuals who are divorced.

As of 2000, there were 479 private households in the municipality, and an average of 2.4 persons per household. There were 142 households that consist of only one person and 37 households with five or more people. Out of a total of 489 households that answered this question, 29.0% were households made up of just one person and there were 10 adults who lived with their parents. Of the rest of the households, there are 128 married couples without children, 169 married couples with children There were 22 single parents with a child or children. There were 8 households that were made up of unrelated people and 10 households that were made up of some sort of institution or another collective housing.

In 2000 there were 205 single family homes (or 59.8% of the total) out of a total of 343 inhabited buildings. There were 72 multi-family buildings (21.0%), along with 25 multi-purpose buildings that were mostly used for housing (7.3%) and 41 other use buildings (commercial or industrial) that also had some housing (12.0%).

In 2000, a total of 436 apartments (85.3% of the total) were permanently occupied, while 56 apartments (11.0%) were seasonally occupied and 19 apartments (3.7%) were empty. As of 2009, the construction rate of new housing units was 3.7 new units per 1000 residents. The vacancy rate for the municipality, in 2010, was 1.28%.

The historical population is given in the following chart:

== Politics ==
In the 2007 federal election the most popular party was the CVP which received 68.06% of the vote. The next three most popular parties were the SVP (17.94%), the SP (9.27%) and the FDP (2.77%). In the federal election, a total of 711 votes were cast, and the voter turnout was 73.6%.

In the 2009 Conseil d'État/Staatsrat election a total of 788 votes were cast, of which 32 or about 4.1% were invalid. The voter participation was 82.8%, which is much more than the cantonal average of 54.67%. In the 2007 Swiss Council of States election a total of 706 votes were cast, of which 52 or about 7.4% were invalid. The voter participation was 73.1%, which is much more than the cantonal average of 59.88%.

== Economy ==
As of 2010, Salgesch had an unemployment rate of 2.4%. As of 2008, there were 223 people employed in the primary economic sector and about 100 businesses involved in this sector. 300 people were employed in the secondary sector and there were 25 businesses in this sector. 213 people were employed in the tertiary sector, with 47 businesses in this sector. There were 586 residents of the municipality who were employed in some capacity, of which females made up 35.0% of the workforce.

In 2008 the total number of full-time equivalent jobs was 569. The number of jobs in the primary sector was 122, all of which were in agriculture. The number of jobs in the secondary sector was 274 of which 112 or (40.9%) were in manufacturing and 151 (55.1%) were in construction. The number of jobs in the tertiary sector was 173. In the tertiary sector; 79 or 45.7% were in wholesale or retail sales or the repair of motor vehicles, 21 or 12.1% were in the movement and storage of goods, 32 or 18.5% were in a hotel or restaurant, 2 or 1.2% were the insurance or financial industry, 10 or 5.8% were technical professionals or scientists, 9 or 5.2% were in education.

In 2000, there were 232 workers who commuted into the municipality and 331 workers who commuted away. The municipality is a net exporter of workers, with about 1.4 workers leaving the municipality for every one entering. Of the working population, 11.9% used public transportation to get to work, and 56.7% used a private car.

== Religion ==
From the 2000 census, 1,095 or 91.4% were Roman Catholic, while 28 or 2.3% belonged to the Swiss Reformed Church. Of the rest of the population, there were 14 members of an Orthodox church (or about 1.17% of the population), and there was 1 individual who belongs to another Christian church. There were 7 (or about 0.58% of the population) who were Islamic. There were 2 individuals who were Buddhist. 24 (or about 2.00% of the population) belonged to no church, are agnostic or atheist, and 27 individuals (or about 2.25% of the population) did not answer the question.

== Education ==
In Salgesch about 407 or (34.0%) of the population have completed non-mandatory upper secondary education, and 83 or (6.9%) have completed additional higher education (either university or a Fachhochschule). Of the 83 who completed tertiary schooling, 69.9% were Swiss men, 21.7% were Swiss women.

During the 2010–2011 school year there were a total of 128 students in the Salgesch school system. The education system in the Canton of Valais allows young children to attend one year of non-obligatory Kindergarten. During that school year, there 2 kindergarten classes (KG1 or KG2) and 25 kindergarten students. The canton's school system requires students to attend six years of primary school. In Salgesch there were a total of 8 classes and 128 students in the primary school. The secondary school program consists of three lower, obligatory years of schooling (orientation classes), followed by three to five years of optional, advanced schools. All the lower and upper secondary students from Salgesch attend their school in a neighboring municipality.

As of 2000, there were 66 students from Salgesch who attended schools outside the municipality.

== Grand Cru de Salquenen ==
Grand Cru de Salquenen is a wine produced only in the municipality.

Salquenen's wine producers are extremely strict and the requirements of the label are rigorous. Grape production is limited to 800 grams per square metre.

The sugar content of Grand Cru grapes must be above 96° Oechsle. In addition, only grapes cultivated according to the methods of the integrated production are admitted. Sugar adding, blending or maturing in barrels is strictly forbidden.

The wines must age in the producers’ cellars for at least 15 months before being presented to a national wine-tasting commission. A wine can be called Grand Cru only if it is awarded 18 out of 20 points and will then be decorated with the golden label of the municipality of Salquenen.

== Events in and around Salquenen ==
There are a variety of wine-related activities in and around Salquenen, including; a wine trail, the Green Lizard or Domaine de la Doline where landowners put a quarter of their terrain to provide living space to rare types of vegetation and endangered species, wine symposiums, VINEA: The Valaisan wine meeting and vine to the cellar activities that educate on the steps involved in changing grapes into wine.
