= Miège =

- Former municipality
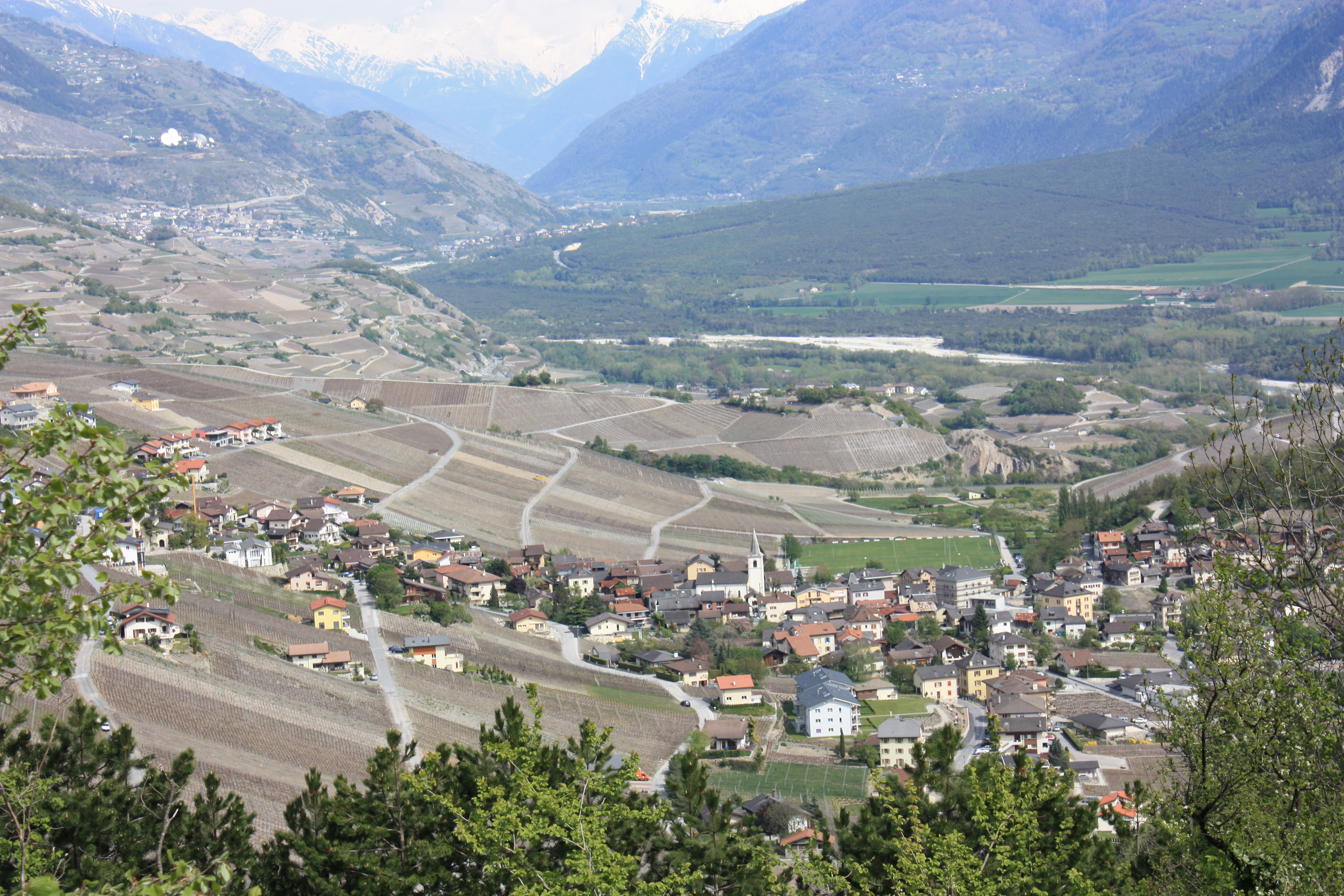
- Miège village

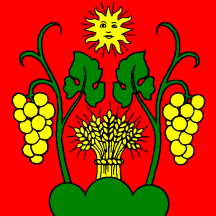
- Flag Coat of arms
- Location of Miège
- Location within Switzerland Location within Canton of Valais
- Coordinates: 46°19′N 7°33′E
- Country: Switzerland
- Canton: Valais
- District: Sierre

Government
  - Mayor: Dany Antille

Area
  - Total: 2.5 km^{2} (0.97 sq mi)
- Elevation: 702 m (2,303 ft)

Population (December 2019)
  - Total: 1,376
  - Density: 550/km^{2} (1,400/sq mi)
- Time zone: UTC+01:00 (CET)
  - Summer (DST): UTC+02:00 (CEST)
- Postal code: 3972
- SFOS number: 6241
- ISO 3166 code: CH-VS
- Surrounded by: Mollens, Salgesch, Venthône, Veyras
- Website: www.miege.ch

Miège (French pronunciation: [mjɛʒ]) is a former municipality in the district of Sierre in the canton of Valais in Switzerland. On 1 January 2021 the former municipalities of Miège, Venthône and Veyras merged to form the new municipality of Noble-Contrée.

== History ==
Miège is first mentioned in 1226 as Mieio. The municipality was formerly known by its German name Miesen, however, that name is no longer used.

== Geography ==
Miège had an area, as of 2009, of 2.5 square kilometers (0.97 mi^{2}). Of this area, 1.13 km^{2} (0.44 mi^{2}) or 44.7% is used for agricultural purposes, while 0.93 km^{2} (0.36 mi^{2}) or 36.8% is forested. Of the rest of the land, 0.43 km^{2} (0.17 mi^{2}) or 17.0% is settled (buildings or roads), 0.01 km^{2} (2.5 acres) or 0.4% is either rivers or lakes and 0.04 km^{2} (9.9 acres) or 1.6% is unproductive land.

Of the built up area, housing and buildings made up 6.7% and transportation infrastructure made up 8.3%. while parks, green belts and sports fields made up 1.6%. Out of the forested land, 34.0% of the total land area is heavily forested and 2.8% is covered with orchards or small clusters of trees. Of the agricultural land, 0.0% is used for growing crops and 4.3% is pastures, while 40.3% is used for orchards or vine crops. All the water in the municipality is flowing water.

The former municipality is located in the Sierre district, in the vineyards on the right bank of the Rhone. It is west of the Raspille river, which is the border with the German speaking Upper Valais. It consists of the haufendorf village (an irregular, unplanned and quite closely packed village, built around a central square) of Miège.

Aerial view (1949)

== Coat of arms ==
The blazon of the municipal coat of arms is Gules, issuant from Coupeaux Vert a Garb Or between two vines of the second fructed of the third, in chief a Sun in Splendour of the last.

== Demographics ==
Miège had a population (as of 2019) of 1,376. As of 2008, 12.7% of the population are resident foreign nationals.

Over the last 10 years (2000–2010 ) the population has changed at a rate of 31.1%. It has changed at a rate of 20.9% due to migration and at a rate of 7.2% due to births and deaths.

Most of the population (as of 2000) speaks French (782 or 85.7%) as their first language, German is the second most common (80 or 8.8%) and Serbo-Croatian is the third (14 or 1.5%). There are 11 people who speak Italian.

As of 2008, the population was 46.1% male and 53.9% female. The population was made up of 472 Swiss men (39.4% of the population) and 80 (6.7%) non-Swiss men. There were 568 Swiss women (47.4%) and 78 (6.5%) non-Swiss women. Of the population in the municipality, 390 or about 42.7% were born in Miège and lived there in 2000. There were 282 or 30.9% who were born in the same canton, while 101 or 11.1% were born somewhere else in Switzerland, and 104 or 11.4% were born outside of Switzerland.

As of 2000, children and teenagers (0–19 years old) make up 25.5% of the population, while adults (20–64 years old) make up 59.9% and seniors (over 64 years old) make up 14.6%.

As of 2000, there were 365 people who were single and never married in the municipality. There were 465 married individuals, 50 widows or widowers and 33 individuals who are divorced.

As of 2000, there were 359 private households in the municipality, and an average of 2.5 persons per household. There were 102 households that consist of only one person and 33 households with five or more people. In 2000, a total of 335 apartments (87.9% of the total) were permanently occupied, while 34 apartments (8.9%) were seasonally occupied and 12 apartments (3.1%) were empty. As of 2009, the construction rate of new housing units was 3.3 new units per 1000 residents. The vacancy rate for the municipality, in 2010, was 1.39%.

The historical population is given in the following chart:

== Politics ==
In the 2007 federal election the most popular party was the CVP which received 37.08% of the vote. The next three most popular parties were the SP (18.44%), the FDP (17.7%) and the SVP (12.04%). In the federal election, a total of 457 votes were cast, and the voter turnout was 60.1%.

In the 2009 Conseil d'État/Staatsrat election a total of 503 votes were cast, of which 33 or about 6.6% were invalid. The voter participation was 63.8%, which is much more than the cantonal average of 54.67%. In the 2007 Swiss Council of States election a total of 451 votes were cast, of which 26 or about 5.8% were invalid. The voter participation was 59.7%, which is similar to the cantonal average of 59.88%.

== Economy ==
As of 2010, Miège had an unemployment rate of 4.6%. As of 2008, there were 85 people employed in the primary economic sector and about 51 businesses involved in this sector. 56 people were employed in the secondary sector and there were 9 businesses in this sector. 72 people were employed in the tertiary sector, with 17 businesses in this sector. There were 432 residents of the municipality who were employed in some capacity, of which females made up 42.6% of the workforce.

In 2008 the total number of full-time equivalent jobs was 137. The number of jobs in the primary sector was 40, all of which were in agriculture. The number of jobs in the secondary sector was 51 of which 10 or (19.6%) were in manufacturing and 40 (78.4%) were in construction. The number of jobs in the tertiary sector was 46. In the tertiary sector; 14 or 30.4% were in wholesale or retail sales or the repair of motor vehicles, 2 or 4.3% were in the movement and storage of goods, 4 or 8.7% were the insurance or financial industry, 4 or 8.7% were technical professionals or scientists, 14 or 30.4% were in education and 1 was in health care.

In 2000, there were 31 workers who commuted into the municipality and 319 workers who commuted away. The municipality is a net exporter of workers, with about 10.3 workers leaving the municipality for every one entering. Of the working population, 4.9% used public transportation to get to work, and 76.2% used a private car.

== Religion ==
From the 2000 census, 737 or 80.7% were Roman Catholic, while 45 or 4.9% belonged to the Swiss Reformed Church. Of the rest of the population, there were 15 members of an Orthodox church (or about 1.64% of the population), and there were 50 individuals (or about 5.48% of the population) who belonged to another Christian church. There was 1 individual who was Islamic. There was 1 person who was Buddhist, 4 individuals who were Hindu and 8 individuals who belonged to another church. 39 (or about 4.27% of the population) belonged to no church, are agnostic or atheist, and 38 individuals (or about 4.16% of the population) did not answer the question.

== Education ==
In Miège about 328 or (35.9%) of the population have completed non-mandatory upper secondary education, and 105 or (11.5%) have completed additional higher education (either university or a Fachhochschule). Of the 105 who completed tertiary schooling, 58.1% were Swiss men, 26.7% were Swiss women, 6.7% were non-Swiss men and 8.6% were non-Swiss women.

As of 2000, there were 7 students in Miège who came from another municipality, while 76 residents attended schools outside the municipality.
