= Les Frigos =

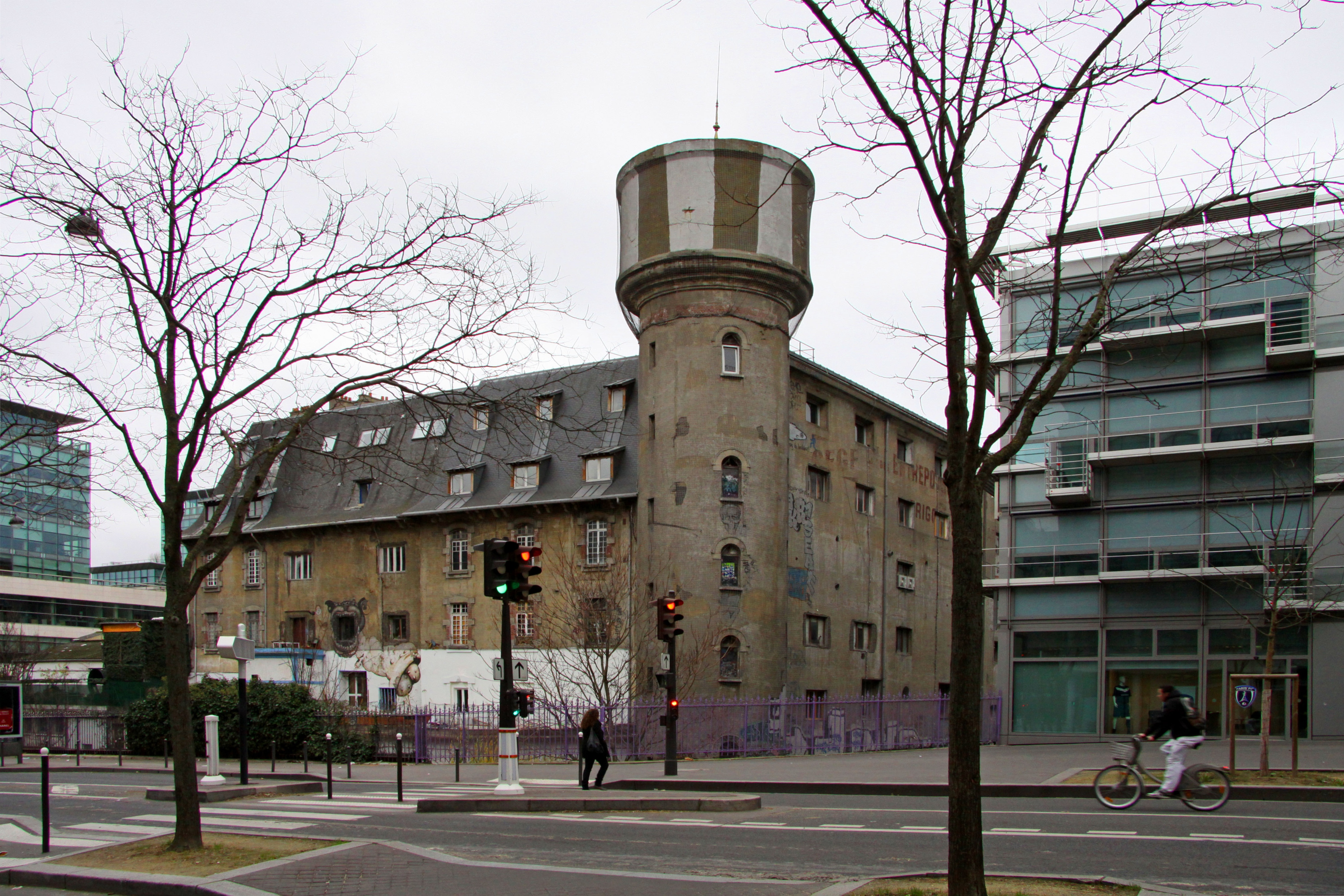
- View of Les Frigos in 2012

General information
- Location: 19 rue des Frigos, Paris, France
- Coordinates: 48.8314°N 2.3789°E

Website
- www.les-frigos.fr

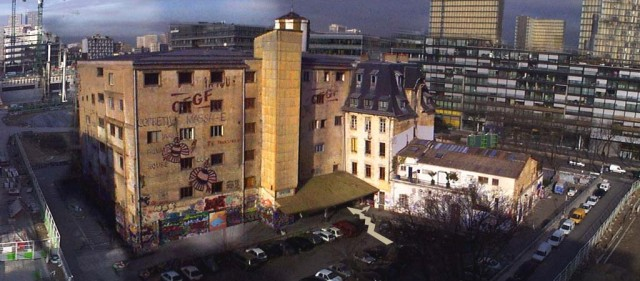
Alternative aerial view of Les Frigos

Les Frigos is an arts centre located at 19 rue des Frigos in the 13th arrondissement of Paris, France. The large building is a former refrigerated storage depot built in 1920. It was squatted in 1985 and later legalized.

== History ==
Les Frigos is located in the 13th arrondissement of Paris. Originally a refrigerated storage depot built in 1920, it became derelict in 1971, following the move of the main food market from Les Halles to the new International Market at Rungis.

In 1985, a collective of artists squatted the derelict building. The number of rooms and also the sound-proofing were attractive for the new occupants, who numbered around 250 people as of 2013. The artists set up a foundation and began to pay rent to the owner SNCF. They also set up an organisation called "91 Quai de la Gare" which engages with other local residents and projects to contest the gentrification of the area by the Paris Rive Gauche development.

Other artist squats in Paris include 59 Rivoli.

== Occupants ==
Over a hundred tenants work on the site, which includes ninety workshops. In 2010, rents for the premises equipped by the tenants ranged from around €500 to €2,700. Fifteen different professions carry out activities at Les Frigos, ranging from small firms to publishing houses, arts and crafts, etc. There are artists (notable residents include sculptor Jean-Paul Réti, micro-companies and associations for managing rehearsal facilities for theatrical people or for musicians.
