= Jean-Paul Réti =

French sculptor

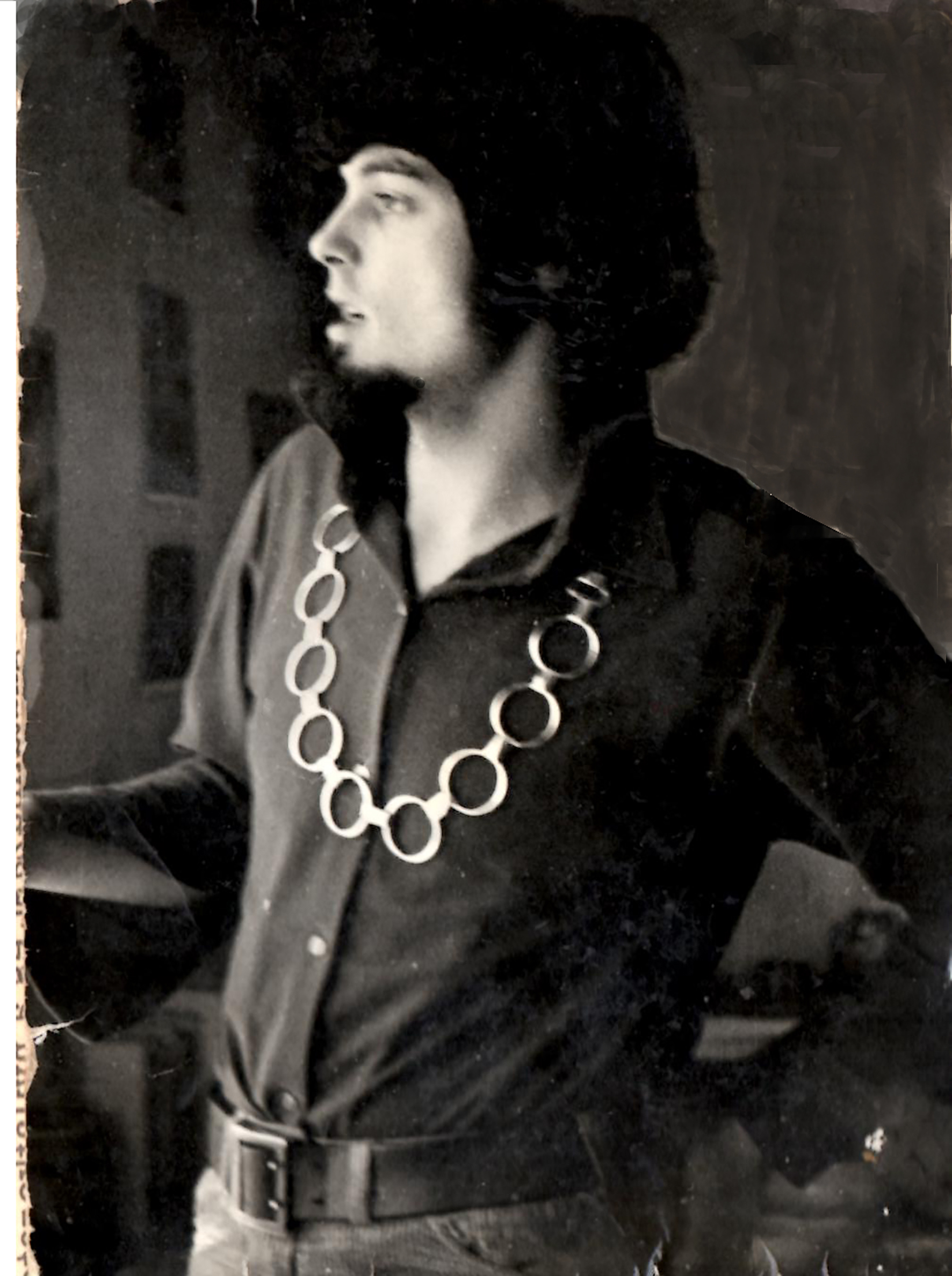
- Born: Jean-Paul Reti; 1946 (age 79–80); Brașov, Romania
- Known for: Sculpting

Jean-Paul Réti (alternative spelling: Jean-Paul Reti) is an artist and sculptor of French and Hungarian descent, established in France.

== Biography ==
Jean-Paul Réti, born in 1946 in Brașov, Romania, spent part of his school years in Budapest, Hungary, before establishing in Paris, France, in the late 1960s. There, he became a student at Beaux-Arts de Paris, under the supervision of noted French sculptor César. In the 1970s, he developed commissioned sculpture work for artists such as Fernando Botero, Jean-Michel Folon, Jean Dubuffet and Pierre Klossowski. He became a resident of the French Academy in Rome at the Villa Medici from 1978 to 1980, and a recipient of the Prix de Rome. In 1985, he established his workshop permanently in Les Frigos, a squatting art space in Paris, France.

== Work ==
Inspired by urban life, by radical anarchist political views, and also by botanic phenomena (e.g. roots) and environmental dynamics, the art of Jean-Paul Réti has been often compared to that of the Nouveaux Réalistes, especially through its connections to the work of César Baldaccini. He uses a wide range of sculpting materials, most notably steel, also vegetable fibre. His work features in reputable collections, including the François Pinault Collection.
