= Ewa Klonowski =

Polish-Icelandic forensic anthropologist

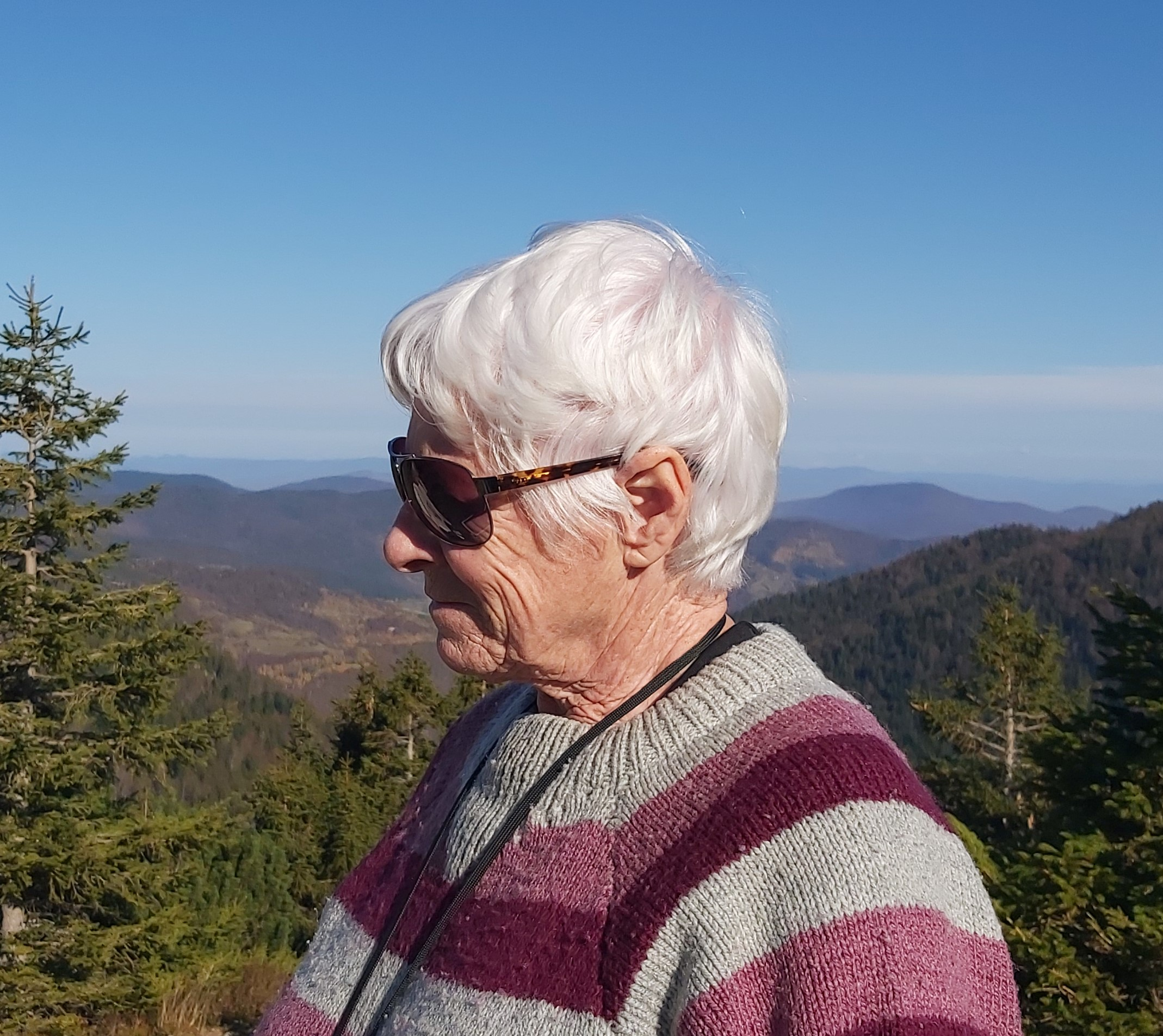
- Born: Ewa Nowak; 18 November 1946 (age 79); Wrocław, Poland
- Citizenship: Iceland
- Occupation: forensic anthropologist
- Known for: responsible for the excavation and identification of over 2,000 victims in BiH
- Spouse: Ireneusz Klonowski

Ewa Klonowski (born 18 November 1946) is a Polish-Icelandic forensic anthropologist. She took political refuge in Iceland in 1981, following the declaration of martial law in the People's Republic of Poland. She has been living in Reykjavík, Iceland since 1982. In 1996, she began working on individual and mass graves exhumation in Bosnia and Herzegovina. Since then, she has been responsible for the excavation and identification of over 2,000 victims, and in 2005 she was nominated to the list of the 1,000 Women for the Nobel Peace Prize. She first worked for Physicians for Human Rights, and began working with the International Commission on Missing Persons in 2001.

== Biography ==
Ewa Elvira Klonowski was born 18 November 1946 in Wrocław, Poland. She has completed courses at the University of Bretagne Occidentale, Brest, France, and the Smithsonian Institution, Washington, D.C. She is a member of the American Academy of Forensic Sciences. In 1981, she became head of the laboratory at the Department of Pathology (Forensic Medicine Division), University of Iceland, Reykjavík.

In 1996, she began working for the International Criminal Tribunal for the former Yugoslavia (ICTY) and The Hague in 1996 on individual and mass graves exhumation in Bosnia and Herzegovina. Since then, she has worked with the Bosniak Commission on Missing Persons, Physicians for Human Rights, as director of the Monitoring Exhumations Project of International Forensic Program, and as a member of Forensic Experts Team of the State Commission for Tracing the Missing Persons, Bosnia-Herzegovina. In 2002, she was the only woman working for the International Commission on Missing Persons (ICMP), established by the Bosnian state in 1996. In 2007, she was working as a Senior Forensic Anthropologist for the International Commission on Missing Persons.

== Work in Bosnia and Herzegovina ==
In 1996, Klonowski left her position as a specialist in paternity inquiries to work excavating mass graves throughout Bosnia. She returned by herself in again 1998, volunteering to work directly for Bosnian Muslims who, she says, "have the least money, and the most dead." The task she and her team face is far from simple, working in bombed-out clothing factories and other makeshift morgues. Of her work, she says, "I love bones; bones speak to me. I can look at some bones and I know what illnesses the person had, how he walked, how he liked to sit. I can determine nationality by bones. A Muslim's femur is bent into a slight arc, because Muslims squat. Japanese have the same feature because they often kneel." Since beginning her work in Bosnia, Klonowski has played a critical role in helping many grieving families identify their missing loved ones.

=== Motivation ===
Klonowski explained to BBC that her interest in identifying the dead goes back to the exhumation of her grandfather from the Katyn Forest massacre in Poland, 1940. He was in the Polish Army reserve in 1939 and was sent to the east, where he was captured and later shot by the Russians. He was uncovered in the first exhumation. That event, she said, was what gave her the belief that relatives should have remains over which to mourn. "It is absolutely important and the same all over the world. When someone you love dies, you bury them or perhaps scatter the ashes (...) Our human reaction is to have a place to go and sit or pray or put a candle or a flower. It is exactly the same whatever religion." When the Bosnian war broke out in 1992, she was "...horrified. It was part of Europe. You saw the horse carts, the people on tractors, the burned houses. I felt I was totally useless as a human being. So when the war ended and there was talk of exhumation, this was something I could do."

=== Excavation ===
Klonowski's project, to attempt to exhume and identify all of the victims of the Bosnian war "was not an easy one to start nor has it been straightforward to carry out." The complexity of the job goes far beyond what the simplicity of the phrase "DNA" might suggest.

To begin with, she must contend with the complex physical history of the graves themselves. "There are primary, secondary and even tertiary graves," she says. Once those carrying out the massacre realized that the outside world knew what was happening, they began moving bodies to more and more remote sites. Klonowski explains, "They brought in back-hoes and diggers to do the job and the decomposing bodies often broke up. Sometimes we get different parts of a body from different graves. Once I predicted that two pieces of bone would fit together. They did. People applauded." In other cases, identification isn't simply possible. In one case, the remains of a girl's relative were found - remains which could have been any of her five brothers or her father. Klonowski related that, "I asked if she wanted them buried. She said she would wait for completion."

Often, due to financial restrictions, DNA testing is not an option, or is only able to go so far. Klonowski says, "...this means that we often have to use other means of making a final confirmation, such as bone structure, previous fractures and teeth. That is where I come in. Sometimes we get a DNA match to any of perhaps several brothers and we cannot identify an individual."

The graves come in many shapes and sizes. Of the two thousand bodies which Dr. Konowski has exhumed, she has "fished them out of wells, hauled them out of caves, dug them out of rubbish tips or from under piles of pig bones” In his book Like Eating A Stone, Wojciech Tochman described one of Dr. Klonowski's excavations. Travelling to the site, the exhumation convoy is protected by soldiers from the international forces (SFOR). First, sappers and a speleologist enter the site - often a cave or open pit - in order to reconnoitre and to check for mines. When they are late, it is not unusual for Klonowski to climb down alone. However, in the case which Tochman describes, “A speleologist went down on a rope and came back up. He said the pit was twenty metres deep, a beautiful chimney-shaped cave; it had honey-beige walls and was full of stalagmites. At the bottom there were some clothes, blankets and bones. He brought up a single skull as proof they were human. (…) Rope ladders were let down, replaced two days later by metal ones - better, because they’re stiff. " The bodies were lifted out of the pit using a rope system, and their sexes were identified before they were packed into plastic bags. At this exhumation, nine bodies were recovered on the first day, and sixteen on the second. Two of the bodies, both female, were identified on site by surviving former prisoners.

Dr Klonowski expects that completion of the excavation and identification process, if even possible, will take another 10 years, and she "intends to be there to see it through".

=== Conflict ===
Eva (Ewa) Klonowski first worked for the US-based Physicians for Human Rights, a contractor for the Yugoslav war crimes tribunal. However, these organizations were only interested in gathering evidence about how people died and who killed them. Klonowski admits frustration with that approach, since it excludes identification from the process. From the start, her determination has clashed with lack of funding, indifferent governments, and ulterior political motives. In 2001, this led her to start working with the International Commission on Missing Persons, which aims identify the victims.

Klonowski has also been critical of the motives of many of those working on exhumations of the mass graves. The initiative receives significant external funding, and when asked, Klonowski said, "God forbid [that the excavations be completed]. It'd be the end of the high incomes, careers and trips to international conferences. The digging has to be done very gradually. It has got to last for years, until retirement. What about the mothers and widows? Who cares? Who's bothered about them? Nobody cares that I care. It grieves me, even though it’s not my country and they're not my people."

=== Impact ===
During her time in Bosnia, Klonowski has identified more than two thousand family members, and has seen first hand the effect which having even part of a body identified as a loved one has on relatives of the victims . A woman named Mersada told the author of Like Eating A Stone that, “Everyone in Bosnia knows Dr. Ewa. She digs up bones here and identifies people. She has found my son for me and has promised to find the other” In Like Eating A Stone, Klonowski recounted the reactions of some family members which particularly stood out in her memory:

"In one factory where we were examining bones, I heard a woman sobbing near a body bag. She was clutching her hands to her chest. Her sobbing and choking became uncontrollable and she was collapsing, so we called an ambulance. I noticed she was holding part of a shoe with thread hanging from it. She had recognized it as the shoe of her son which she had mended. The ambulance crew wanted to take it off her but I told them they would have to cut her hands off first.

Another woman once sat quietly patting some bones. A tear slowly fell from her right eye. Her brother said it was time to go and she replied: 'Let me touch him just once more.' I showed a skull to one woman who recognized the teeth of the dead husband. Her daughters were with her and crying. One of them asked me to take the skull back and close the body bag but the woman reached back in, took out some bones and started to kiss them."

Dr. Klonowski's work is particularly valuable for the attention she pays to identifying the victims and reassembling remains. She is unique in this respect - Tochman writes, "In the places where Ewa doesn't go, no-one is particularly concerned whether a skull fits a spine. If five bodies are dug up, at most they have to be divided into five bags and buried in five coffins. If they were to assemble all the bones they dig up as painstakingly as Ewa does, there would be enough work for several anthropologists for a hundred years."

Additionally, the results of her work have immense promise for future identification of the victims of other mass disasters. Authorities in Thailand, for example, are trying to learn from her experience in the aftermath of the 2004 Indian Ocean Tsunami.

== Honors ==
In 2002, Klonowski was awarded the Officer’s Cross of the Order of Merit of the Republic of Poland by President Aleksander Kwaśniewski

In 2005, her name was added to the list on a joint application called 1,000 Women for the Nobel Peace Prize.

She has also received honorary citizenship from the authorities of the Federation of Bosnia and Herzegovina.

In 2023, she received the Knight's Cross of the Order of the Falcon.

== Bibliography ==
Klonowski has published a textbook and over 20 academic and popular articles including:

- Eva Elvira Klonowski. (2012). Anthropological Examination of Skeletal Remains from Bobovac. Completing and Refitting Skeletal Remains: A report. Glasnik Zemaljskog muzeja Bosne i Hercegovine u Sarajevu: Arheologija, 53: 293-315
- Cholewa-Domanagić, Aleksandra; Klonowski, Ewa Elwira. (2010). Walczę z żywymi o prawa martwych (I Fight with the Living for the Rights of the Dead), Znak, 662-663: 106-117
- Klonowski, EE; Soltyszewski, Ireneusz. (2009). Process of Exhumation and Identification of Victims in the 1992-1995 War in the Territory of Bosnia and Herzegovina. Bosnian Journal of Basic Medical Sciences, 6(1):62-7.
- Eva-Elvira Klonowski. (2007). Forensic Anthropology in Bosnia and Herzegovina: Theory and Practice Amidst Politics and Egos. In Ferllini, Roxana (Eds.), Forensic Archaeology and Human Rights Violations (chapter 7). Springfield, Ill. : Charles C. Thomas.
- Eva-Elvira Klonowski. (2007). Exhumations in Bosnia and Herzegovina: Caves as Mass Graves, from Recovery to Identification. In Ferllini, Roxana & Brickley, Megan (Eds.), Forensic Anthropology: Case Studies From Europe (chapter 12). Springfield, Ill. : Charles C. Thomas.
- Sarajlić N 1, Cihlarz Z, Klonowski EE, Selak I.(2006). Stature Estimation for Bosnian Male Population. Bosnian Journal of Basic Medical Sciences, 6(1):62-7.
- Sarajlić, Nermin; Cihlarz, Zdenko; Klonowski, Eva-Elvira; Selak, Ivan; Brkić, Hrvoje; Topić, Berislav.(2006). Two-criteria Dental Aging Method Applied to a Bosnian Population: comparison of formulae for each tooth group versus one formula for all teeth. Bosnian Journal of Basic Medical Sciences, 6(3):78-83.

Her most-referenced paper is Stature Estimation for Bosnian Male Population, which developed new formulae to estimate the stature of Bosnian men by the length of the femur, tibia, and fibula. The resulting formula is more accurate to the current population of Bosnia and Herzegovina than was the existing standard formula. Published in 2006, the paper has since been referenced by numerous other researchers studying the prediction of stature based on ratio to other bones, in locations such as North India, Croatia, Malaysia, Japan, and Korea.
