= Klonowskie Range =

Mountain range in Poland

Coordinates: 50°57′18″N 20°45′01″E

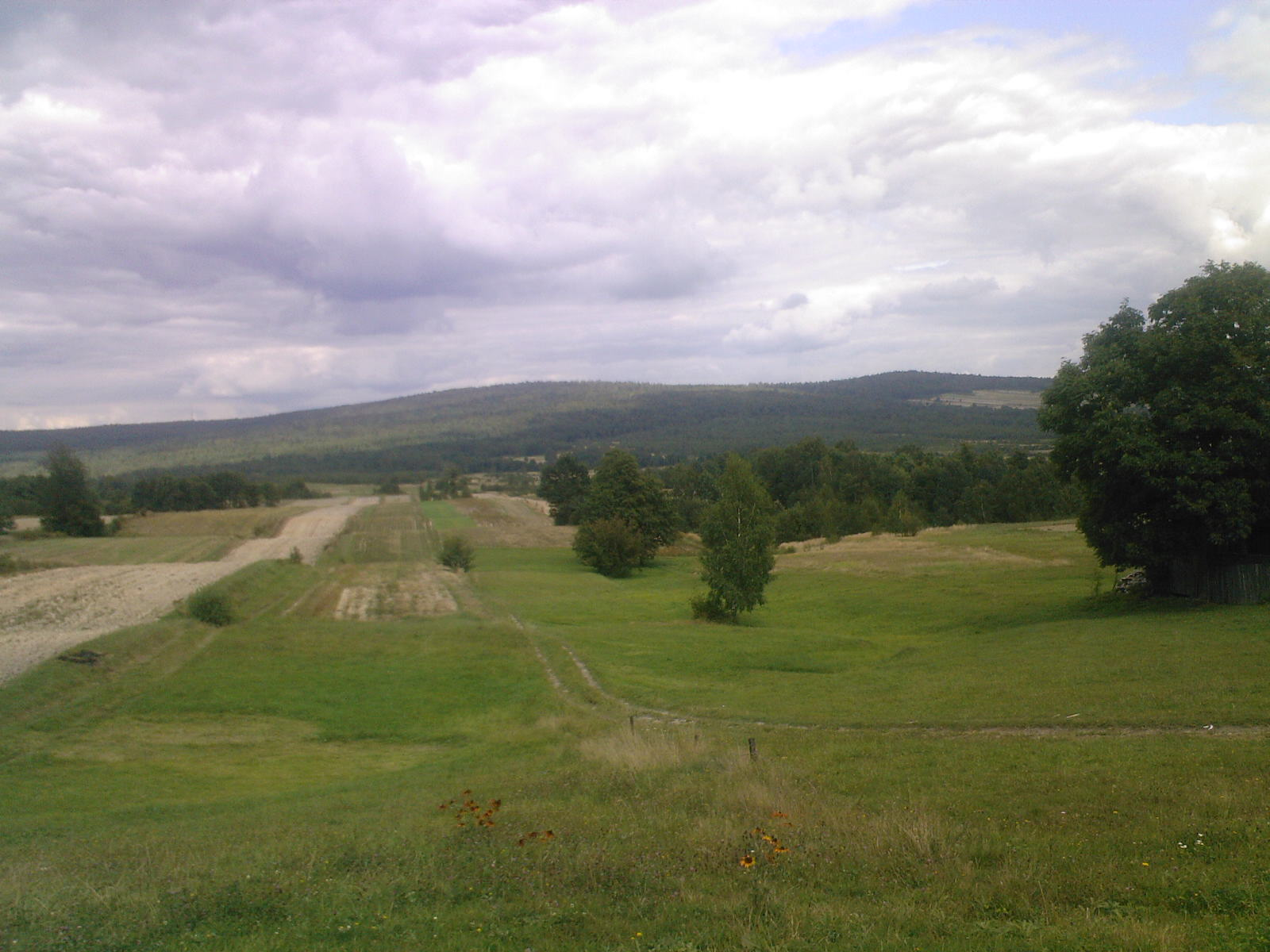
Mount Barcza of the Klonowskie Range at the horizon

The Klonowskie Range (Polish: Pasmo Klonowskie) is a range in Poland stretching from the valley Zagnańska Bobrza in the west, to the east around Bodzentyn within the Świętokrzyskie Mountains. It is constructed mainly of Devonian sandstone and quartzite and is almost entirely covered with fir and beech forest.

== The main peaks ==
- Barcza - 465 m above sea-level
- Czosnek - 42 m
- Bukowa Góra - 484 m
- Psarska Gora - 415 m
- Miejska Góra - 426 m
- Góra Chełm - 399 m
