= Erich Klossowski =

German-Polish-French painter and art historian

Erich Klossowski or Kłossowski (19 December 1875 – 23 January 1949) was a German and Polish-French art historian and a painter, now primarily known as the father of the writer-philosopher Pierre Klossowski and the artist Balthus.

== Biography ==
Klossowski was born in Ragnit, Prussia.

He came from a family which belonged to Polish nobility (drobna szlachta), bearing the Rola coat-of-arms and living in the Prussian part of today's Poland. His son Balthus added "de Rola" to his family name.

Erich Klossowski wrote (in German) one of the early monographs on Honoré Daumier, first published in Munich in 1908 and again in 1914. He married the artist Baladine Klossowska, whom Rainer Maria Rilke called "Merline." Later, the couple moved to Paris.

He died in Sanary-sur-Mer on 23 January 1949.

== Biography ==
Erich Klossowski comes from an old Polish noble family of the Rola coat of arms, the son of Leonard Klossowski, lawyer, notary and judge in Ragnit (then in Prussia) and Lisbeth Doeurk de Fréval.

He married Elisabeth Spiro dite Baladine Klossowska(1886–1969), sister of painter Eugene Spiro, who was herself an artist, a pupil of Pierre Bonnard and muse of Rainer Maria Rilke, who nicknamed her Merline. The couple divorced in 1917.

He was the father of Pierre Klossowski and Balthus. He was close to his compatriot Wilhelm Uhde, whom he welcomed on his arrival in Paris.

== Works ==
- La collection Cheramy; catalogue raisonné précédé d'études sur les maîtres principaux de la collection, par J. Meier-Graefe et E. Klossowski; illustré de 127 héliotypies et de 2 héliogravures hors texte. Munich, R. Piper et Cie, 1908 (Contents Les peintres anglais et Constable, par J. Meier-Graefe.—Eugène Delacroix, par E. Klossowski.—La collection Cheramy, par J. Meier-Graefe.—Catalogue des tableaux anciens.—Catalogue des tableaux de l'école anglaise.—Catalogue des tableaux de l'école française)

== Bibliography ==
- Honoré Daumier, Erich Klossowski, Munich: R. Piper, 1923
