= Venthône =

- Former municipality
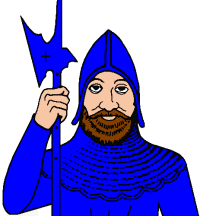
- Flag Coat of arms
- Location of Venthône
- Location within Switzerland Location within Canton of Valais
- Coordinates: 46°18′N 7°32′E
- Country: Switzerland
- Canton: Valais
- District: Sierre

Government
  - Mayor: Gérard Clivaz

Area
  - Total: 2.5 km^{2} (0.97 sq mi)
- Elevation: 799 m (2,621 ft)

Population (December 2019)
  - Total: 1,297
  - Density: 520/km^{2} (1,300/sq mi)
- Time zone: UTC+01:00 (CET)
  - Summer (DST): UTC+02:00 (CEST)
- Postal code: 3973
- SFOS number: 6249
- ISO 3166 code: CH-VS
- Surrounded by: Miège, Mollens, Randogne, Sierre, Veyras
- Website: www.venthone.ch

Venthône (German pronunciation: [vɑ̃ton]) is a former municipality in the district of Sierre in the canton of Valais in Switzerland. On 1 January 2021 the former municipalities of Miège, Venthône and Veyras merged to form the new municipality of Noble-Contrée.

== Geography ==
Aerial view (1949)

Venthône had an area, as of 2009, of 2.5 square kilometers (0.97 mi^{2}). Of this area, 1.12 km^{2} (0.43 mi^{2}) or 44.3% is used for agricultural purposes, while 0.63 km^{2} (0.24 mi^{2}) or 24.9% is forested. Of the rest of the land, 0.79 km^{2} (0.31 mi^{2}) or 31.2% is settled (buildings or roads).

Of the built up area, housing and buildings made up 16.6% and transportation infrastructure made up 12.3%. Power and water infrastructure as well as other special developed areas made up 1.6% of the area. Out of the forested land, 17.8% of the total land area is heavily forested and 7.1% is covered with orchards or small clusters of trees. Of the agricultural land, 0.4% is used for growing crops and 7.9% is pastures, while 36.0% is used for orchards or vine crops.

== Coat of arms ==
The blazon of the municipal coat of arms is Argent, a Semi Warrior issuant armoured and helmeted Azure holding a halbard of the same.

== Demographics ==
Venthône had a population (as of 2019) of 1,297. As of 2008, 13.3% of the population were resident foreign nationals. Over the last 10 years (2000–2010 ), the population has changed at a rate of 18.2% due to migration and at a rate of -0.7% due to births and deaths.

Most of the population (as of 2000) speaks French (820 or 87.7%) as their first language, German is the second most common (87 or 9.3%) and Italian is the third (8 or 0.9%).

As of 2008, the population was 50.3% male and 49.7% female. The population was made up of 506 Swiss men (43.8% of the population) and 75 (6.5%) non-Swiss men. There were 491 Swiss women (42.5%) and 82 (7.1%) non-Swiss women. Of the population in the municipality, 344 or about 36.8% were born in Venthône and lived there in 2000. There were 324 or 34.7% who were born in the same canton, while 140 or 15.0% were born somewhere else in Switzerland, and 107 or 11.4% were born outside of Switzerland.

As of 2000, children and teenagers (0–19 years old) make up 24% of the population, while adults (20–64 years old) make up 59.6% and seniors (over 64 years old) make up 16.5%.

As of 2000, there were 375 people who were single and never married in the municipality. There were 466 married individuals, 51 widows or widowers and 43 individuals who were divorced.

As of 2000, there were 376 private households in the municipality, and an average of 2.4 persons per household. There were 121 households that consisted of only one person and 27 households with five or more people. In 2000, a total of 345 apartments (67.3% of the total) were permanently occupied, while 143 apartments (27.9%) were seasonally occupied, and 25 apartments (4.9%) were empty. As of 2009, the construction rate of new housing units was 3.5 new units per 1000 residents. The vacancy rate for the municipality, in 2010, was 1.36%.

The historical population is given in the following chart:

== Heritage sites of national significance ==
The Tower in Venthône listed as Swiss heritage site of national significance. The entire village of Venthône is part of the Inventory of Swiss Heritage Sites.

== Politics ==
In the 2007 federal election the most popular party was the CVP which received 35.86% of the vote. The next three most popular parties were the FDP (18.51%), the SP (14.49%) and the SVP (13.98%). In the federal election, a total of 538 votes were cast, and the voter turnout was 66.6%.

In the 2009 Conseil d'État/Staatsrat election a total of 494 votes were cast, of which 38 or about 7.7% were invalid. The voter participation was 60.9%, which is much more than the cantonal average of 54.67%. In the 2007 Swiss Council of States election a total of 534 votes were cast, of which 39 or about 7.3% were invalid. The voter participation was 66.8%, which is much more than the cantonal average of 59.88%.

== Economy ==
As of 2010, Venthône had an unemployment rate of 2.5%. As of 2008, there were 46 people employed in the primary economic sector and about 20 businesses involved in this sector. 35 people were employed in the secondary sector and there were 11 businesses in this sector. 92 people were employed in the tertiary sector, with 21 businesses in this sector. There were 448 residents of the municipality who were employed in some capacity, of which females made up 42.4% of the workforce.

In 2008 the total number of full-time equivalent jobs was 130. The number of jobs in the primary sector was 24, all of which were in agriculture. The number of jobs in the secondary sector was 30 of which 15 or (50.0%) were in manufacturing and 15 (50.0%) were in construction. The number of jobs in the tertiary sector was 76. In the tertiary sector; 11 or 14.5% were in wholesale or retail sales or the repair of motor vehicles, 3 or 3.9% were in the movement and storage of goods, 42 or 55.3% were in a hotel or restaurant, 8 or 10.5% were technical professionals or scientists, 4 or 5.3% were in education.

In 2000, there were 26 workers who commuted into the municipality and 321 workers who commuted away. The municipality is a net exporter of workers, with about 12.3 workers leaving the municipality for every one entering. Of the working population, 3.6% used public transportation to get to work, and 77.5% used a private car.

== Religion ==
From the 2000 census, 748 or 80.0% were Roman Catholic, while 74 or 7.9% belonged to the Swiss Reformed Church. Of the rest of the population, there were 8 members of an Orthodox church (or about 0.86% of the population), and there were 39 individuals (or about 4.17% of the population) who belonged to another Christian church. There were 3 (or about 0.32% of the population) who were Islamic. 46 (or about 4.92% of the population) belonged to no church, are agnostic or atheist, and 36 individuals (or about 3.85% of the population) did not answer the question.

== Education ==
In Venthône about 309 or (33.0%) of the population have completed non-mandatory upper secondary education, and 203 or (21.7%) have completed additional higher education (either university or a Fachhochschule). Of the 203 who completed tertiary schooling, 63.5% were Swiss men, 26.6% were Swiss women, 6.4% were non-Swiss men and 3.4% were non-Swiss women.

As of 2000, there were 5 students in Venthône who came from another municipality, while 89 residents attended schools outside the municipality.
