= Château de Muzot =

13th century manor house in Switzerland

Coordinates: 46.3064°N 7.5401°E

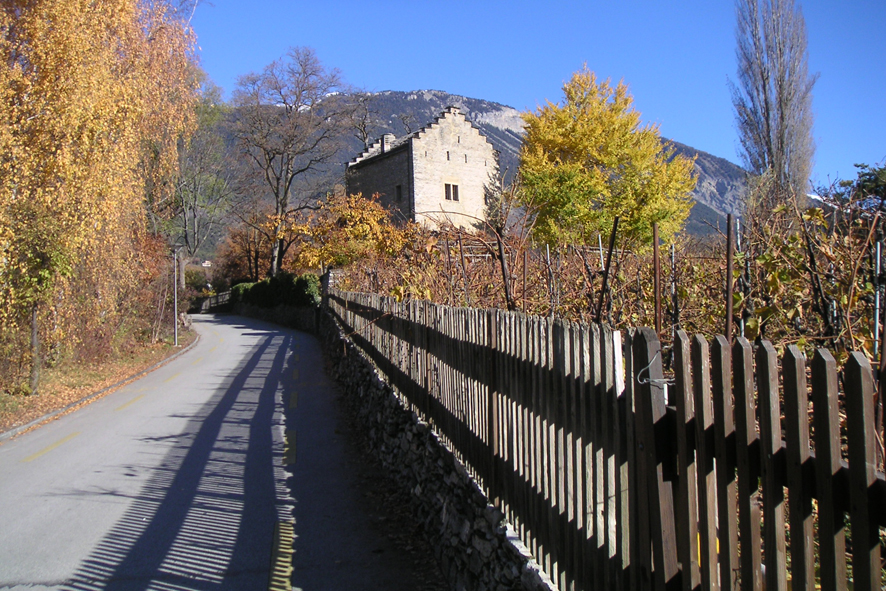
Château de Muzot in Veyras, Switzerland, was where Rilke completed writing the Duino Elegies in "a savage creative storm" in February 1922.

Château de Muzot (also known as Maison Muzot or Muzot Castle) is a 13th-century fortified manor house located near Veyras in Switzerland's Rhone Valley.

In 1921, it was purchased by Swiss merchant and arts patron Werner Reinhart who then invited Bohemian-Austrian poet Rainer Maria Rilke (1875–1926) to live there rent-free. It was at Muzot, during a few weeks in February 1922, that Rilke after a long silence caused by severe depression finally completed the Duino Elegies and wrote the entire Sonnets to Orpheus (both published in 1923).

== Rilke: Duino Elegies and Sonnets to Orpheus ==
From 1921 to 1926, Muzot was the home of Bohemian-Austrian poet Rainer Maria Rilke (1875–1926). Here, after ten years of work and delays, in February 1922 Rilke finished work on the Duino Elegies, a collection of ten long poems concerning deeply mystical and philosophical themes. Muzot appears in a reference within the poem cycle Sonnets from China (1936) by British poet W.H. Auden (1907–1973) who was inspired by Rilke.

Tonight in China let me think of one

Who through ten years of silence worked and waited,
Until in Muzot all his powers spoke,
And everything was given once for all.

And with the gratitude of the Completed
He went out in the winter night to stroke
That little tower like a great old animal

The reference here to stroking "that little tower" is Muzot, and is derived from a series of letters written while Rilke was completing the Elegies including a letter he wrote to his current lover Baladine Klossowska, and one to his former lover, Lou Andreas-Salomé. In the letter to Andreas-Salomé, he writes "I went out and stroked the little Muzot, which protected it and me and finally granted it, like a large old animal.".
