= The Baphomet =

1965 novel by Pierre Klossowski

- 1988 edition
- Author: Pierre Klossowski
- Subject: Fiction, Erotic literature
- Publisher: Marsilio
- Publication date: 1965
- Pages: 170
- ISBN: 9781568860565

The Baphomet is a transgressive piece of experimental fiction authored by Pierre Klossowski. Klossowski wrote his original French novel in 1965, but it was not available in English until 1988, when a translation by Sophie Hawke and Stephen Sartorelli was published by Eridanos Press.

The Baphomet was awarded the 1965 Prix des Critiques. In protest of the award, Roger Caillois resigned from the jury, citing his disapproval of the work's organization, style, and grammar.

== Narrative ==
Given that its structure is nonlinear, the following attempts to provide some coherence to the narrative of this book.

Baphomet itself was a fabled idol that the medieval Knights Templar supposedly worshipped, until the violent suppression of their order, for heresy and sodomy in 1307. In this narrative, the ghosts of Templar monks reassemble each year to commemorate their immolation, and engage in spirit possession of unwary animals and small children. In this case, the body of a recently dead page gives cause for interest, although the Templar Grand Master, Friedrich Nietzsche, and Klossowski himself also assume animal forms during the dialogue and vignettes that follow, and provide commentary on eros, death, transgression and rejection of conventional morality. It is never certain whether Baphomet is an actual entity, or whether this is a hallucinogenic spectacle produced by the dying consciousness of the monks themselves shortly before onset of death.

== Editions ==
- Le Baphomet: France Mercure, Paris, 1965
- The Baphomet: translation by Sophie Hawke and Stephen Sartorelli; Eridanos Press, Hygiene, Colorado, 1988 ISBN 0941419-16-9
- The Baphomet: translation by Sophie Hawke and Stephen Sartorelli; Marsilio Press, New York, 1992 ISBN 0-941419-73-8
