= Pierre Klossowski =

French writer, translator and artist (1905–2001)

- Born: 9 August 1905; Paris, France
- Died: 12 August 2001 (aged 96); Paris, France
- Occupations: Writer, translator, artist
- Known for: French Nietzscheanism
- Children: 1
- Relatives: Balthasar Klossowski (brother)

Pierre Klossowski (/kləˈsaʊski/; French: [klɔsɔfski]; 9 August 1905 – 12 August 2001) was a French writer, translator and artist. He was the eldest son of the artists Erich Klossowski and Baladine Klossowska, and his younger brother was the painter Balthus (Balthasar Klossowski).

== Life ==
Born in Paris, Pierre Klossowski was the older brother of the artist Balthazar Klossowski, better known as Balthus. Their parents were the art historian Erich Klossowski and the painter Baladine Klossowska. His German-educated father came from a family supposedly belonging to the former Polish petty nobility (drobna szlachta) and bearing the Rola coat of arms. His mother, Baladine Klossowska, was born as Elisabeth Dorothea Spiro in Breslau, Prussia (now Wrocław, Poland). When he was 18, Pierre was André Gide's secretary and worked on the drafts of Les faux-monnayeurs for him. Klossowski was responsible for a new publication of The 120 Days of Sodom and Other Writings by the Marquis de Sade in 1964.

== Writing ==
Klossowski wrote full-length volumes on de Sade and Friedrich Nietzsche, a number of essays on literary and philosophical figures, and five novels. His 1953 short novel Roberte Ce Soir (Roberte in the Evening) provoked controversy due to its graphic depiction of sexuality. He translated several important texts (by Virgil, Ludwig Wittgenstein, Martin Heidegger, Friedrich Hölderlin, Franz Kafka, Nietzsche, and Walter Benjamin) into French, worked on films and was also an artist, illustrating many of the scenes from his novels. Klossowski participated in most issues of Georges Bataille's review Acéphale in the late 1930s.

His 1969 book-length philosophical study Nietzsche et le cercle vicieux (Nietzsche and the Vicious Circle) greatly influenced French philosophers such as Michel Foucault, Gilles Deleuze and Jean-François Lyotard. "Whereas Saussure's semiotic was an Apollonian semiotic of language interpreted as a formal system of difference, Klossowski's semiotic is a Dionysian one in which impulses break through conventional forms of thought, generate phantasms and simulacra, reinscribe received ideas, and produce new modes of seeing and living."

== Film ==
Klossowski also appeared in Robert Bresson's Au hasard Balthazar as the avaricious miller who desires Marie, a character played by Anne Wiazemsky.

He was involved in:

- Raoul Ruiz's La vocation suspendue, 1977, 90';
- Raoul Ruiz's L'hypothèse du tableau volé, 1979, 66';
- Pierre Zucca's Roberte, 1979, 100';
- Alain Fleischer's Pierre Klossowski ou l'éternel détour, 1996, 106'.

His text on de Sade is mentioned in the bibliography at the beginning of Pier Paolo Pasolini's Salò, or the 120 Days of Sodom, and quoted several times through the film.

== Drawings ==
An exhibition of Klossowski's drawings and life size sculptures made after them with sculptor Jean-Paul Réti ran from 20 September to 19 October 2006, at the Whitechapel Art Gallery, the Ludwig Museum in Cologne and the Musée National d'Art Moderne in Paris along with a film retrospective.

== Bibliography ==
Year	Original French	English Translation	
1947	Sade mon prochain preceded by Le philosophe scélérat (Paris: Seuil, 1947) Contents: Avertissement; Le philosophe scélérat. Sade mon prochain: Sade et la Révolution; Esquisse du système de Sade; Sous le masque de l'athéisme; Appendices.	Sade My Neighbor trans. by Alphonso Lingis (Northwestern University Press, 1991) Contents: Translator's Introduction; Preface; The Philosopher Villain; Sade My Neighbor: Sade and the revolution; Outline of Sade's system; Under the Mask of Atheism.	
1950	La Vocation suspendue (Paris: Gallimard, 1950)	The Suspended Vocation trans. by Jeremy M. Davies and Anna Fitzgerald with introduction by Brian Evenson (Small Press, 2020)	
1953	Roberte ce soir (Paris: Minuit, 1953)	Roberte ce soir and The Revocation of the Edict of Nantes trans. by Austryn Wainhouse (Dalkey Archive Press, 2002)	
1956	Le Bain de Diane (Paris: Pauvert, 1956; Gallimard, 1980)	Diana at Her Bath/the Women of Rome trans. by Sophie Hawkes and Stephen Sartarelli (Marsilio Publishers, 1998) ISBN 1-56886-055-2	
1959	La Révocation de l'édit de Nantes (Paris: Minuit, 1959)	Roberte ce soir and The Revocation of the Edict of Nantes trans. by Austryn Wainhouse (Dalkey Archive Press, 2002)	
1960	Le Souffleur ou le théâtre de société (Paris: Jean-Jacques Pauvert, 1960)	-	
1963	Un si funeste désir (Paris: Gallimard, 1963) Contents: Sur quelques thèmes fondamentaux de la Gaya Scienza de Nietzsche; Gide, du Bos et le démon; En marge de la correspondance de Claudel et de Gide; Préface à Un prêtre marié de Barbey d'Aurevilly; La messe de Georges Bataille; Le language, le silence et le communisme; Sur Maurice Blanchot; Nietzsche, le polythéisme et la parodie.	Such a Deathly Desire trans. by Russell Ford (State University of New York Press, 2007)	
1965	Le Baphomet (Paris: Mercure de France, 1965)	The Baphomet trans. by Sophie Hawkes and Stephen Sartarelli (Marsilio Pub, 1992) ISBN 0-941419-73-8	
1965	Les Lois de l'hospitalité (Paris: Gallimard, 1965) (trilogy of the 'Roberte' novels: La Révocation de l'Édit de Nantes (1959), Roberte ce soir (1954), and Le Souffleur (1960))	Roberte ce Soir and The Revocation of the Edict of Nantes trans. by Austryn Wainhouse with introduction by Micheal Perkins (Dalkey Archive Press, 2002)	
1968	Origines Culturelles et mythiques d'un certain comportement des dames romaines (Paris: Fata Morgana, 1968)	Diana at Her Bath/the Women of Rome trans. by Sophie Hawkes and Stephen Sartarelli (Marsilio Publishers, 1998) ISBN 1-56886-055-2	-
1969	Nietzsche et le cercle vicieux (Paris: Mercure de France, 1969) Contents: Introduction; Le combat contre la culture; Les états valétudinaires à l'origine d'une sémiotique pulsionnelle; L'expérience de l'Éternel Retour; Les états valétudinaires à l'origine des quatre critères : décadence, essor, grégarité, cas singulier; Tentative d'une explication scientifique de l'Éternel Retour; Le cercle vicieux en tant que doctrine sélective; La consultation de l'obre paternelle; La plus belle invention du malade; L'euphorie de Turin; Note additionnelle à la sémiotique de Nietzsche.	Nietzsche and the Vicious Circle (London: The Athlone Press, 1997, 2000 ISBN 0-485-12133-6; University of Chicago Press, 1998, ISBN 0-226-44387-6;) Contents: Translator's Preface; Introduction; 1. The Combat against Culture; 2. The Valetudinary States at the Origin of a Semiotic of Impulses; 3. The Experience of the Eternal Return; 4. The Valetudinary States at the Origin of Four Criteria: Decadence, Vigour, Gregariousness, the Singular Case; 5. Attempt at a Scientific Explanation of the Eternal Return; 6. The Vicious Circle as a Selective Doctrine; 7. The Consultation of the Paternal Shadow; 8. The Most Beautiful Invention of the Sick; 9. The Euphoria of Turin; 10. Additional Note on Nietzsche's Semiotic; Notes; Index.	
1970	La Monnaie vivante (Paris: Éric Losfield, 1970)	-	
1984	La Ressemblance (Marseille: André Dimanche, 1984)	-	
1987	Les derniers travaux de Gulliver (Paris: Fata Morgana, 1987)	-	
1988	Le Mage du Nord (Montpellier: Fata Morgana, 1988)	-	
	Posthumous publications		
2001	Écrits d'un monomane: Essais 1933–1939 (Paris: Gallimard, 2001)	-	
2001	Tableaux vivants: Essais critiques 1936–1983 (Paris: Gallimard, 2001). Contents: 1. Essais d'Acéphale: Don Juan selon Kierkegaard; Création du monde; Deux interprétations récentes de Nietzsche; Le monstre. 2. Trois amitiés: Rainer Maria Rilke et les Élégies de Duino; Pierre Jean Jouvre romancier : Catherine Crachat; Lettre sur Walter Benjamin. 3. Les règles de l'art: De Contre-Attaque à Acéphale; Explication continuée; Fragments d'une lettre à Michel Butor. 4. Du tableau vivant, en particulier: Du tableau vivant dans la peinture de Balthus; La 'Judith de Frédéric Tonnerre; On peut toujours dire que le trait...; L'on me demandait naguère pourquoi...; La description, l'argumentation, le récit...; Le geste muet du passage matériel au dessin; Du Simulacre.	-	
2001	L'adolescent immortel (Paris: Gallimard, 2001)	The Immortal Adolescent trans by Catherine Petit & Paul Buck (London: Vauxhall&Company, 2014)	
2003	La Monnaie vivante (Paris: Gallimard, 2003)	Living Currency trans by Daniel W. Smith, Vernon W. Cisney, and Nicolae Morar (London: Bloomsbury Academic, 2017)	

=== Translations ===
- Friedrich Sieburg, Défense du nationalisme allemand, Grasset (1933)
- Walter Benjamin, L'œuvre d'art à l'époque de sa reproduction mécanisée (1936) – in consultation with the author for the first publication of the essay
- Friedrich Sieburg, Robespierre, Flammarion (1936)
- J. G. Hamann, Les Méditations Bibliques, Minuit (1948), critical edition, Éditions Ionas, 2016 – online
- Friedrich Nietzsche, Le Gai Savoir (1956)
- Ludwig Wittgenstein, Tractatus logico-philosophicus suivi de Investigations philosophiques (1961)
- Martin Heidegger, Nietzsche (1971)

== See also ==
- College of Sociology
